= Tampere =

City in Western Finland

Tampere Tammerfors (Swedish)
- City
- Tampereen kaupunki Tammerfors stad City of Tampere
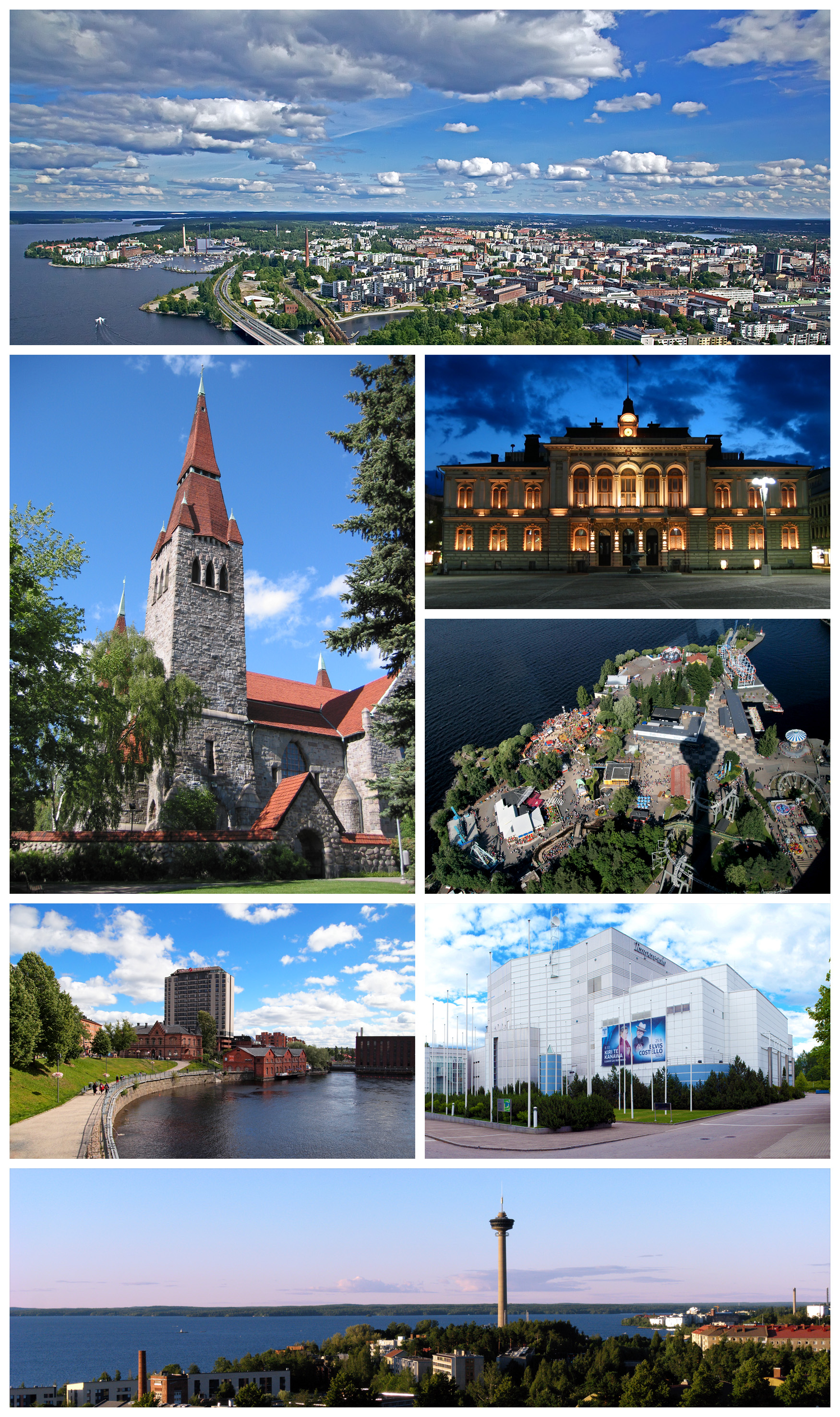
- Clockwise from top: the cityscape (viewed from Näsinneula); Tampere City Hall; Särkänniemi (from Näsinneula); Tampere Hall; the skyline with Näsinneula; Tammerkoski from Hämeensilta Bridge; and the Cathedral.

- Flag Coat of arms
- Nicknames: Manchester of the North, Nashville of the North, Manse (“Manchester” in Finnish), Nääsville (“Nashville” in Finnish), (Note: Pronounced in almost the same way as Nashville) Sauna Capital of the World
- Location of Tampere (in black) in the Pirkanmaa region

- Location of Tampere in Finland
- Interactive map of Tampere
- Coordinates: 61°29′53″N 23°45′36″E
- Country: Finland
- Region: Pirkanmaa
- Sub-region: Tampere
- Metropolitan area: Tampere
- City rights: 1 October 1779

Government
  - Mayor: Ilmari Nurminen (sd.)

Area (2018-01-01)
  - City: 689.59 km^{2} (266.25 sq mi)
  - Land: 524.89 km^{2} (202.66 sq mi)
  - Water: 164.56 km^{2} (63.54 sq mi)
  - Urban: 284.2 km^{2} (109.7 sq mi)
  - Rank: 166th largest in Finland

Population (2025-12-31)
  - City: 263,337
  - Rank: 3rd largest in Finland
  - Density: 501.7/km^{2} (1,299/sq mi)
  - Urban: 369,233
  - Urban density: 1,299.2/km^{2} (3,365/sq mi)
  - Metro: 446,123
- Demonym(s): tamperelainen (Finnish) tammerforsare (Swedish); Tamperean (English)

Population by native language
  - Finnish: 87.5% (official)
  - Swedish: 0.5%
  - Others: 12%

Population by age
  - 0 to 14: 13.3%
  - 15 to 64: 67.5%
  - 65 or older: 19.2%
- Time zone: UTC+02:00 (EET)
  - Summer (DST): UTC+03:00 (EEST)
- Website: www.tampere.fi

Tampere (Note: /ˈtæmpəreɪ/, US also /ˈtæmpərə, ˈtɑːmpəreɪ/) (Note: Finnish: [ˈtɑmpere]; Swedish: Tammerfors, Finland Swedish: [tɑmærˈforsː]) is a city in Finland and the regional capital of Pirkanmaa. It is in the Finnish Lakeland. Tampere's population is about 263,000, while the metropolitan area has a population of about 428,000. It is Finland's 3rd most populous municipality and the second most populous urban area in the country after the Helsinki metropolitan area.

Tampere is the most populous inland city in the Nordic countries and Fennoscandia. The urban area has a population of about 370,000. Tampere is considered the most important urban, economic and cultural centre in the whole of inland Finland.

Tampere and its surroundings are part of the historic province of Satakunta, but the area belonged to the province of Häme (Tavastia) from 1831 to 1997 and it has often been considered part of that province. For example, in Uusi tietosanakirja, published in the 1960s, the Tampere subregion is presented as part of the then province of Tavastia.

Between 1775 and 1870, Tammerkoski rapids formed the border between the former province of Häme and the province of Turku and Pori. The city of Tampere was on the western side of the rapids, but the eastern bank was attached to the city in 1877.

Around the 1950s, Tampere and its surroundings began to establish themselves as a separate province known as Pirkanmaa. Tampere became the centre of Pirkanmaa, and Tammermaa was also used several times in the province's early days, for example in the Suomi-käsikirja published in 1968.

Tampere is wedged between two lakes, Lake Näsijärvi and Lake Pyhäjärvi, with an 18 m (59 ft) difference in water level, and the rapids that connect them, Tammerkoski, have been an important source of power throughout history, most recently for generating electricity. Tampere is known as the "Manchester of the North" because of its past as a centre of Finnish industry, which has given rise to its Finnish nickname "Manse" and terms such as "Manserock". Tampere has also been officially declared the "Sauna Capital of the World" because it has the most public saunas in the world.

Helsinki is about 160 km (100 mi) south of Tampere and can be reached by Pendolino high-speed train in 1 hour 31 minutes and by car in two hours. The distance to Turku, Finland's third most populous urban area, is about the same. The Tampere–Pirkkala Airport is the eighth busiest airport in Finland, with more than 230,000 passengers using it in 2017. Tampere is also an important transit route for three Finnish highways: Highway 3 (E12), Highway 9 (E63) and Highway 12. The Tampere light rail had two lines when it started operating in 2021.

Tampere is often rated as the most popular city in Finland. The development of Tampere and its metropolitan area has continued into the 21st century, largely because Tampere is one of Finland's most attractive cities. In 2023, Tampere won the first prize at the Smart City World Congress in Barcelona, competing in the category of enabling technologies, while also receiving recognition for the use of technological solutions for the benefit of residents and businesses.

== Etymology ==
Although the name Tampere derives from the Tammerkoski rapids (both the city and the rapids are called Tammerfors in Swedish), the origin and meaning of the Tammer- part of the name has been the subject of much debate. Linguist Ánte Aikio accepts the "straightforward" etymology of Rahkonen and Heikkilä in Proto-Samic *Tëmpël(kōškë), *tëmpël meaning "deep, slow part of a stream" and *kōškë "rapids" (related to the Finnish koski), which has become the most accepted explanation in academia, according to the Institute for the Languages of Finland. Other theories are that it comes from the Swedish word damber, meaning milldam or that it comes from the ancient Scandinavian words þambr ("fat-bellied") and þambion ("swollen belly"), possibly referring to the rapids' shape. Another suggestion links the name to the Swedish word Kvatemberdagar, or more colloquially Tamperdagar, which refers to the Ember Days of the Western Christian liturgical calendar. The Finnish word for oak, tammi, has also been suggested, although Tampere is outside the natural range of the European oak.

=== Heraldry ===
Coat of arms of Tampere

(1839–1960)

(1960-)

Tampere's first coat of arms was designed by Arvid von Cederwald in 1838, while the current coat of arms, created in 1960, was designed by Olof Eriksson. Changing the coat of arms was controversial, and even after the change there were occasional calls for the old coat of arms to be restored. The new coat of arms was also described in letters to the editor as Soviet-style because of its colours.

The blazon of the old coat of arms has either not survived or was never made, but the current coat of arms has been described as follows: "In the red field, a corrugated counter-bar, above which is accompanied by a piled hammer, and below a caduceus; all gold". Its colours are the same as in the coat of arms of Pirkanmaa. The hammer, which looks like the first letter of the city's name, T, symbolises Tampere's early industry, the caduceus its commercial activities, and the wavy counter-bar the Tammerkoski rapids that divide Tampere's industrial and commercial areas.

The city received its first seal in 1803, depicting the city's buildings of the time and Tammerkoski.

== History ==
=== Early history ===
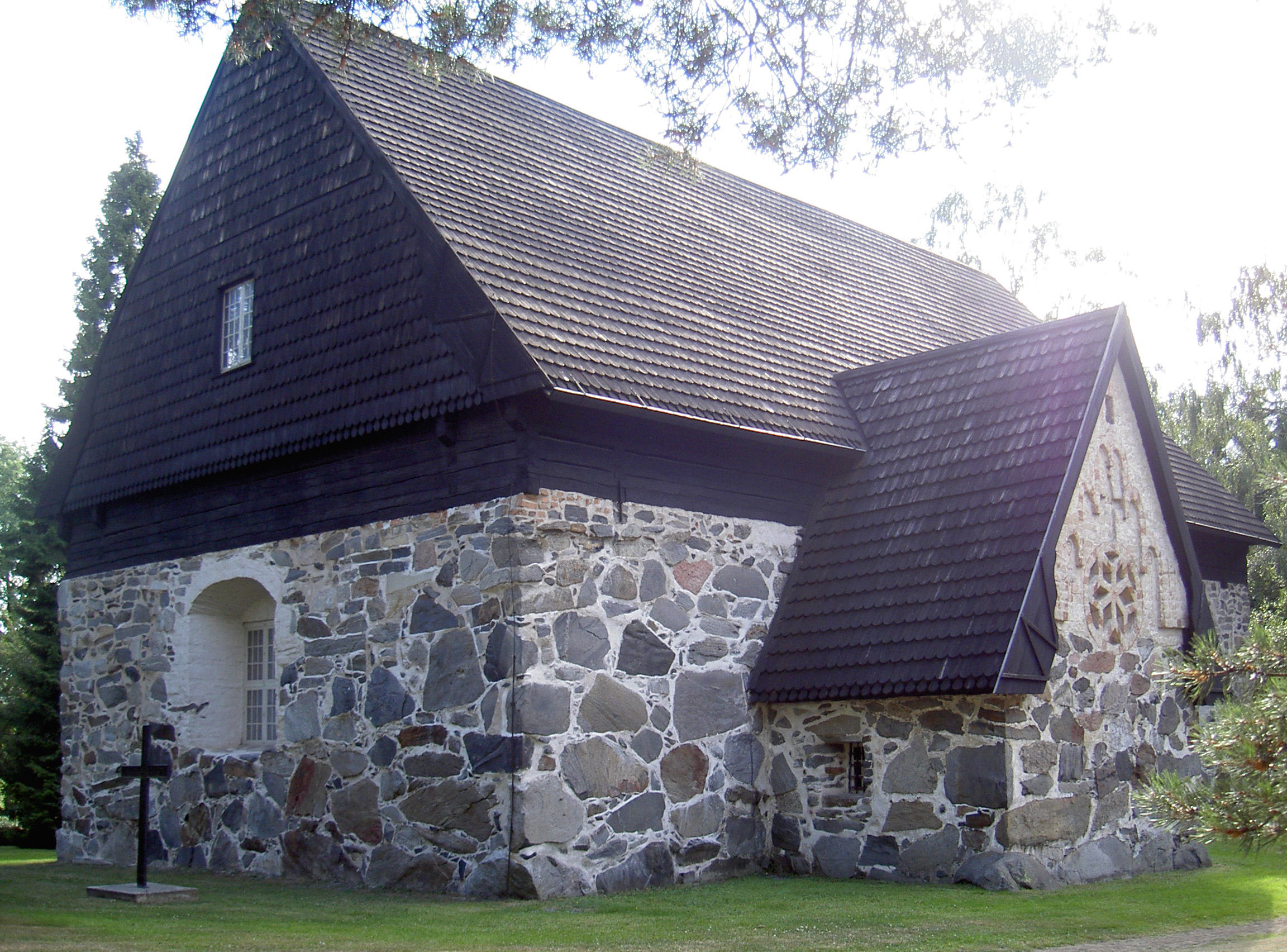
Messukylä Old Church, built between 1510 and 1530

The earliest known permanent settlements around Tammerkoski were established in the 7th century, when settlers from the west of the region began to farm land in Takahuhti, an area largely inhabited by the Tavastian tribes. The population remained small for many centuries. By the 16th century, the villages of Messukylä and Takahuhti had become the area's largest settlements. Other nearby villages were Laiskola, Pyynikkälä and Hatanpää. There had been a marketplace in the Pispala area for centuries, where the bourgeoisie from Turku in particular traded. In 1638, Governor-General Per Brahe the Younger ordered that two markets be held in Tammerkoski every year, the autumn market on St Peter's Day in August and the winter one on Matias's Day in February. In 1708 the market was moved from the outskirts of Tammerkoski to Harju, and in 1758 from there to Pispala. The first industries in the Pirkanmaa region in the 17th century were mainly watermills and sawmills. In the 18th century other industries began to develop, as several small ironworks, the Tammerkoski distillery, and the Otavala spinning school were established.

=== Founding and industrialization ===
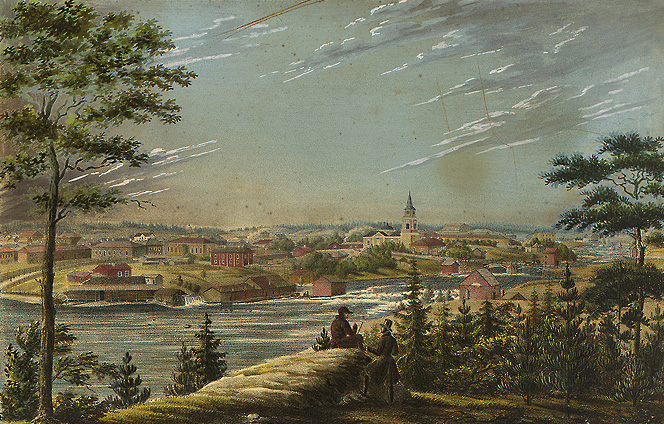
Tampere seen from the Messukylä side of Tammerkoski in the 1837 artwork by Pehr Adolf Kruskopf

Before the founding of the city of Tampere, the neighbouring parish of Pirkkala (from which the current region of Pirkanmaa takes its name) was the most administratively important parish in the area throughout the Middle Ages. This changed in the 18th century when Erik Edner, a Finnish pastor, proposed the establishment of a town on the banks of the Tammerkoski rapids in 1771–1772; it was officially founded as a market town (Note: Known in Sweden as köping and the Finnish word kauppala.) in 1775 by Gustav III of Sweden, and on 1 October 1779, Tampere was granted full town rights. At that time it was rather small, founded on the lands of the Tammerkoski manor, and its inhabitants were mainly farmers. As farming was forbidden within the city limits, the inhabitants began to rely on other means of earning a living, mainly trade and crafts. In 1809, when the Grand Duchy of Finland was formed, Tampere still had less than a thousand inhabitants.

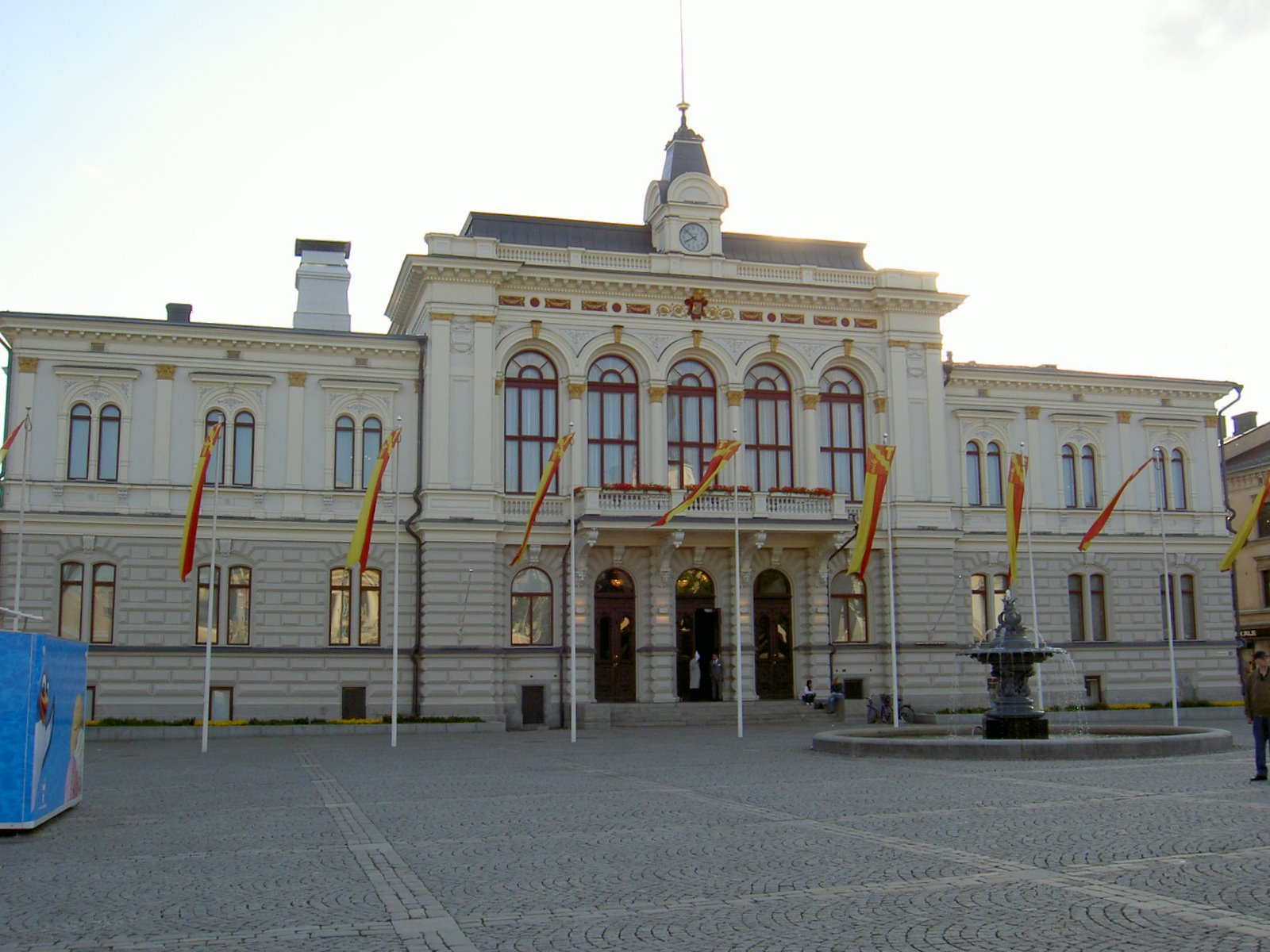
The Renaissance Revival Raatihuone (City Hall), 1890; the Red Declaration was read from its balcony in 1905.

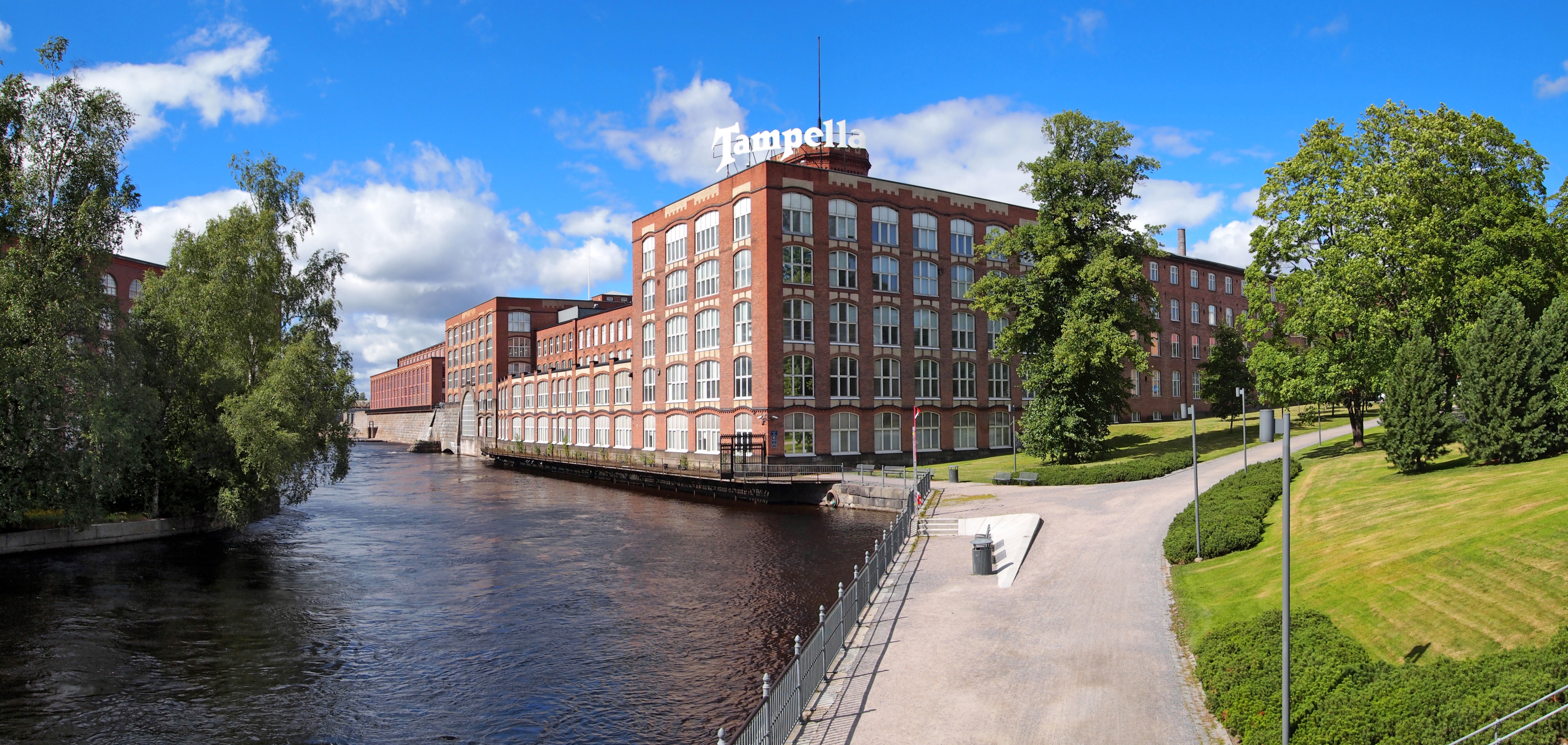
The old Tampella factory in Tampere

In the 19th century, Tampere grew into an important market town and industrial centre; its industrialisation was greatly influenced by the Finlayson textile factory, founded in 1820 by the Scottish industrialist James Finlayson. By 1850, the factory employed around 2000 people, while the city's population had grown to 4000. Other notable industrial establishments that followed Finlayson's success in the 1800s were the Tampella blast furnace, machine factory and flax mill, the Frenckell paper mill and the Tampere broadcloth factory. Tampere's population grew rapidly at the end of the 19th century, from around 7,000 in 1870 to 36,000 in 1900. At the beginning of the 20th century, Tampere was a city of workers and women, with a third of the population being factory workers and more than half women. At the same time, the area of the city increased almost sevenfold and impressive apartment blocks were built in the centre of Tampere between modest wooden houses. The stone houses gave Tampere a modern look. The construction of the sewerage and water supply networks and the introduction of electric lighting were further steps towards modernisation.

The Finlayson weaving shed in central Tampere became the first place in the Nordic countries to be lit by electric light on 15 March 1882.

Tampere was the first Nordic city to introduce electric lighting for general use in 1882. The railway connection to Tampere from the extension of the Helsinki-Hämeenlinna line (now part of the Main Line) via Toijala was opened to the public on 22 June 1876.

The world-famous Nokia Corporation, a multinational telecommunications company, also had its beginnings in the Tammerkoski area; the company's history dates back to 1865, when mining engineer Fredrik Idestam established a pulp mill on the banks of the rapids, and a second pulp mill was opened in 1868 near the neighbouring town of Nokia, where there were better hydroelectric resources.

=== Geopolitical significance ===
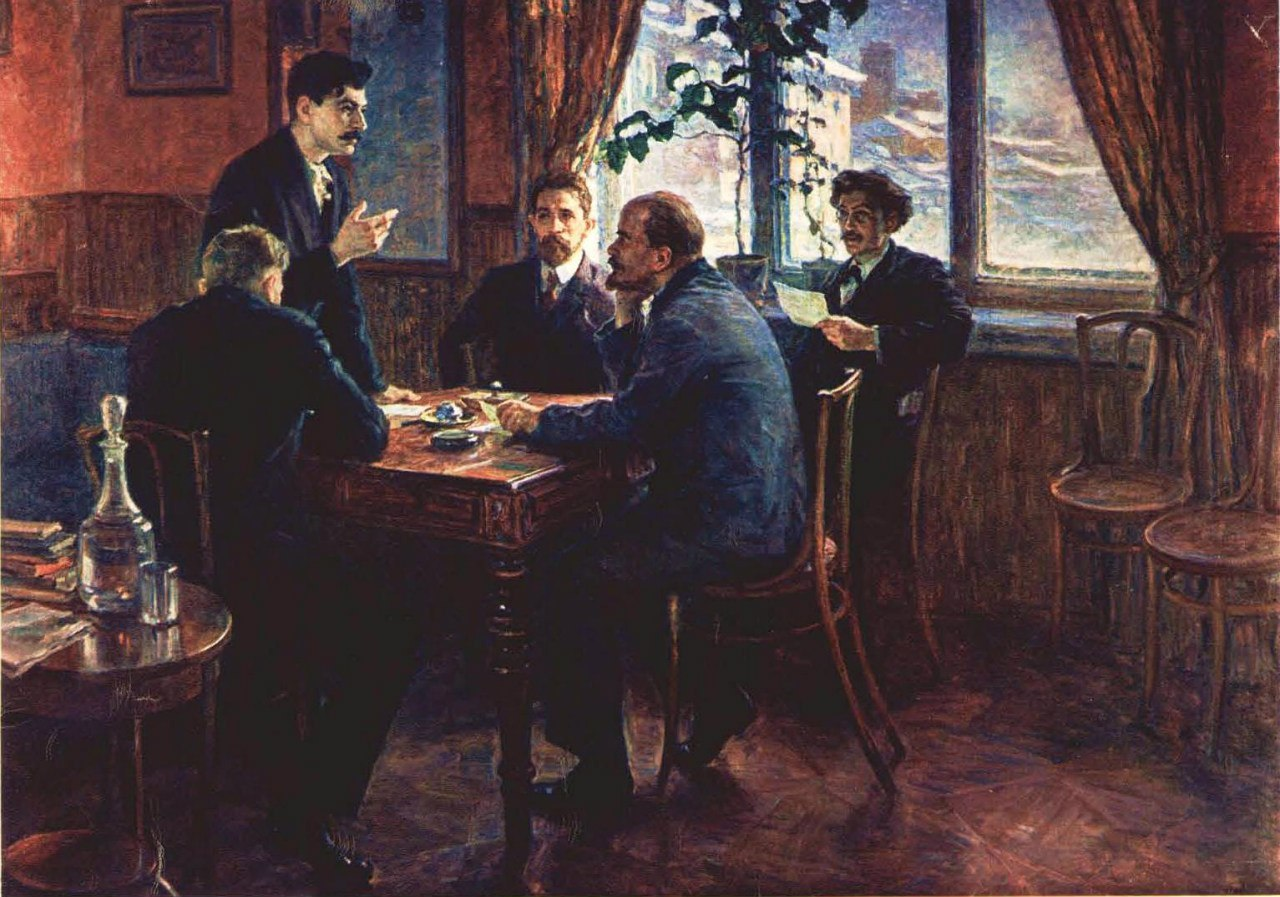
Painting of Stalin and Lenin at the 1905 Tampere Conference

Tampere was the centre of many important political events in the early 20th century, such as the 1905 conference of the Russian Social Democratic Labour Party (RSDLP), led by Vladimir Lenin, held in the Tampere Workers' Hall during their flight from Russia, where it was decided, among other things, to launch an armed insurrection that eventually led to the October 1917 revolution in the Russian Empire. Also, on 1 November 1905, during the General Strike, the famous Red Declaration was proclaimed in Keskustori.

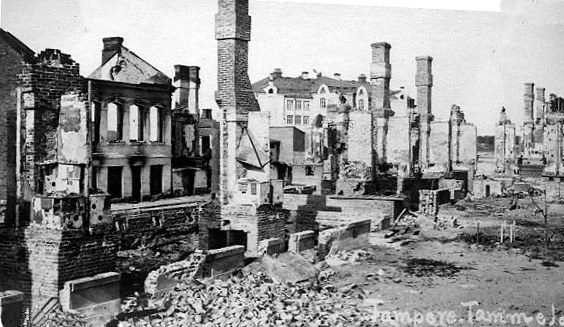
The city after the Battle of Tampere during the 1918 Civil War

After Finland gained its full independence, Tampere played an important role in the 1918 Civil War, being one of the most strategically important places for the Finnish Socialist Workers' Republic (FSWR) during the Finnish Civil War (28 January - 15 May 1918); the city was the most important industrial city in Finland at the beginning of the 20th century, with a huge working population. Tampere was a Red stronghold during the war, commanded by Hugo Salmela. White forces led by General Mannerheim captured the city after the Battle of Tampere, taking about 10,000 Red prisoners on 6 April 1918.

During the Winter War, Tampere was bombed several times by the Soviet Union. The reason for the bombing of Tampere was that the city was an important railway junction and was also home to the State Aircraft Factory and the Tampella Factory, which produced ammunition and weapons, including grenade launchers. The most devastating bombing took place on 2 March 1940, when nine people were killed and 30 wounded. In addition, ten buildings were destroyed and 30 damaged that day.

=== Postwar period and modern day ===
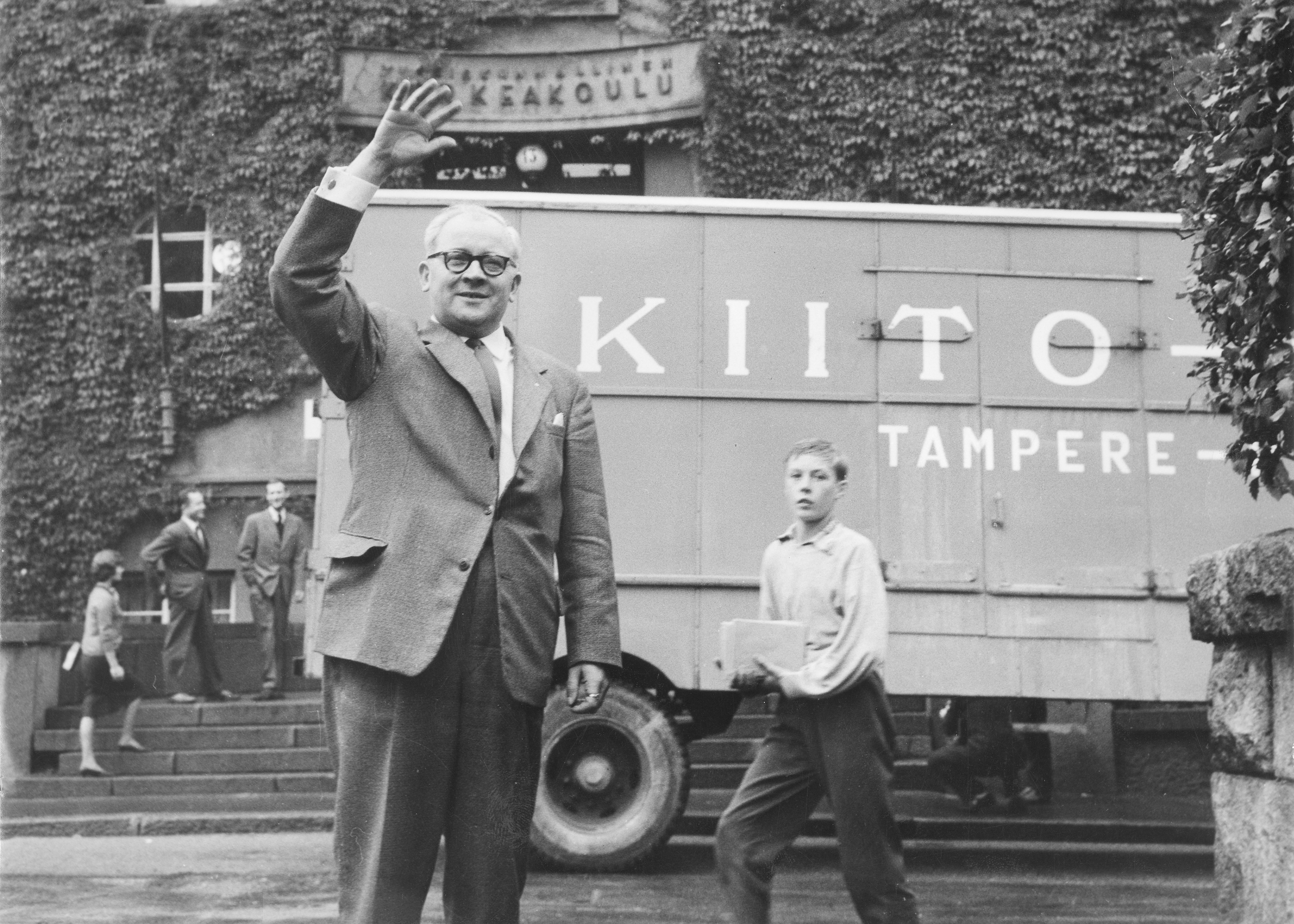
The Social University moves to Tampere in 1960.

The dominant force in Tampere's municipal politics after the Second World War was the Brothers-in-Arms Axis (aseveliakseli), which consisted mainly of the National Coalition Party and the Social Democrats. While the Centre Party was the largest political force in the Finnish countryside, it had no practical relevance in Tampere.

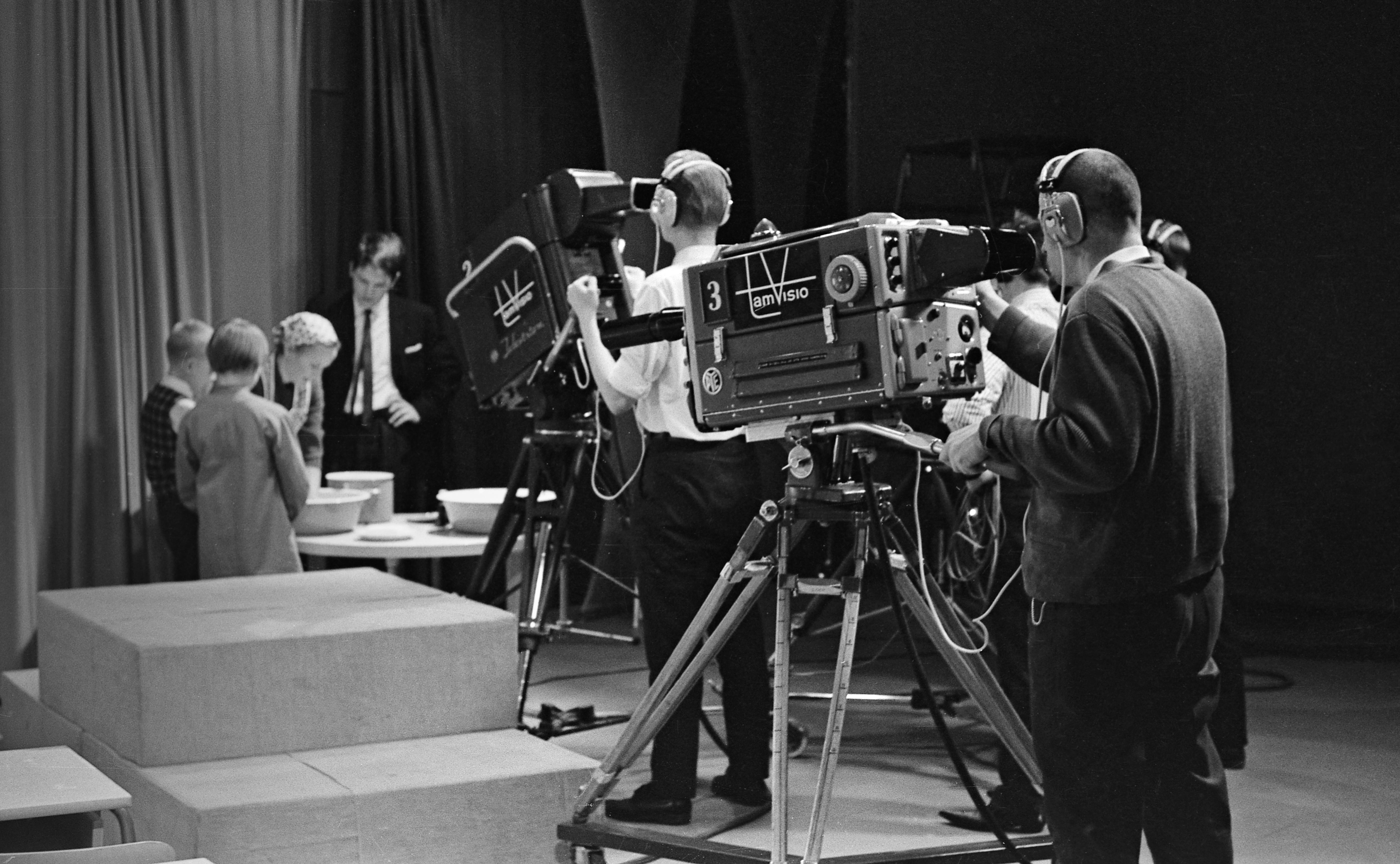
Tamvisio's camera operators film a television program at Frenckell's studio on 2 January 1965 in Tampere.

After the Second World War, Tampere was enlarged by the incorporation of some neighbouring areas. Messukylä was incorporated in 1947, Lielahti in 1950, Aitolahti in 1966 and Teisko in 1972. Already in 1937 the most part of modern western Tampere, including Pispala, was annexed to the city from North Pirkkala (today Nokia). Tampere passed the 100,000 population mark in 1950. Tampere was long known for its textile and metal industries, but these were largely replaced by information technology and telecommunications in the 1990s. The Hermia technology centre in Hervanta is home to many companies in these fields. Yleisradio began broadcasting its second television channel, Yle TV2, from Ristimäki, Tampere, in 1965, making Finland the first of the Nordic countries to receive a second television channel, after Sweden's SVT2 began broadcasting four years later. Tampere became a university city when the Social University moved from Helsinki to Tampere in 1960, becoming the University of Tampere in 1966. In 1979, the Tampere-Pirkkala airport was opened 13 km (8.1 mi) from the centre of Tampere on the Pirkkala side of the city.

At the turn of the 1990s, Tampere's industry underwent a major structural change, as the production of Tampella and Tampere's textile industry in particular was heavily focused on bilateral trade with the Soviet Union, but when the Soviet Union collapsed in 1991, the companies lost their main customers. As a result of the sudden change and the depression of the early 1990s, Finlayson and Suomen Trikoo had to scale down their operations drastically. Tampella went bankrupt. But although the change left a huge amount of vacant industrial space in the city centre, in the early 2000s it was gradually put to other uses, and today's Tampere cityscape is mainly characterised by strong IT companies, most notably Nokia's Tampere R&D units.

== Geography ==
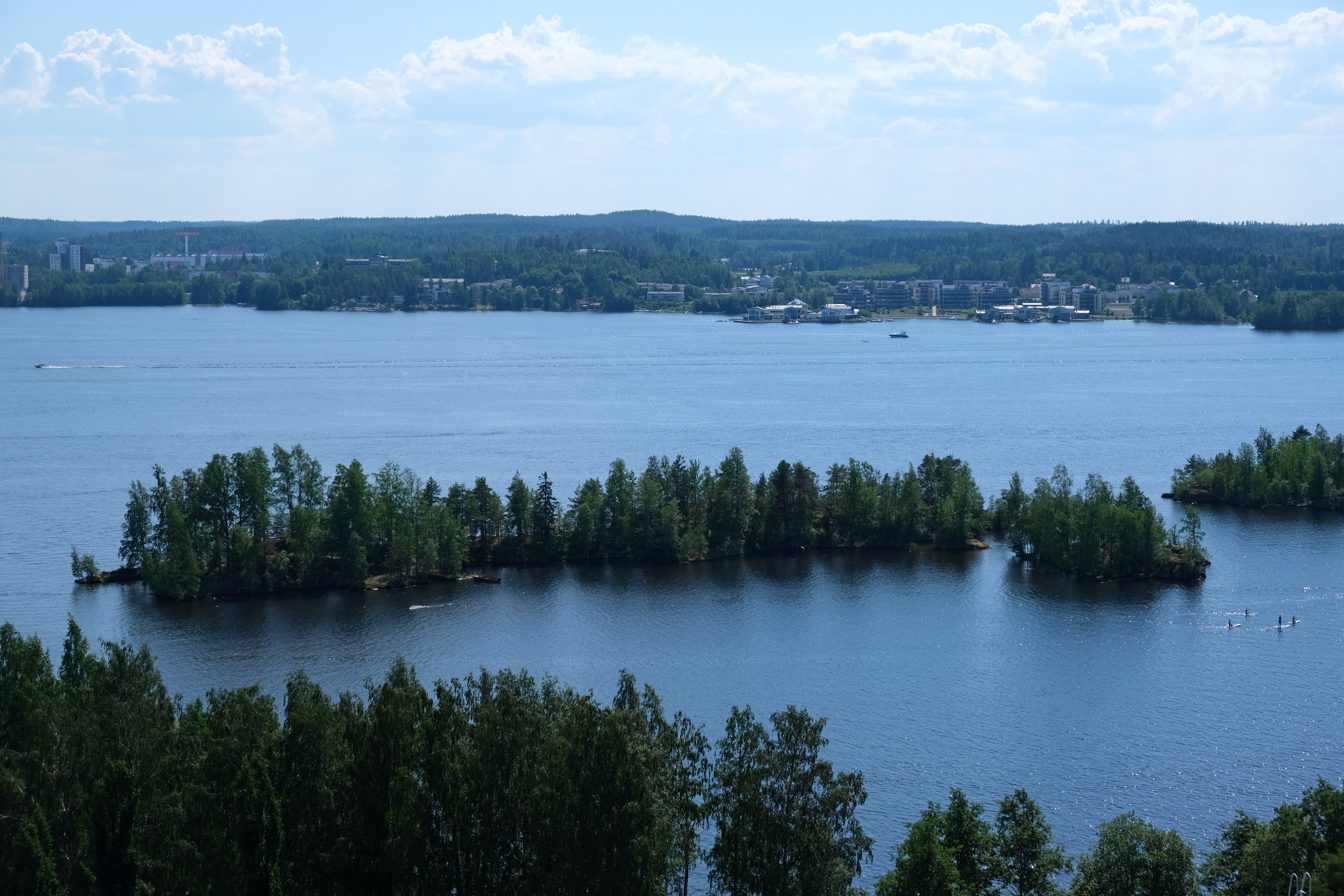
Islands of Pyynikki at the Lake Pyhäjärvi

Tampere is part of the Pirkanmaa region and is surrounded by the municipalities of Kangasala, Lempäälä, Nokia, Orivesi, Pirkkala, Ruovesi and Ylöjärvi. Tampere has 180 lakes larger than 10,000 m^{2} (110,000 sq ft), and freshwater bodies cover 24% of its area. The lakes formed as separate basins from Lake Ancylus about 7500–8000 years ago. Tampere's northernmost point is in the Vankavesi Fjard of Teisko, the southernmost at the eastern end of Lake Hervanta, the easternmost at the northeast corner of Lake Paalijärvi of Teisko, and the westernmost at the southeast corner of Lake Haukijärvi near the borders of Ylöjärvi and Nokia. The city centre is surrounded by three lakes, Näsijärvi, Pyhäjärvi, and the much smaller Iidesjärvi. The Tampere region lies in the basin of the Kokemäki River, which flows into the Bothnian Sea through Pori, the capital of the Satakunta region. Tampere's bedrock consists of mica schist and migmatite, and its building stone deposits are diverse: in addition to the traditional granite, there is an abundance of quartz diorite, tonalite, mica schist and mica gneiss. One of Tampere's most striking geographic features is the Pyynikki Ridge (Pyynikinharju), a large esker formed from moraine during the Weichselian glaciation. It rises 160 m (520 ft) above sea level and is said to be the largest gravel esker in the world. It is also part of Salpausselkä, a 200 km (120 mi) long ridge system left over from the Ice Age.

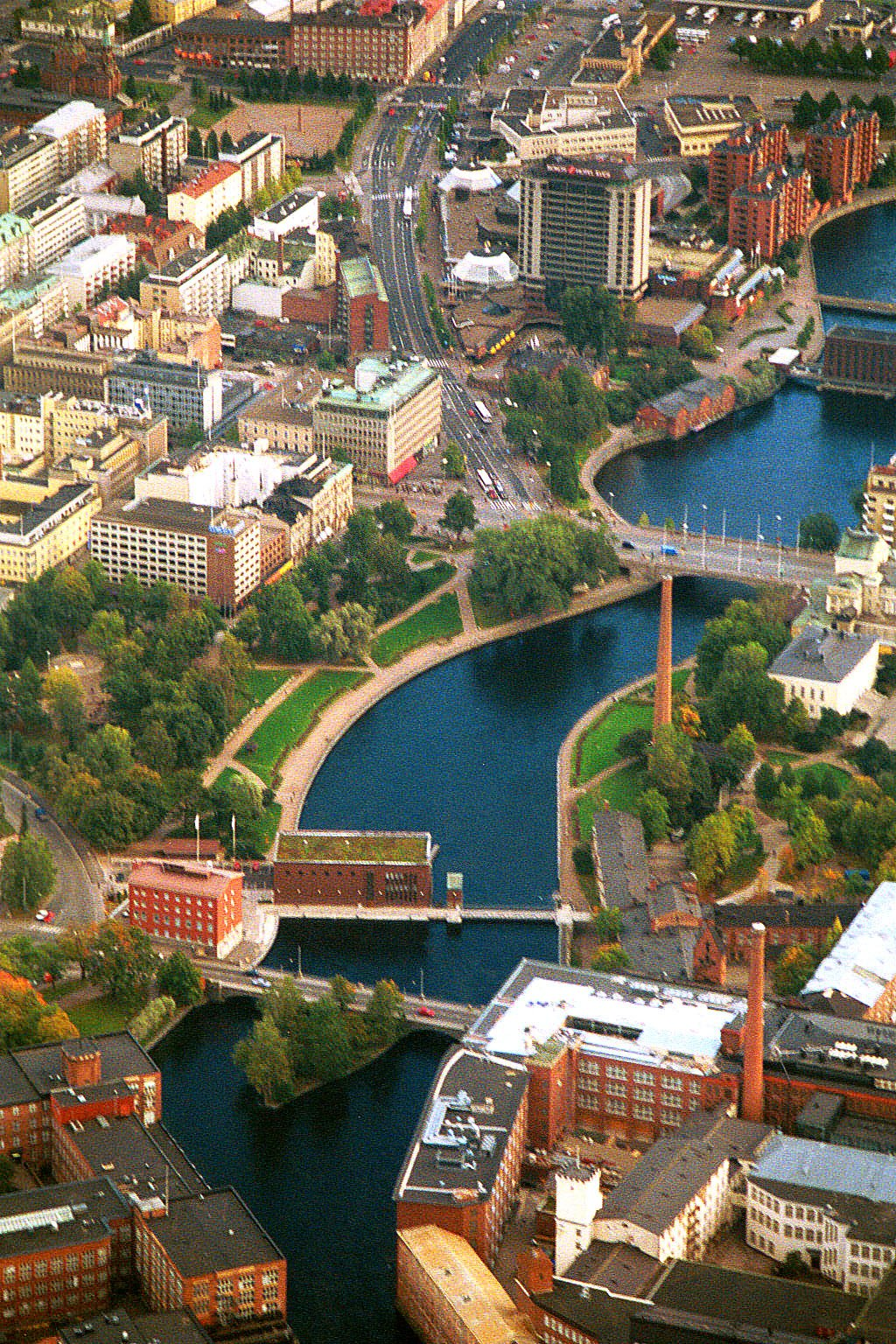
Aerial view of the city center of Tampere (Keskusta) and the Tammerkoski rapids passing through it, c. 2001

The centre of Tampere (Keskusta) and the districts of Pyynikki, Ylä-Pispala and Ala-Pispala lie on the isthmus between Lakes Pyhäjärvi and Näsijärvi. The city's location on the edge of the Tammerkoski Rapids between two long waterways was one of the main reasons for its foundation in the 1770s. The streets of central Tampere form a typical grid pattern. On the western edge of the city centre is a north–south park road, Hämeenpuisto ("Häme Park" or "Tavastia Park"), which runs from the shore of Lake Pyhäjärvi near Lake Näsijärvi. The wide Hämeenkatu road runs east–west from Tampere Central Station to Hämeenpuisto and crosses Tammerkoski along the Hämeensilta bridge. Also along Hämeenkatu is the longest street in the city centre, Satakunnankatu, which runs from Rautatienkatu to Amuri and crosses Tammerkoski via the Satakunnansilta bridge. Tampere's central square is located on the western bank of Tammerkoski, near Hämeensilta. The traffic centre of Tampere is the junction of Itsenäisyydenkatu, (Note: Formerly known as Puolimatkankatu) Teiskontie, Sammonkatu, Kalevanpuisto park road and the Kaleva and Liisankallio districts.

=== Neighbourhoods and other subdivisions ===
The city of Tampere is divided into seven statistical areas, each of which includes the many districts and their suburbs. There are 111 statistical areas in Tampere, but the statistical areas created for Tampere's statistics do not fully correspond to the division of Tampere's districts or to the way residents perceive the districts. For example, the districts of Amuri, Kyttälä and Tammela are divided into two parts in accordance with the official district division, and Liisankallio and Kalevanrinne are often considered to belong to the district of Kaleva.

=== Climate ===
Tampere

Climate chart (precipitation, max. and min. temperature)
J	F	M	A	M	J	J	A	S	O	N	D
41 −3 −10	29 −4 −11	31 1 −7	32 8 −1	41 15 4	66 20 9	75 22 12	72 20 10	58 14 6	60 8 2	51 2 −3	42 −2 −8
- █ Average max. and min. temperatures in °C
- █ Precipitation totals in mm
Imperial conversion
J	F	M	A	M	J	J	A	S	O	N	D
1.6 26 15	1.1 26 13	1.2 34 20	1.3 47 30	1.6 60 39	2.6 67 47	3 72 53	2.8 68 51	2.3 57 43	2.4 46 35	2 35 27	1.7 29 18
- █ Average max. and min. temperatures in °F
- █ Precipitation totals in inches

Tampere has a humid continental climate Dfb with clearly defined four seasons. The climate of Tampere-Pirkkala Airport, which is located away from the city centre, borders on the subarctic climate zone (Köppen climate classification Dfc). Winters are cold and the average temperature from December to February is below −3 °C (27 °F) and it can reach to −30 °C (−22 °F) . Summers are cool to warm. The average snow cover lasts 4–5 months from late November to early April. Given the high latitude and inland location, winters are on average quite mild for the latitude, as is the average annual temperature.

Climate data for Tampere Härmälä (TMP), elevation: 85 m (279 ft), 1991–2020 normals, extremes 1900–present (Härmälä and Tampella)
Month	Jan	Feb	Mar	Apr	May	Jun	Jul	Aug	Sep	Oct	Nov	Dec	Year
Record high °C (°F)	8.4 (47.1)	9.2 (48.6)	15.6 (60.1)	24.3 (75.7)	29.6 (85.3)	33.2 (91.8)	33.1 (91.6)	32.1 (89.8)	26.7 (80.1)	19.4 (66.9)	13.3 (55.9)	10.5 (50.9)	33.1 (91.6)
Mean daily maximum °C (°F)	−2.5 (27.5)	−2.5 (27.5)	2.1 (35.8)	8.8 (47.8)	15.6 (60.1)	19.7 (67.5)	22.5 (72.5)	20.7 (69.3)	14.9 (58.8)	7.8 (46.0)	2.6 (36.7)	−0.5 (31.1)	9.1 (48.4)
Daily mean °C (°F)	−5.2 (22.6)	−5.7 (21.7)	−1.9 (28.6)	3.9 (39.0)	10.1 (50.2)	14.6 (58.3)	17.3 (63.1)	15.6 (60.1)	10.6 (51.1)	4.9 (40.8)	0.7 (33.3)	−2.7 (27.1)	5.2 (41.3)
Mean daily minimum °C (°F)	−8.3 (17.1)	−9.1 (15.6)	−6.0 (21.2)	−0.9 (30.4)	4.1 (39.4)	9.0 (48.2)	12.2 (54.0)	10.8 (51.4)	6.6 (43.9)	2.0 (35.6)	−1.5 (29.3)	−5.4 (22.3)	1.1 (34.0)
Record low °C (°F)	−37.0 (−34.6)	−36.8 (−34.2)	−29.6 (−21.3)	−19.6 (−3.3)	−7.3 (18.9)	−2.8 (27.0)	1.8 (35.2)	−0.4 (31.3)	−6.7 (19.9)	−14.8 (5.4)	−22.5 (−8.5)	−34.2 (−29.6)	−37.0 (−34.6)
Average precipitation mm (inches)	41 (1.6)	30 (1.2)	29 (1.1)	32 (1.3)	36 (1.4)	66 (2.6)	74 (2.9)	65 (2.6)	55 (2.2)	57 (2.2)	51 (2.0)	46 (1.8)	582 (22.9)
Average snowfall cm (inches)	32.3 (12.7)	31.4 (12.4)	29.5 (11.6)	13.9 (5.5)	1.6 (0.6)	0.1 (0.0)	0 (0)	0 (0)	0 (0)	3.3 (1.3)	13.1 (5.2)	27.2 (10.7)	152.4 (60)
Average precipitation days (≥ 1 mm)	10	8	8	7	7	9	11	9	9	10	10	11	109
Average relative humidity (%)	90	87	82	70	63	66	69	76	82	87	91	92	80
Source 1: weatheronline.co.uk
Source 2: FMI (precipitation, record highs and lows)

Climate data for Tampere–Pirkkala Airport (1991-2020 normals, extremes 1979-present)
Month	Jan	Feb	Mar	Apr	May	Jun	Jul	Aug	Sep	Oct	Nov	Dec	Year
Record high °C (°F)	8.0 (46.4)	9.4 (48.9)	14.9 (58.8)	24.2 (75.6)	29.3 (84.7)	33.0 (91.4)	32.5 (90.5)	31.3 (88.3)	26.6 (79.9)	18.3 (64.9)	13.2 (55.8)	10.3 (50.5)	33.0 (91.4)
Mean maximum °C (°F)	3.9 (39.0)	3.9 (39.0)	9.0 (48.2)	17.7 (63.9)	24.4 (75.9)	26.8 (80.2)	28.2 (82.8)	26.6 (79.9)	21.2 (70.2)	13.7 (56.7)	8.5 (47.3)	4.8 (40.6)	29.2 (84.6)
Mean daily maximum °C (°F)	−2.7 (27.1)	−2.8 (27.0)	1.7 (35.1)	8.5 (47.3)	15.2 (59.4)	19.6 (67.3)	22.2 (72.0)	20.5 (68.9)	14.7 (58.5)	7.5 (45.5)	2.3 (36.1)	−0.7 (30.7)	8.8 (47.9)
Daily mean °C (°F)	−5.6 (21.9)	−6.0 (21.2)	−2.3 (27.9)	3.6 (38.5)	9.8 (49.6)	14.3 (57.7)	17.1 (62.8)	15.5 (59.9)	10.4 (50.7)	4.6 (40.3)	0.3 (32.5)	−3.2 (26.2)	4.9 (40.8)
Mean daily minimum °C (°F)	−8.6 (16.5)	−9.3 (15.3)	−6.3 (20.7)	−1.0 (30.2)	3.9 (39.0)	8.9 (48.0)	12.1 (53.8)	10.8 (51.4)	6.5 (43.7)	1.7 (35.1)	−1.9 (28.6)	−5.8 (21.6)	0.9 (33.7)
Mean minimum °C (°F)	−22.9 (−9.2)	−22.5 (−8.5)	−17.3 (0.9)	−8.5 (16.7)	−3.1 (26.4)	2.1 (35.8)	5.9 (42.6)	4.1 (39.4)	−1.3 (29.7)	−7.1 (19.2)	−11.3 (11.7)	−17.6 (0.3)	−26.0 (−14.8)
Record low °C (°F)	−35.8 (−32.4)	−31.8 (−25.2)	−29.1 (−20.4)	−14.8 (5.4)	−7.2 (19.0)	−3.0 (26.6)	1.5 (34.7)	−0.4 (31.3)	−7.0 (19.4)	−16.4 (2.5)	−21.9 (−7.4)	−33.0 (−27.4)	−35.8 (−32.4)
Average relative humidity (%)	91	88	80	70	64	68	72	77	83	88	92	92	80
Source 1: https://www.ilmatieteenlaitos.fi/ilmastollinen-vertailukausi
Source 2: https://kilotavu.com/asema-taulukko.php?asema=101118

==== Temperature records of Tampere ====
Temperature records of Tampere and the near-by Tampere–Pirkkala Airport:

Temperature Records of Tampere

Tampere highest temperatures by month
Month	°C (°F)	Date	Location
June	33.2 (91.8)	22 June 2021	Härmälä
July	33.1 (91.6)	9 July 1914	Härmälä
August	32.1 (89.8)	10 August 1912	Härmälä

Highest temperatures at the Tampere–Pirkkala Airport by month since 1980:

Pirkkala Airport highest temperatures by month
Month	°C (°F)	Year
January	8.0 (46.4)	2007
February	9.4 (48.9)	1990
March	14.9 (58.8)	2007
April	24.2 (75.6)	1998
May	29.3 (84.7)	2014
June	31.7 (89.1)	1999
July	32.5 (90.5)	2010
August	31.1 (88.0)	1992
September	24.8 (76.6)	1999
October	17.5 (63.5)	1984
November	12.4 (54.3)	2015
December	10.3 (50.5)	2015

Lowest temperatures in Pirkanmaa:

Tampere lowest temperatures by month
Month	°C (°F)	Date	Location
January	−38.5 (−37.3)	9 January 1987	Aitoneva, Kihniö
February	−40.9 (−41.6)	3 February 1966	Mouhijärvi

Lowest temperatures at the Tampere–Pirkkala Airport by month since 1980:

Pirkkala Airport lowest temperatures by month
Month	°C (°F)	Year
January	−35.8 (−32.4)	1987
February	−31.8 (−25.2)	2007
March	−29.1 (−20.4)	1981
April	−14.8 (5.4)	1988
May	−7.2 (19.0)	1999
June	−3.0 (26.6)	1984
July	1.5 (34.7)	1987
August	−0.4 (31.3)	1984
September	−7.0 (19.4)	1986
October	−16.4 (2.5)	1992
November	−22.0 (−7.6)	1990
December	−33.0 (−27.4)	1995

== Cityscape ==
=== Revival and nationalism ===
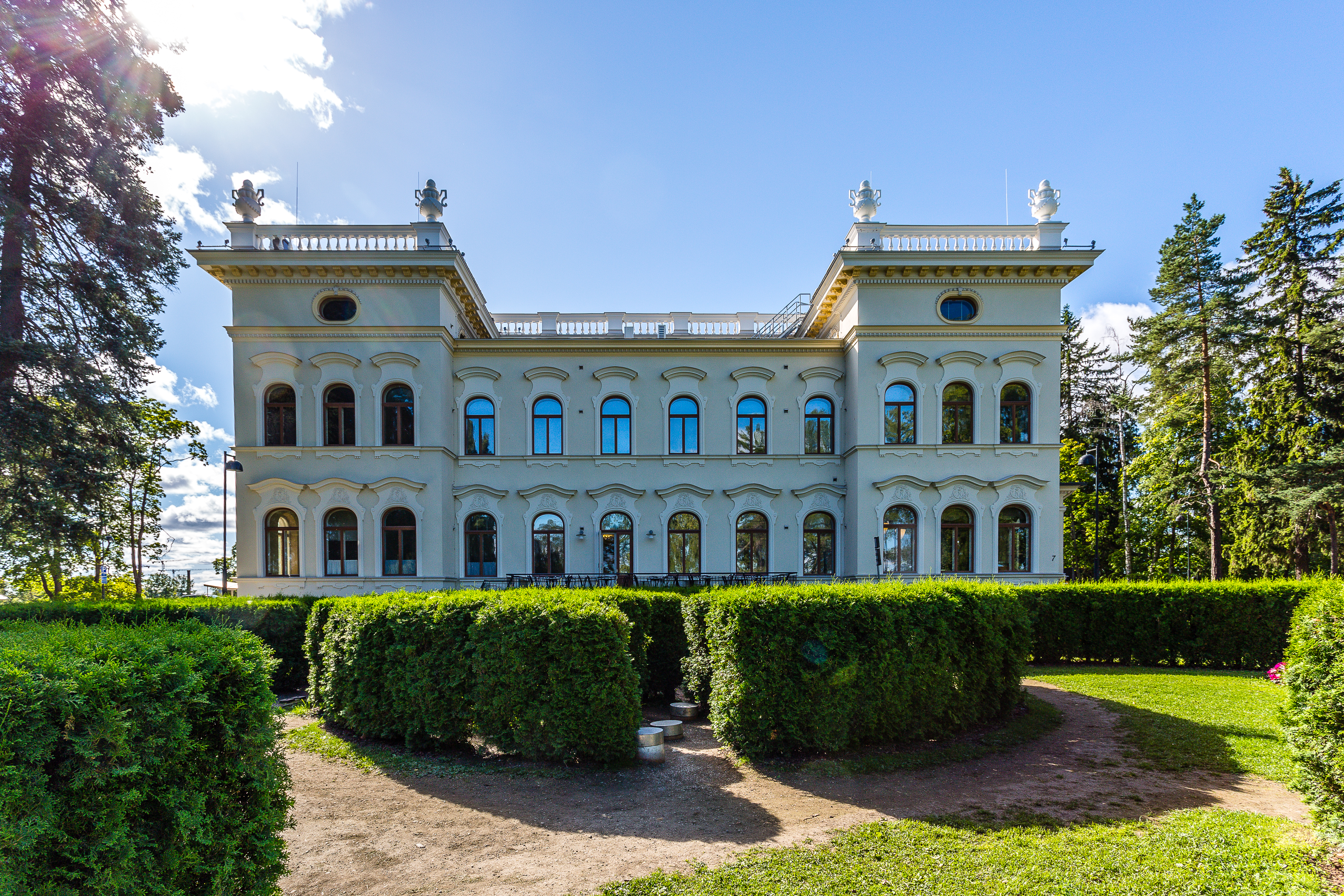
Näsilinna, the Baroque Revival palace

Tampere has buildings from many architectural periods. The Old Stone Church of Messukylä is the only example of medieval architecture. Neoclassicism from the early 19th century is represented by the Old Church of Tampere and its bell tower. The Gothic Revival buildings in Tampere that evolved from Neoclassicism are the New Church of Messukylä and the Alexander Church, while the Renaissance Revival buildings are Hatanpää Manor, Tampere City Hall, Ruuskanen House and Näsilinna. Romantic nationalism can be seen in the Commerce house, the Tirkkonen House, the Palander House, the Tampere Cathedral, the Tampere Central Fire Station and the Tampere National Bank building. The use of red brick as a building material in the industrial buildings along Tammerkoski, such as the Finlayson and Tampella factories, has left a strong imaginary mark on the city.

=== Functionalism and modernism ===
The Post-Art Nouveau was largely Nordic, with the Laikku House of Culture, the Hotel Tammer, the Tuulensuu House and the Viinikka Church built in Tampere. After Functionalism became the dominant style in the 1930s, Tampere Central Station, Tempo House, a bus station and Kauppi Hospital were built in Tampere. There is no single accepted term for the post-war style, but the main representatives of the reconstruction period are the Bank of Finland building, the Amurinlinna building and the Pyynikki swimming pool. The rationalist buildings of the modernist period are represented by the University of Tampere, Tampere Central Hospital, Sampola, the School of Economics, Ratina Stadium and Kaleva Church. The modernist buildings include the Metso Main Library, the Hervanta Operations Centre, the Tampere Hall, the university extension and the Nokia office building in Hatanpää.

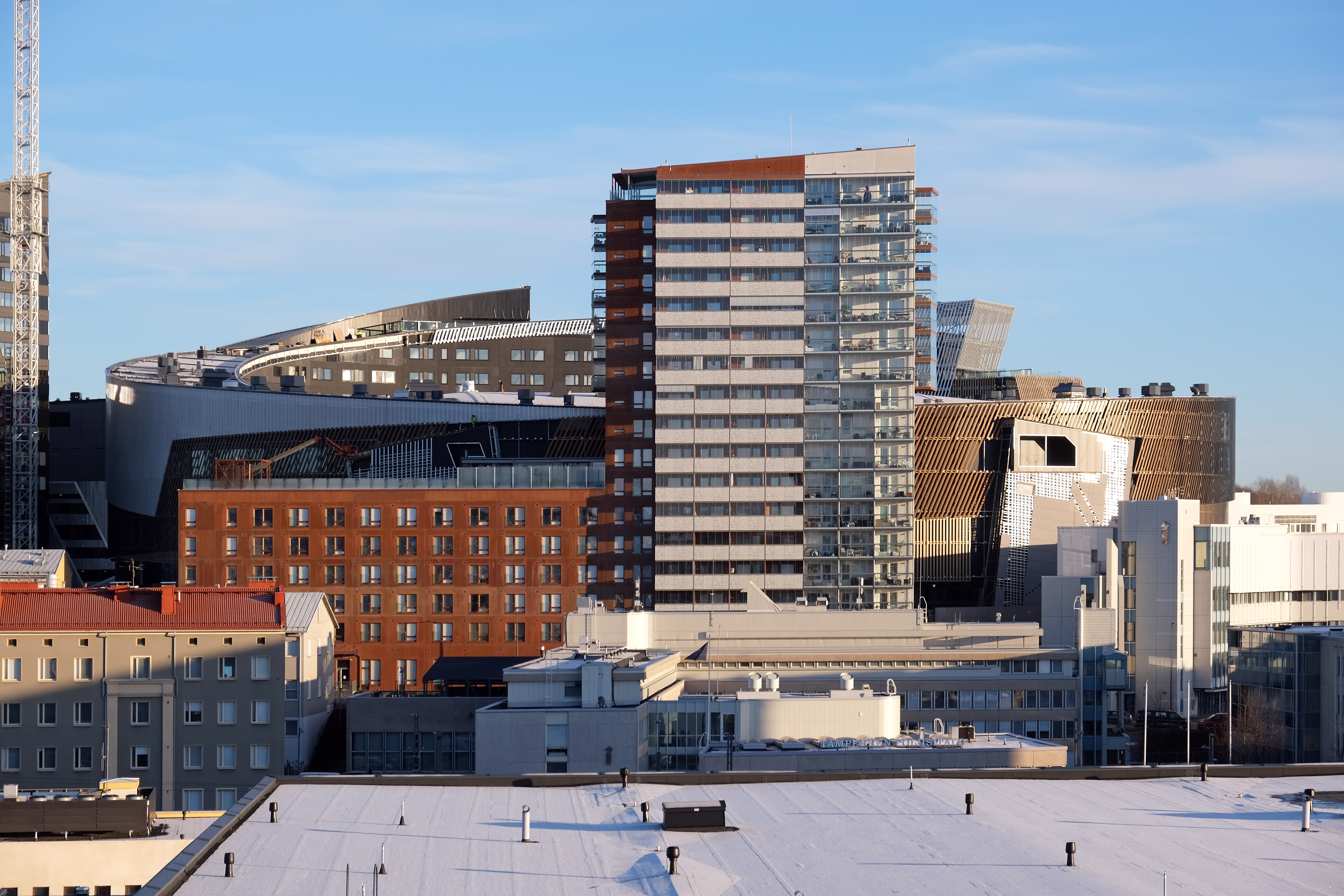
The city of Tampere has shown strong growth in recent years. The "Tampere Deck" and its new multi-purpose arena in November 2021.

The centre of Tampere and its western parts have been developed in a more modern direction since the 2010s, and the city aims to have the centre in its future form by the 2030s. In particular, plans have been drawn up for the area around the central railway station in the form of the "Tampere Deck" project, which includes a new multi-purpose arena and high-rise buildings in the area. A light rail network has also recently been built in the city centre. Artificial island projects are planned on the shores of the lakes, which would create new residential areas for several thousand people. The projects are estimated to cost several billion euros.

== Economy ==
The Tampere region, Pirkanmaa, which includes outlying municipalities, has around 509,000 residents, 244,000 employed people, and a turnover of €28 billion as of 2014.

According to the Tampere International Business Office, the area is strong in mechanical engineering and automation, information and communication technologies, and health and biotechnology, as well as pulp and paper industry education. Unemployment rate was 9.2% in September 2023. 70% of the areas jobs are in the service sector. Less than 20% are in the manufacturing sector. 34.5% of employed people live outside the Tampere municipality and commute to Tampere for work. Meanwhile, 15.6% of Tampere's residents work outside Tampere.

In 2014 the largest employers were Kesko, Pirkanmaan Osuuskauppa, Alma Media and Posti Group. Tampere is headquarters for Bronto Skylift, an aerial rescue and aerial work platform manufacturer.

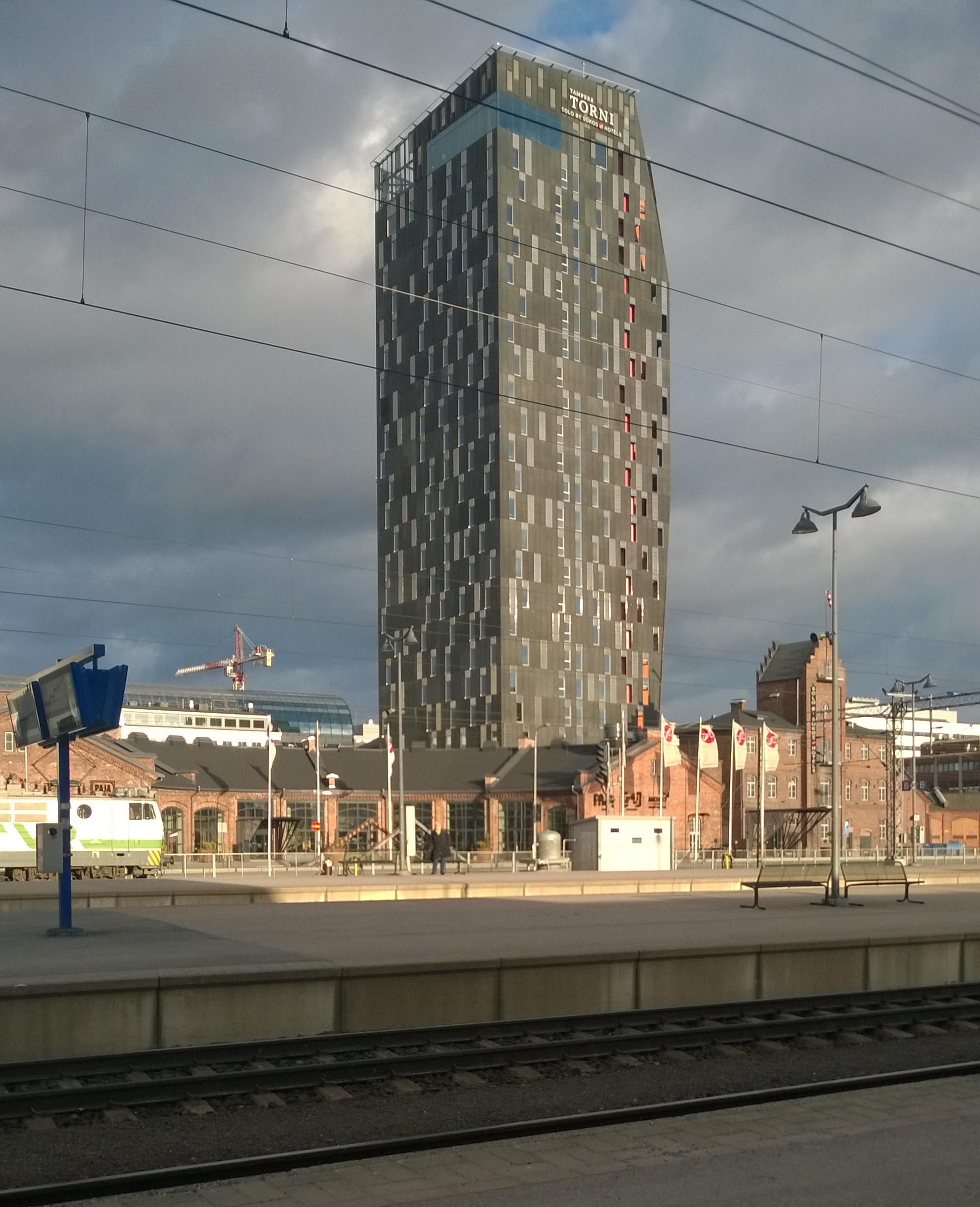
Tampere's Hotel Torni, the tallest hotel in Finland

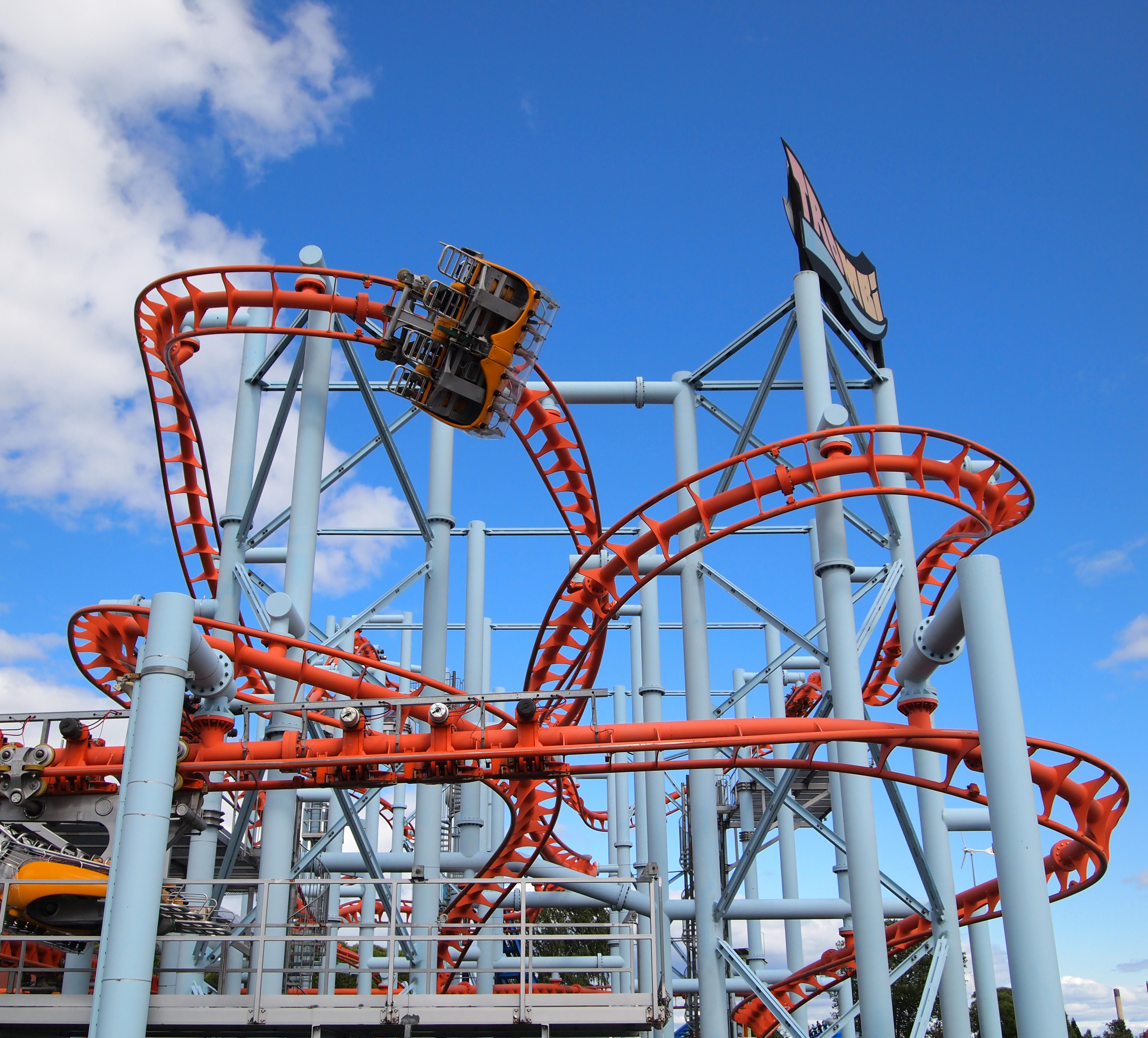
Särkänniemi amusement park is the most popular tourist destination of Tampere.

According to a study carried out by the TAK Research, the total impact of tourism in the Tampere region in 2022 was more than €562 million. Tourism also brought 4,805 person-years to the region. Tampere's biggest single attraction is the Särkänniemi amusement park, which had about 552,000 visitors in 2023. That year, 1.4 million overnight stays were made in Tampere hotels and 300,000 in other commercial accommodations. The number exceeded the previous record year 2022 by seven percent. Tampere has Finland's second-most hotel stays. Leisure tourism accounted for 865,000 overnight stays and occupational tourism for 551,000. Income from accommodations was €116.9 million in 2023 (up 7.2 million from 2022).

Tampere's financial result in 2023 was €55.3 million. The result was heavily affected by one-off payments . In the city's economy, the largest revenues come from taxes and government contributions. In 2023, the city received €477.8 million in municipal tax revenue. In addition, €98 million came from corporate taxes and €105.3 million from property taxes. Increase in municipal tax revenue was 6.9 percent, the highest amount among big cities. Government contributions were €58.3 million. Due to the health and social services reform, the statements of municipal and corporation tax revenue or state contributions are not comparable with previous years.

Tampere municipal tax rate in 2024 is 7.6%.

== Energy ==
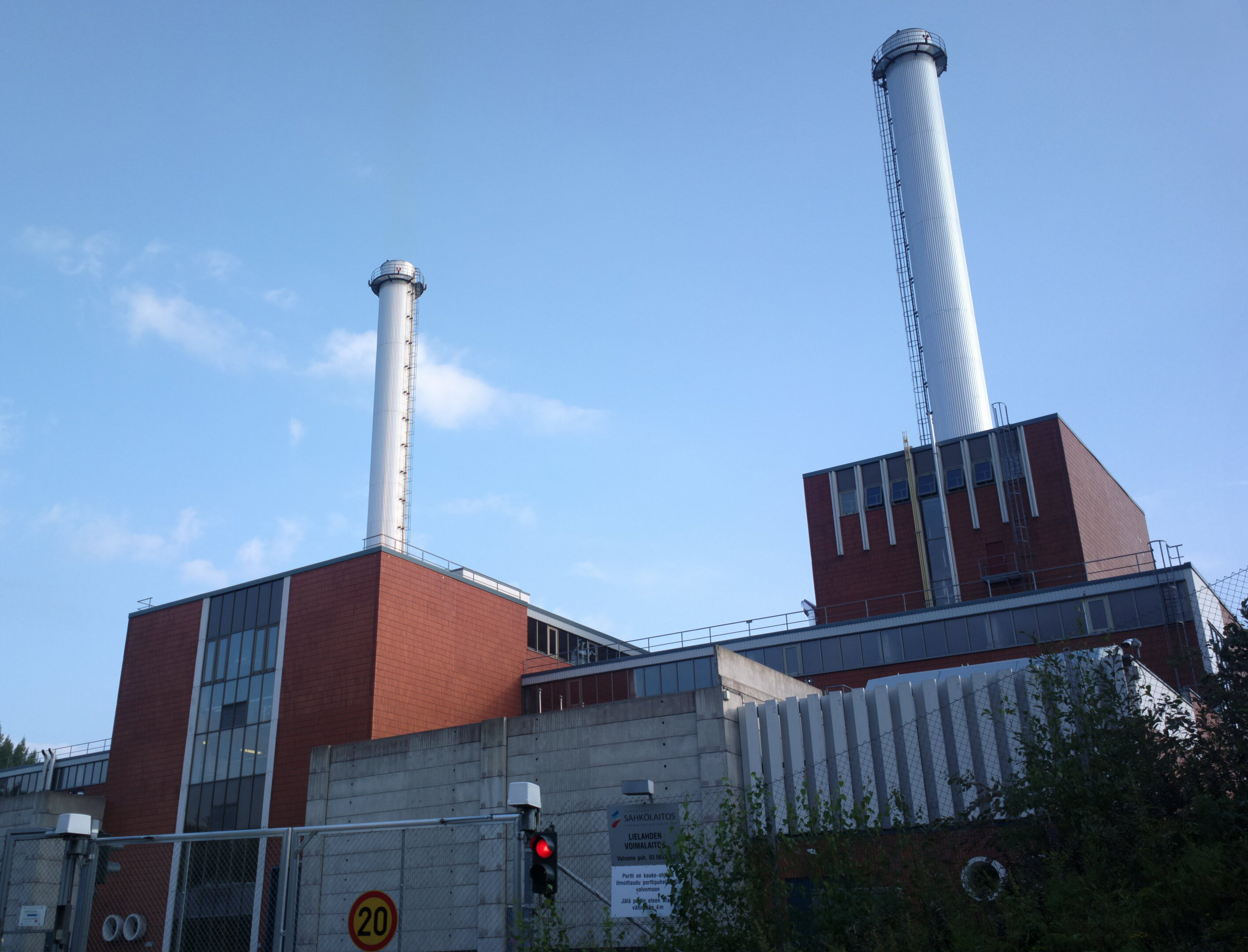
Lielahti Power Plant

In 2013, Tampereen Energiantuotanto, which is part of the Tampereen Energia (formerly Tampereen Sähkölaitos Group), generated 1,254 GWh of electricity and 2,184 GWh of district heating. The two units of the Naistenlahti power station accounted for about 65% of the total electricity production and the Lielahti power station for about 30%. The Naistenlahti and Lielahti units accounted for 57% and 23% of district heating production, respectively. The ten heating centres in Tampere accounted for 21%.

In 2023, the share of renewable energy in the district heating production was around 80%. The goal was to end the use of peat completely during that year. Hydropower, wood and nuclear power were used as well as mixed waste, of which 50% is considered renewable. Emissions from energy production have decreased in the 21st century due to the growth of renewable forms of production and the modernisation of the Naistenlahti power plant. In 2013, about 669,000 tonnes of carbon dioxide and 297 tonnes of sulphur dioxide were emitted.

== Water and waste management ==
75% of Tampere's domestic water is surface water and 25% groundwater. 58% of the water is diverted to economic use and 13% to industrial use. In addition to Tampere, Tampereen Vesi manages water in Pirkkala. Almost all surface water comes from Lake Roine. In addition, Tampereen Vesi has three surface water plants in Lake Näsijärvi and five groundwater intakes. Tampereen Vesi is responsible for 96% of wastewater from Tampere, Kangasala, Pirkkala and Ylöjärvi. In 2023, a total of 33 million cubic meters of wastewater was treated in Tampere. The Viinikanlahti treatment plant treats more than 75% of wastewater.

The new central treatment plant in Sulkavuori will open in 2025. It is a joint project of Tampere, Kangasala, Pirkkala, Ylöjärvi, Lempäälä and Vesilahti, with a treatment capacity of 100 000 cubic metres of wastewater per day.

Pirkanmaan Jätehuolto handles waste management in Tampere. It has waste treatment facilities in Nokia's Lake Koukkujärvi and Tampere's Lake Tarastenjärvi.

== Demographics ==
=== Population ===
Historical population
Year	Pop.	±% p.a.
1815	793	—
1840	1,819	+3.38%
1850	3,207	+5.83%
1860	5,232	+5.02%
1870	6,986	+2.93%
1880	13,645	+6.92%
1890	20,132	+3.97%
1900	36,344	+6.09%
1910	45,442	+2.26%
1920	47,830	+0.51%
1930	50,138	+0.47%
1939	78,012	+5.03%
1972	163,609	+2.27%
1980	166,228	+0.20%
1990	172,560	+0.37%
2000	195,468	+1.25%
2010	213,217	+0.87%
2020	241,009	+1.23%
Source: Tilastollinen päätoimisto, Statistics Finland (1972-2020)

The city of Tampere has 263,337 inhabitants, making it the 3rd most populous municipality in Finland and the tenth in the Nordics. The Tampere region, with 427,749 people, is the second largest after the Helsinki metropolitan area. Tampere is home to 5% of Finland's population. 12% of the population has a foreign background, which is above the national average. However, it is lower than in the major Finnish cities of Helsinki, Espoo, Vantaa or Turku.

The demographic structure of Tampere shows that the city is a very popular place to study, as the number of young adults is significantly higher than in other municipalities in the region. At the end of 2012, the old-age dependency ratio was 45. 19.2% of the population was over the age of 64 in 2024. Just over half of the population is female, as in the country as a whole. The population is fairly well educated, with two-thirds of those over 15 having completed post-primary education.

At the end of 2018, there were a total of 140,039 dwellings in Tampere, of which 127,639 were permanently occupied and 12,400 were not permanently occupied. Of these, 74% were apartment buildings, 14% were detached houses, 10% were terraced houses, and 2% were other residential buildings. Between 2002 and 2020, more than 40,000 new dwellings will be completed in Tampere. Living space has been growing for a long time, although after 2008 growth came to a virtual standstill. The average living space at the end of 2012 was about 36.8 m^{2} per inhabitant, compared with about 19.2 m^{2} in 1970 and about 31.8 m^{2} in 1990. The average dwelling had about 1.8 inhabitants in 2012.

For more than ten years, Tampere has been one of the most migratory municipalities, as more than 1,930 new residents moved to Tampere in January–September 2021. Nokia, Kangasala and Lempäälä, which are among Tampere's neighbouring municipalities, have also been identified as the most migratory municipalities, rising to the list of the 20 most attractive municipalities. Even during the COVID-19 pandemic, Tampere has become Finland's most attractive area for internal migration, as Tampere gained the most migration gains in 2020.

Population size 1980–2025
Year	Population
1980	166,228
1985	169,026
1990	172,560
1995	182,742
2000	195,468
2005	204,337
2010	213,217
2015	225,118
2020	241,009
2025	263,337

=== Languages ===
Population by
mother tongue (2025)
1. Finnish (87.5%)
2. Russian (1.40%)
3. Arabic (1.00%)
4. Persian (1.00%)
5. English (0.90%)
6. Swedish (0.50%)
7. Vietnamese (0.50%)
8. Other (7.20%)

Tampere is the largest monolingual Finnish-speaking municipality. The majority of the population, 230,453 persons (87.5%), spoke Finnish as their first language. In addition, the number of Swedish speakers was 1,383 persons (0.5%) of the population. This is the second largest number of Swedish speakers in monolingual Finnish-speaking municipalities after Kaarina. Kaarina and Tampere are also the only monolingual Finnish-speaking municipalities with a separate Swedish-speaking community. Swedish speakers made up more than 6% of Tampere's population in 1900 and less than 2% in 1950.

Foreign languages were spoken by 12% of the population. As English and Swedish are compulsory school subjects, functional bilingualism or trilingualism acquired through language studies is not uncommon.

At least 160 different languages are spoken in Tampere. The most widely spoken foreign languages are Russian (1.4%), Arabic (1.0%), Persian (1.0%), English (0.9%), and Vietnamese (0.5%).

=== Immigration ===
Population by country of birth (2025)
Country of birth	Population	%
Finland	233,290	88.6
Soviet Union	2,750	1.0
Afghanistan	1,385	0.5
India	1,261	0.5
Vietnam	1,245	0.5
Sweden	1,239	0.5
Iraq	1,176	0.4
Iran	1,152	0.4
Philippines	1,135	0.4
China	1,128	0.4
Other	17,556	6.7

As of 2024, there were 29,841 people with a foreign background living in Tampere, or 12% of the population. (Note: Statistics Finland classifies a person as having a "foreign background" if both parents or the only known parent were born abroad.) There were 28,352 residents who were born abroad, or 11% of the population. The number of foreign citizens in Tampere was 19,576. Most foreign-born citizens came from the former Soviet Union, Afghanistan, Sweden, Iraq, India, China, Russia, Iran, Estonia, Vietnam, Philippines and Estonia.

The proportion of immigrants in Tampere's population is slightly above the national average. Tampere attracts more migration from within Finland than directly from abroad. Nevertheless, the city's new residents are increasingly of foreign origin. This will increase the proportion of foreign residents in the coming years.

=== Urban areas ===
In 2019, out of the total population of 238,140, 231,648 people lived in urban areas and 3,132 in sparsely populated areas, while the coordinates of 3,360 people were unknown. This made Tampere's degree of urbanization 98.7%. The urban population in the municipality was divided between three statistical urban areas as follows:

#	Urban area	Population
1	Tampere urban area	225,440
2	Vuores	5,316
3	Kämmenniemi	892

=== Religion ===
In 2023, the Evangelical Lutheran Church was the largest religious group with 56.4% of the population of Tampere. Other religious groups accounted for 3.3% of the population. 40.3% of the population had no religious affiliation.

== Education ==
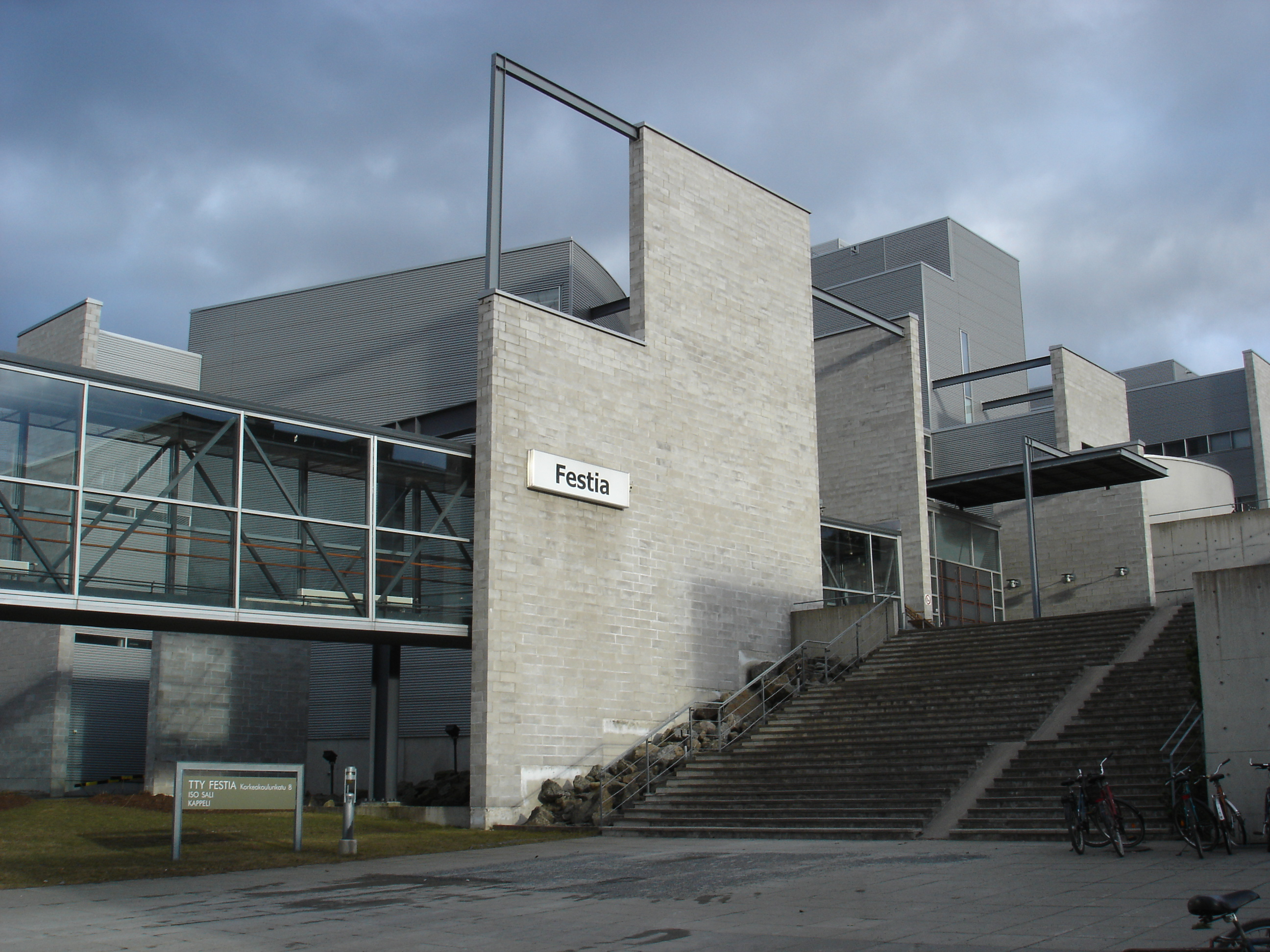
Tampere University, Festia building

The comprehensive education is given mainly in Finnish but the city has special bilingual groups where students study in Finnish and a second language (English, French or German). Furthermore, there is a private Swedish-speaking school in the Kaakinmaa district (Swedish Svenska samskolan i Tammerfors) that covers all levels of education from preschool to high school. A fully English-language program will begin at Pyynikki High School (Pyynikin lukio) in August 2026. The program is intended for young people whose language skills are not sufficient to study high school in Finnish or Swedish. English-language matriculation examinations will begin in autumn 2028.

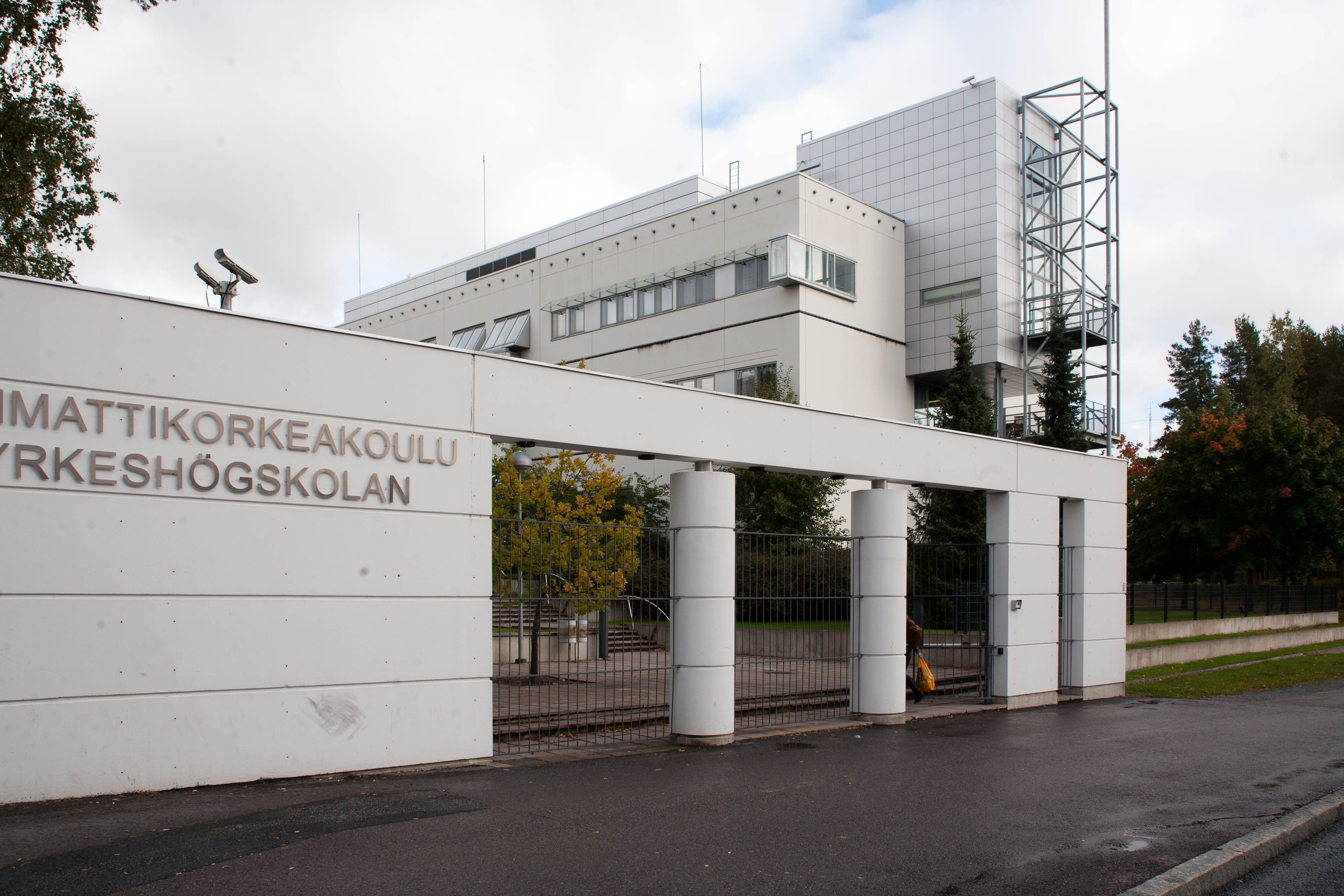
The campus building of the Police University College

There are three institutions of higher education in the Tampere area totaling 40,000 students: the university and two polytechnic institutions (Finnish: ammattikorkeakoulu). Tampere University (TUNI) has over 20,000 students and two campuses, one in the Kalevanharju district, close to the city centre, and one in Hervanta, in the southern part of the city. The institution was formed in 2019 as a result of the merge of University of Tampere (UTA) and Tampere University of Technology (TUT). TUNI is also the major shareholder of the Tampere University of Applied Sciences (Tampereen ammattikorkeakoulu, TAMK), a polytechnic with about 10,000 students. The Police University College, the polytechnic institution serving all of Finland in its field of specialization, is also in Tampere.

Tampere University Hospital (Tampereen yliopistollinen sairaala, TAYS) in the Kauppi district, one of the main hospitals in Finland, is affiliated with Tampere University. It is a teaching hospital with 34 medical specializations.

The Nurmi district in the northern part of city also houses the Tampere Christian School (Tampereen kristillinen koulu), which operates on a co-Christian basis and is maintained by the Adventist Church of Finland, offering free basic education based on Christian basic values and outlook on life for all grades of primary school.

== Arts and culture ==
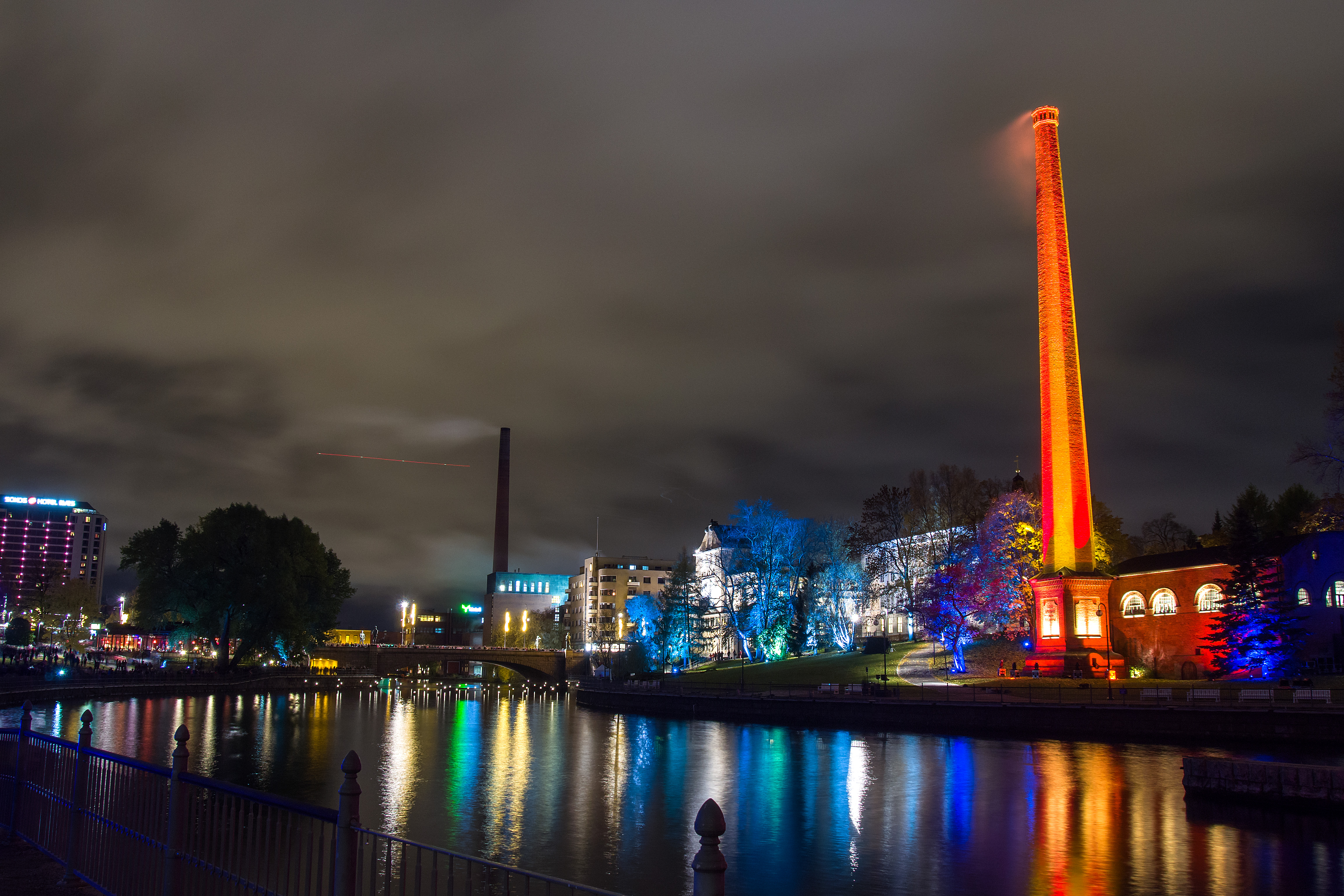
The Tammerkoski rapids in Tampere at night in 2015. The Festival of Light has just opened and an old, large factory chimney is lit in red on the right side of the rapids and contrasts with the blue lighting of the trees beneath it. The array of colours is reflected by the water of the rapids.

Tampere is known for its active cultural life. Some of Finland's most popular writers, such as Väinö Linna, Kalle Päätalo, and Hannu Salama, hail from Tampere. They are known particularly for depicting the lives of working-class people, thanks to their backgrounds as members of the working class. Also from such a background was the poet Lauri Viita of the Pispala district, which was also Salama's original home. On 1 October, Tampere celebrates Tampere Day (Finnish: Tampereen päivä), which hosts a variety of public events.

=== Media ===
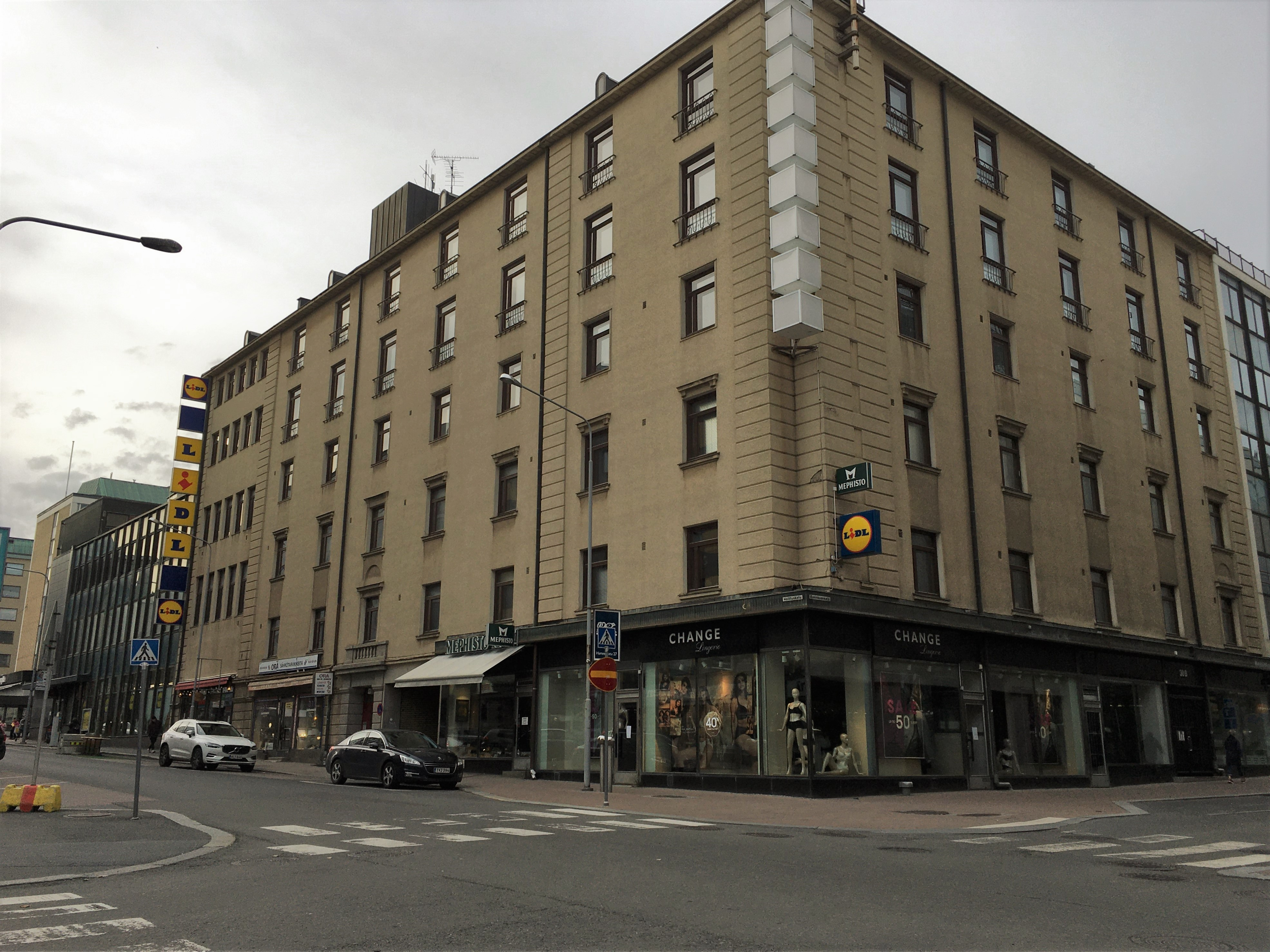
An office building of Aamulehti newspaper in the Nalkala district

Tampere is a strong media city. The television center in Tohloppi and Ristimäki districts has had a nationwide Yle TV2 television channel since the 1970s, and Finnish radio, for example, began in Tampere when Arvi Hauvonen founded the first broadcasting station in 1923. Yle TV2 has its roots in Tamvisio, which was transferred to Yleisradio (YLE, Finnish National Broadcasting Company) in 1964. Kakkoskanava ("Channel 2") has been a major influence in Tampere, and several well-known television programs and series have been shot in the city, such as TV comedies Tankki täyteen, Reinikainen and Kummeli. There's also a play park in central Tampere named after the channel's most famous children's programme, Pikku Kakkonen.

Today, Yle operates as a tenant in its old premises, which in 2013 was transformed into a hub for visual media production companies and training institutes called Mediapolis.

The Ruutu+ streaming service's popular crime drama television series Lakeside Murders (Finnish: Koskinen), based on the Koskinen book series by Seppo Jokinen, is also produced and filmed in Tampere.

The Tampere Film Festival, an annual international short film event, is held every March. Tampere has also served as a filming location for international film productions, most notably the 1993 British comedy film The Big Freeze and the 2022 American sci-fi film Dual.

In 2014, Aamulehti, which was published in Tampere and was founded in 1881, was the third largest newspaper in Finland in terms of circulation, after Helsingin Sanomat and Ilta-Sanomat. The circulation of the magazine was 98 408 (2016). In addition, a free city newspaper Tamperelainen (literally translated "Tamperean", meaning person who live in Tampere) will be published in the city. In November 2016, the Tamperelainen was awarded the second best city newspaper in Finland.

The city is also known as the home of the popular Hydraulic Press Channel on YouTube, which originates from a machine shop owned by Lauri Vuohensilta.

Independent video game developer Colossal Order, known for the hit city-building game Cities: Skylines, is based in Tampere. Cities: Skylines II also features the city's geography as an in-game map for those who pre-ordered the game. Iceflake Studios, the studio working on Cities: Skylines II since 2026, is also headquartered in Tampere.

=== Food ===
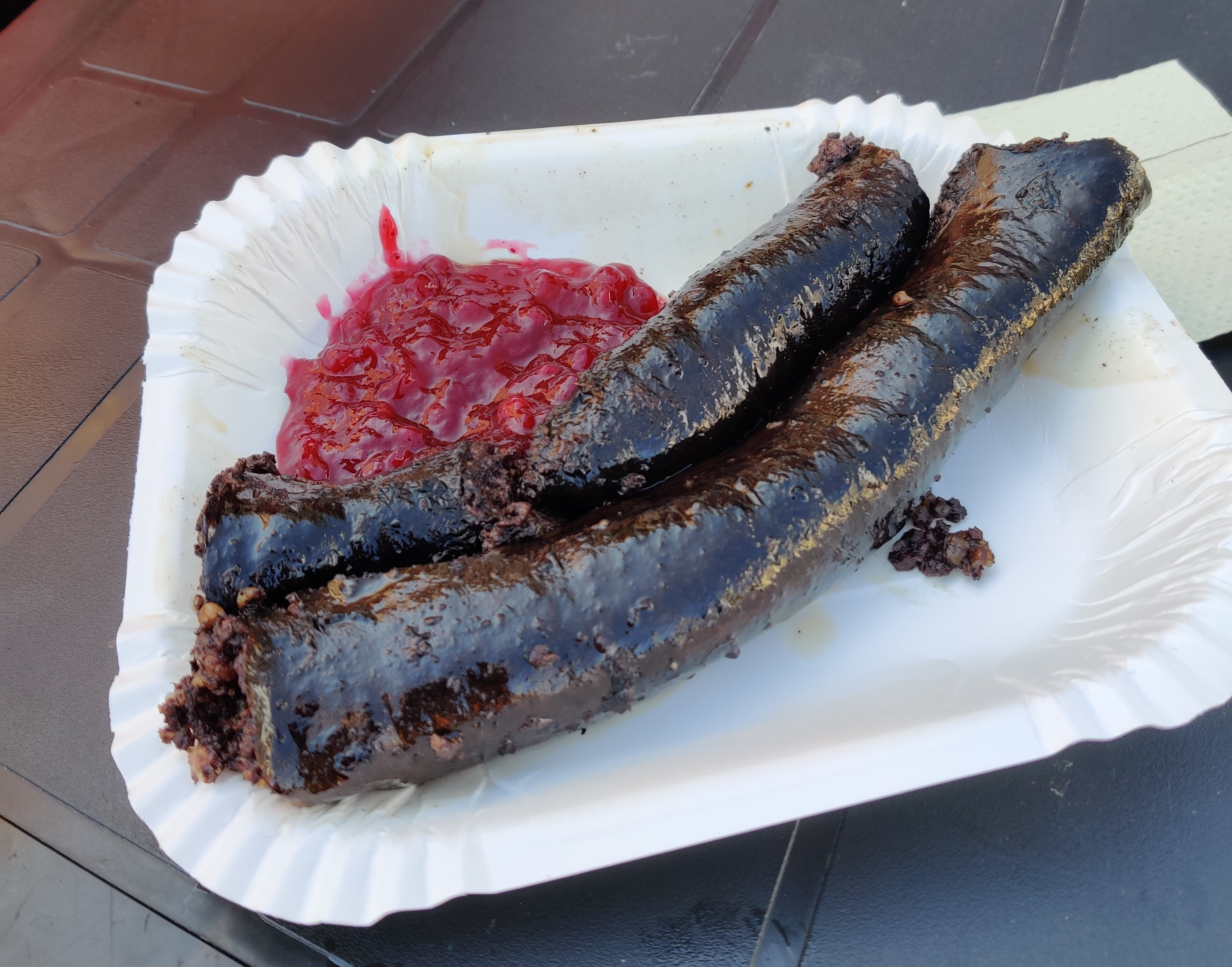
Mustamakkara ("black sausage"), a speciality food from Tampere, is typically consumed with lingonberry jam.

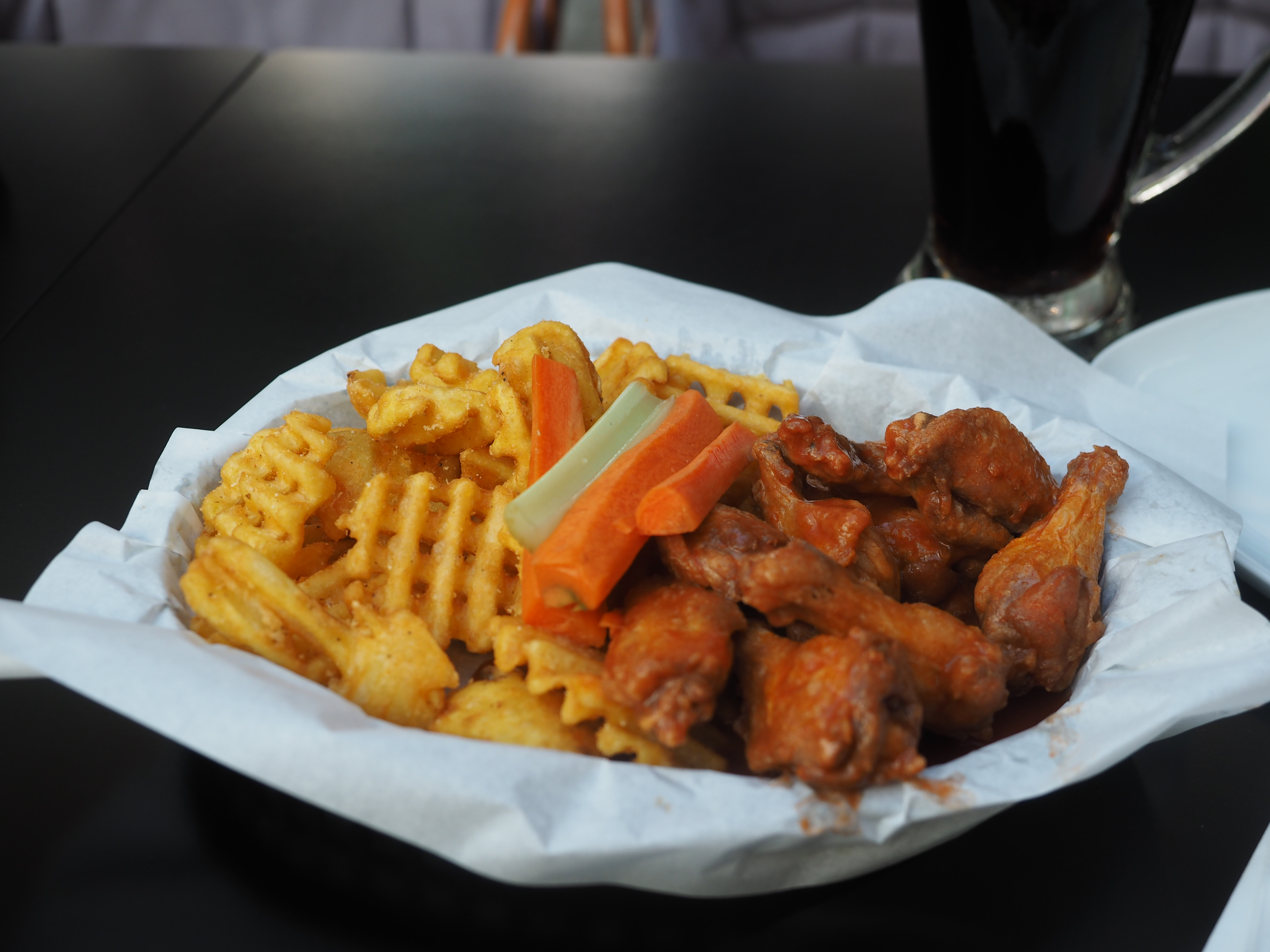
Tampere claims to be the "wings capital of Finland", consuming almost half of the hot wings in Finland. The restaurant chain Siipiweikot originates from Tampere. Almost half of the chicken wings sold in Finland are eaten exclusively in Pirkanmaa.

A local food speciality is mustamakkara, which resembles the black pudding of northern England and blood sausages around Europe. It is a black sausage made by mixing pork, pig's blood and crushed rye and flour and is stuffed into the intestines of an animal. It is commonly eaten with lingonberry sauce. Especially Tammelantori square in the district of Tammela is known for its mustamakkara kiosks, as well as Laukontori in center.

A newer Tampere tradition are munkki, fresh sugary doughnuts that are sold in several cafés around Tampere, but most traditionally in Pyynikki observation tower.

One of the specialties of Tampere's local barbecue dishes include the peremech (pärämäts in Finnish), based on traditional Tatar food. It is a pie reminiscent of Karelian pasty with seasoned ground meat inside.

In the 1980s, in addition to mustamakkara and barley bread, the old parish dish of Tampere was also called a potato soup, home-made small beer (kotikalja), a sweetened lingonberry porridge and a sweetened potato casserole (Imelletty perunalaatikko).

Since 1991, the two-day fish market event (Tampereen kalamarkkinat) in Laukontori attracts as many as 80,000–100,000 visitors in year, and is held both in the spring on vappu and in the autumn on Tampere Day.

=== Music ===
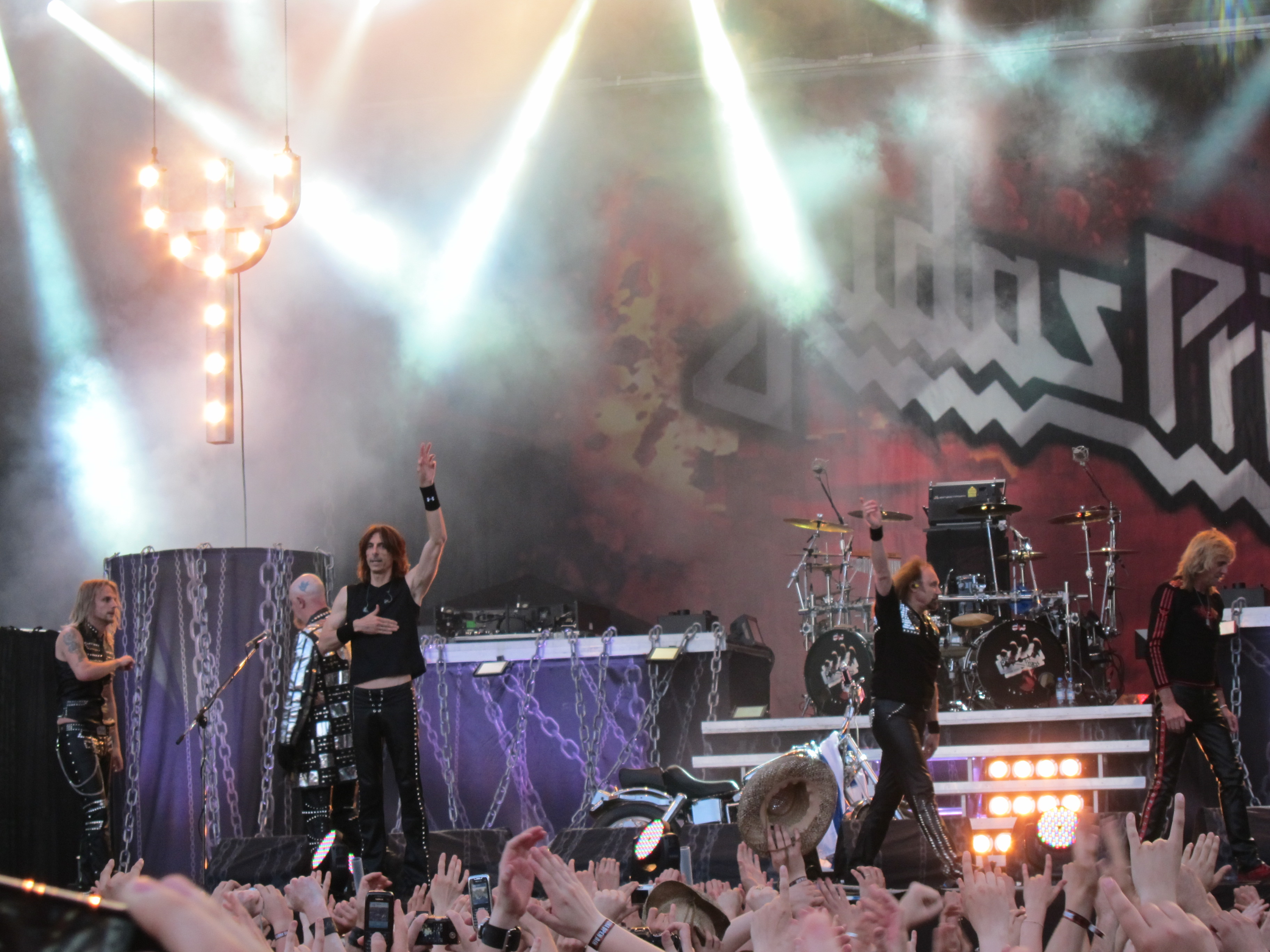
Judas Priest performing as one of the headliners at the 2011 Sauna Open Air Metal Festival

Tampere is home to the Tampere Philharmonic Orchestra (Tampere Filharmonia), one of only two full-sized symphony orchestras in Finland; the other is in Helsinki. The orchestra's home venue is the Tampere Hall, and its concerts include classical, popular, and film music. Tampere Music Festivals organises three international music events: The Tampere Jazz Happening each November, and in alternate years The Tampere Vocal Music Festival and the Tampere Biennale. Professional education in many fields of classical music, including performing arts, pedagogic arts, and composition, is provided by Tampere University of Applied Sciences and Tampere Conservatoire.

Manserock became a general term for rock music from Tampere, which was essentially rock music with Finnish lyrics. Manserock was especially popular during the 1970s and 1980s, and its most popular artists include Juice Leskinen, Veltto Virtanen, Kaseva, Popeda, and Eppu Normaali. In 1977, Poko Rekords, the first record company in Tampere, was founded.

In the 2010s, there has been a lot of popular musical activity in Tampere, particularly in the fields of rock and heavy/black metal; one of the most important metal music events in Tampere is the Sauna Open Air Metal Festival. Some of the most popular bands based in Tampere include Negative, Uniklubi, and Lovex. Tampere also has an active electronic music scene. Tampere hosts an annual World of Tango Festival (Maailmantango), which is one of the most significant tango events in Finland next to the Tangomarkkinat of Seinäjoki.

=== Theatre ===
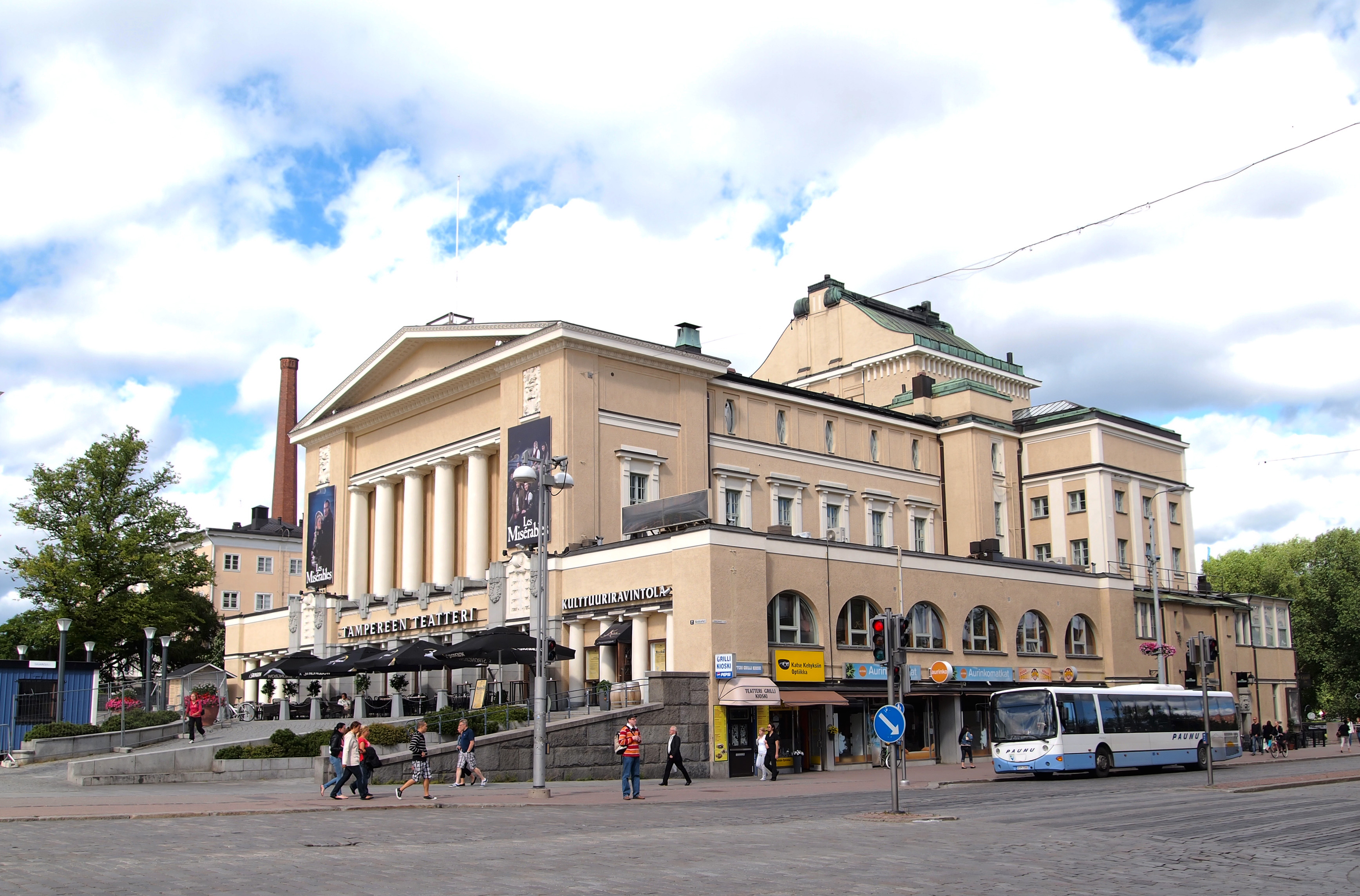
The Tampere Theatre (Finnish: Tampereen Teatteri)

Tampere has a lengthy tradition of theater, with established institutions such as Tampereen Työväen Teatteri, Tampereen Teatteri, and Pyynikin Kesäteatteri, which is an open-air theatre with the oldest revolving auditorium in Europe. The longest-running directors of the Tampereen Teatteri include Heikki Vihinen and Rauli Lehtonen, and the Tampereen Työväen Teatteri had Kosti Elo, Eino Salmelainen and Esko Roine. The Tampere Theatre Festival (Tampereen teatterikesä) is an international theatre festival held in the city each August. Tampere also has the Tampere Opera, founded in 1946.

Tampere's other professional theaters are Teatteri Siperia; restaurant theater Teatteripalatsi; Teatteri Telakka, known for its artistic experiments; Ahaa Teatteri, which specializes in children's and young people's plays; puppet theater Teatteri Mukamas, and Tanssiteatteri MD, specializes in contemporary dance performances. In addition, there are also three cinemas in Tampere: two Finnkino's theaters, Cine Atlas and Plevna, and private Arthouse Cinema Niagara, which serves as the main venue for the Cinemadrome Festival, which presents horror, action, sci-fi, trash, and other cult films. Local cinemas also included the historic Imatra, formerly located in the Kyttälä district, which was completely destroyed on a fire in the midst of a 1924 film Wages of Virtue on 23 October 1927, killing 21 people.

=== Religious activities ===
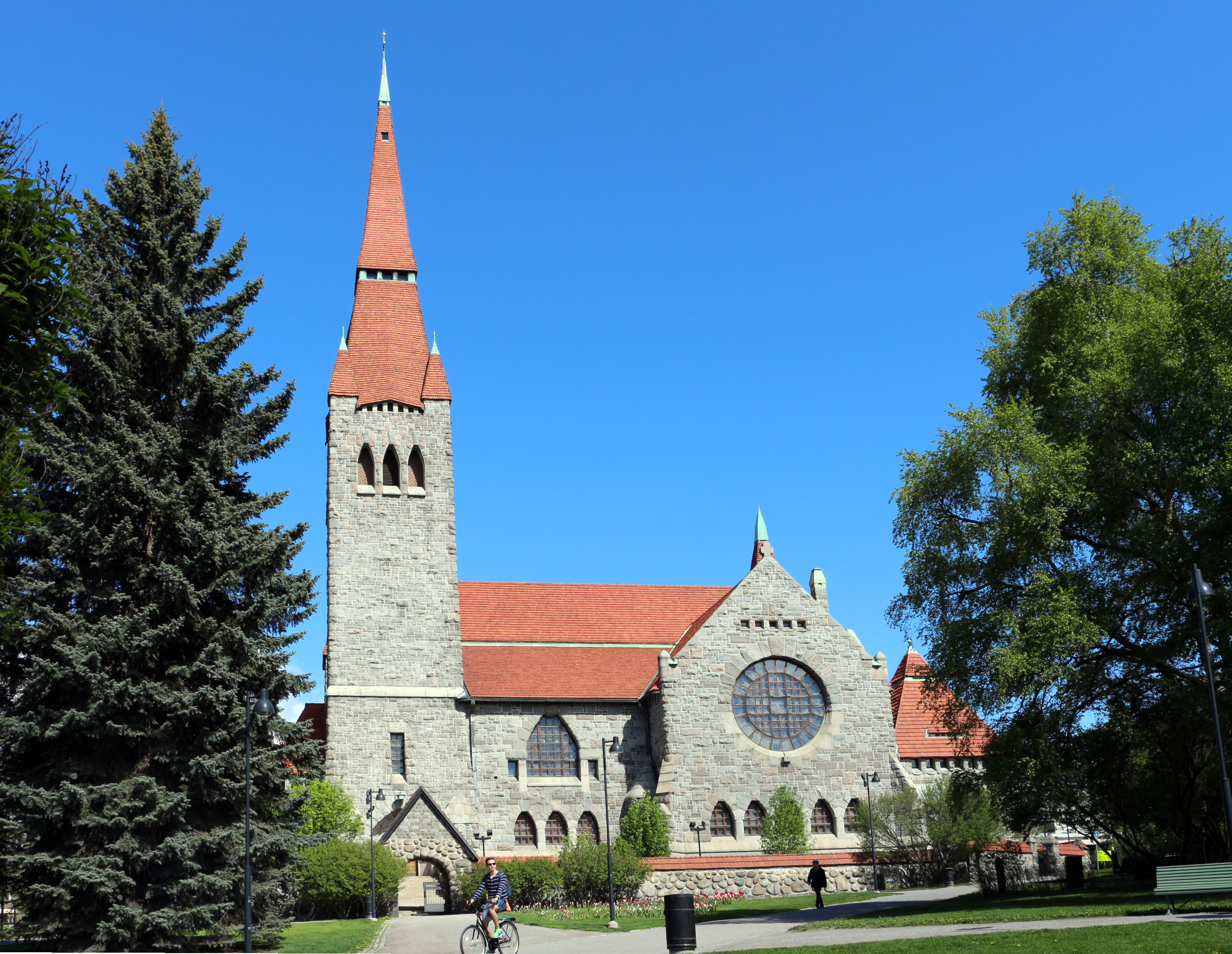
Cathedral of Tampere in the Jussinkylä district, designed by Finnish architect Lars Sonck

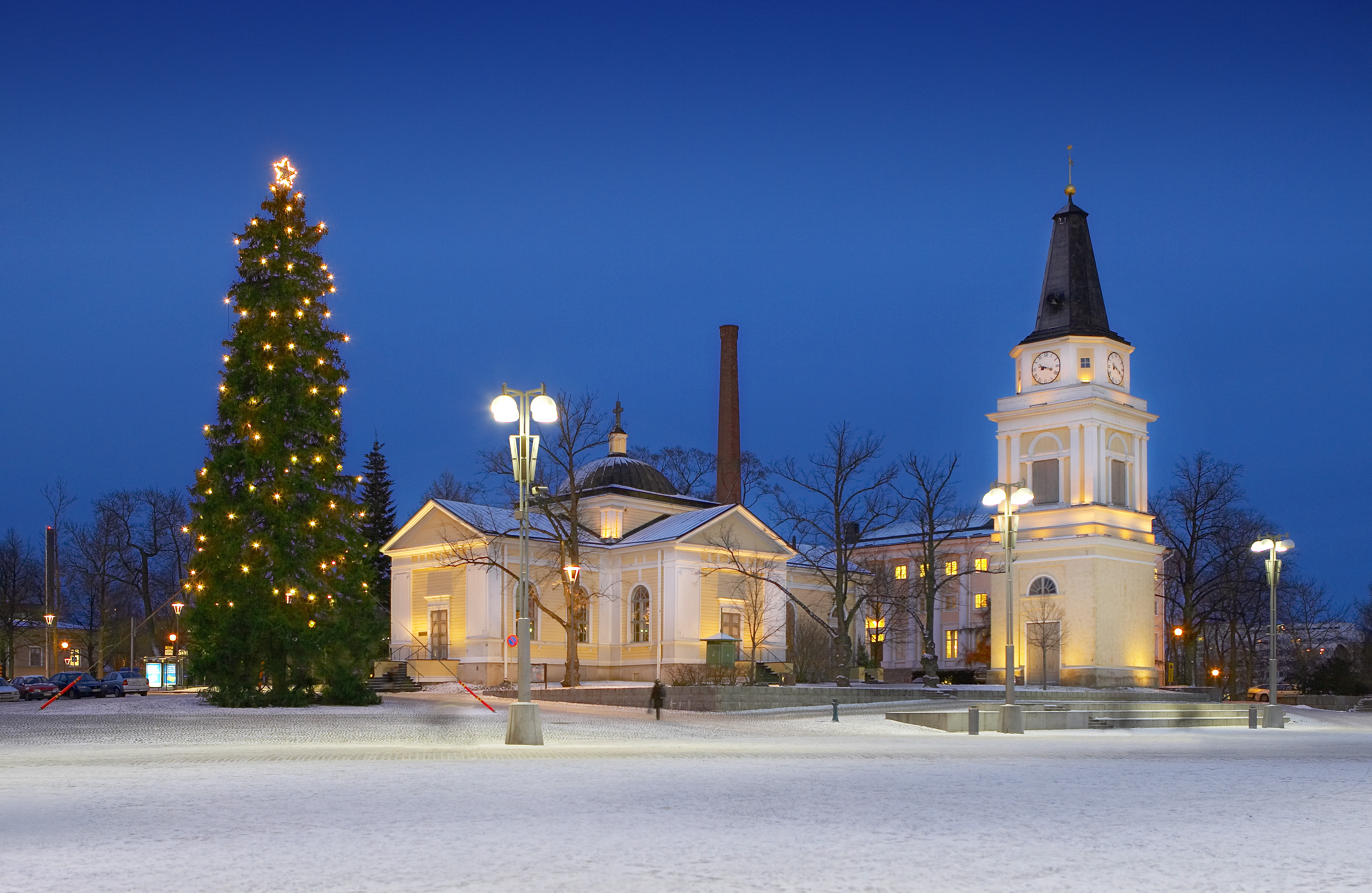
The Old Church (Vanha kirkko) on the edge of the Tampere Central Square

As in most of Finland, most Tampere citizens belong to the Evangelical Lutheran Church of Finland. One Lutheran church in Tampere is Finlayson Church in the district by the same name. Tampere also has a variety of other religious services spanning from traditional to charismatic. There are also some English speaking services, such as the Tampere English Service, an international community affiliated with the Tampere Pentecostal Church (Tampereen helluntaiseurakunta). English services of the International Congregation of Christ the King (ICCK) are organized by the Anglican Church in Finland and the Lutheran Parishes of Tampere. The Catholic parish of the Holy Cross also offers services in Finnish, Polish and English. Other churches may also have English speaking ministries. Tampere is the center of a LDS stake (diocese). Other churches in Tampere are the Baptist Church, the Evangelical Free Church, the Evangelical Lutheran Mission Diocese of Finland, the Finnish Orthodox Church and the Nokia Revival.

There was an organized Jewish community until 1981. Though a few Jews remain in Tampere, organized communal life ended at that time.

There are three registered Muslim communities in Tampere. The biggest is Tampere Islam Society, with over 1500 members.

=== City rivalry with Turku ===
Tampere ostensibly has a long-standing mutual feud with the city of Turku, the first capital of Finland, and they tend to compete for the title of being the "second grand city of Finland" after Helsinki. This rivalry is largely expressed in jokes in one city about the other; prominent targets are the traditional Tampere food, mustamakkara, the state of the Aura River in Turku, and the regional accents. Tampere is well known as a food destination because of its food culture. Since 1997, students at Tampere have made annual excursions to Turku to jump on the market square, doing their part to undo the post-glacial rebound and push the city back into the Baltic Sea.

== Main sights ==
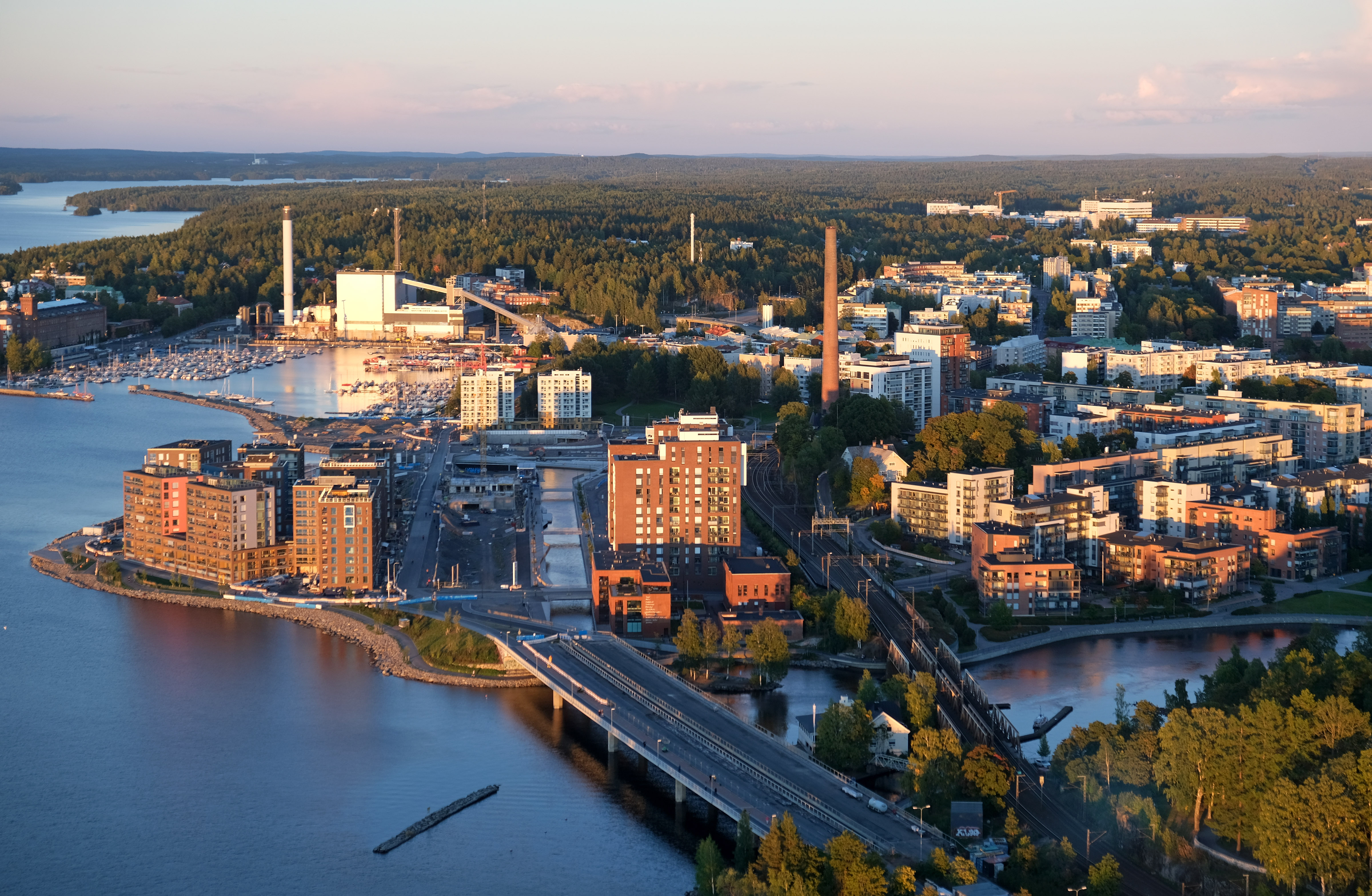
Tammerkoski and Näsijärvi seen from Näsinneula

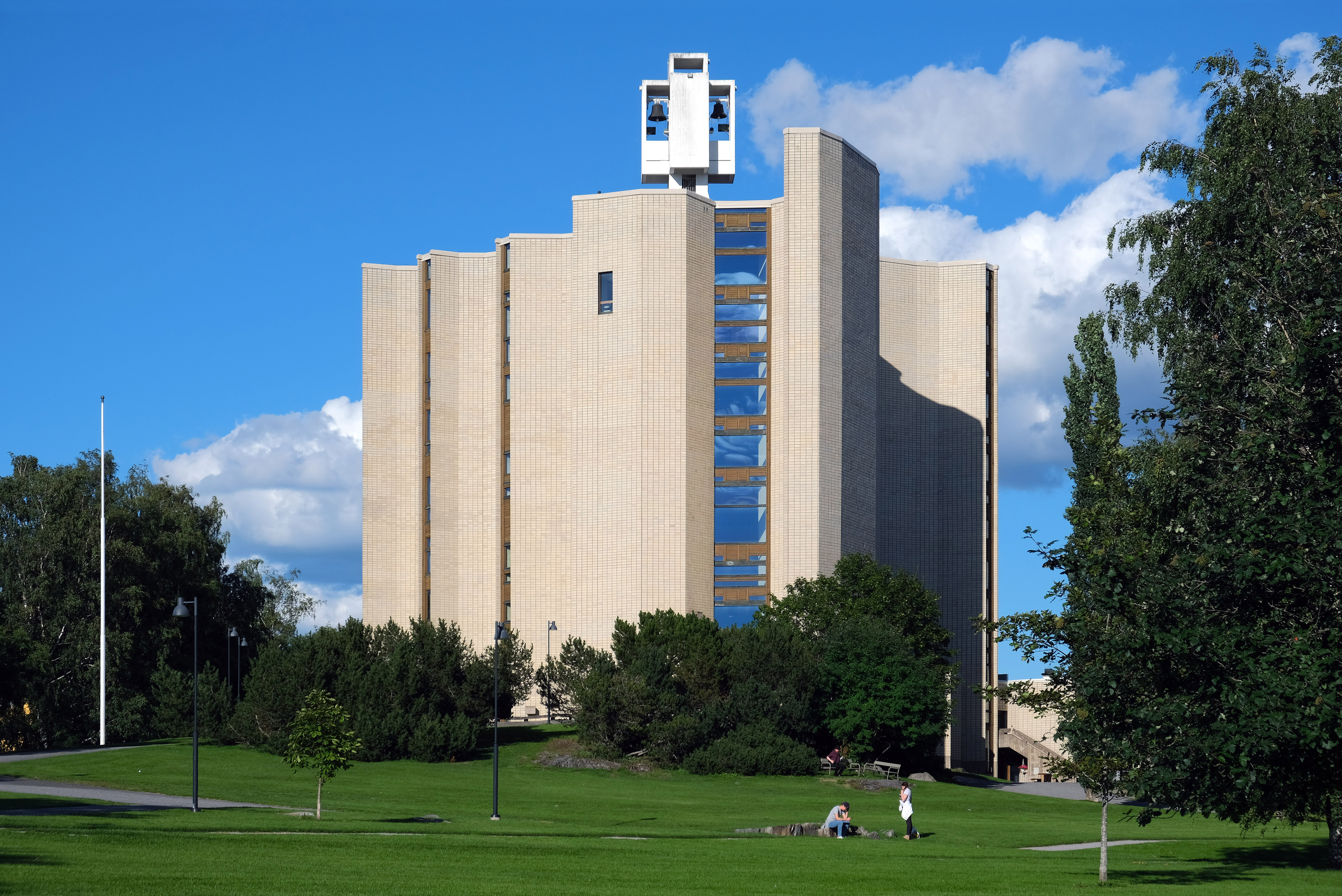
The Kaleva Church, designed by Reima and Raili Pietilä, in Liisankallio

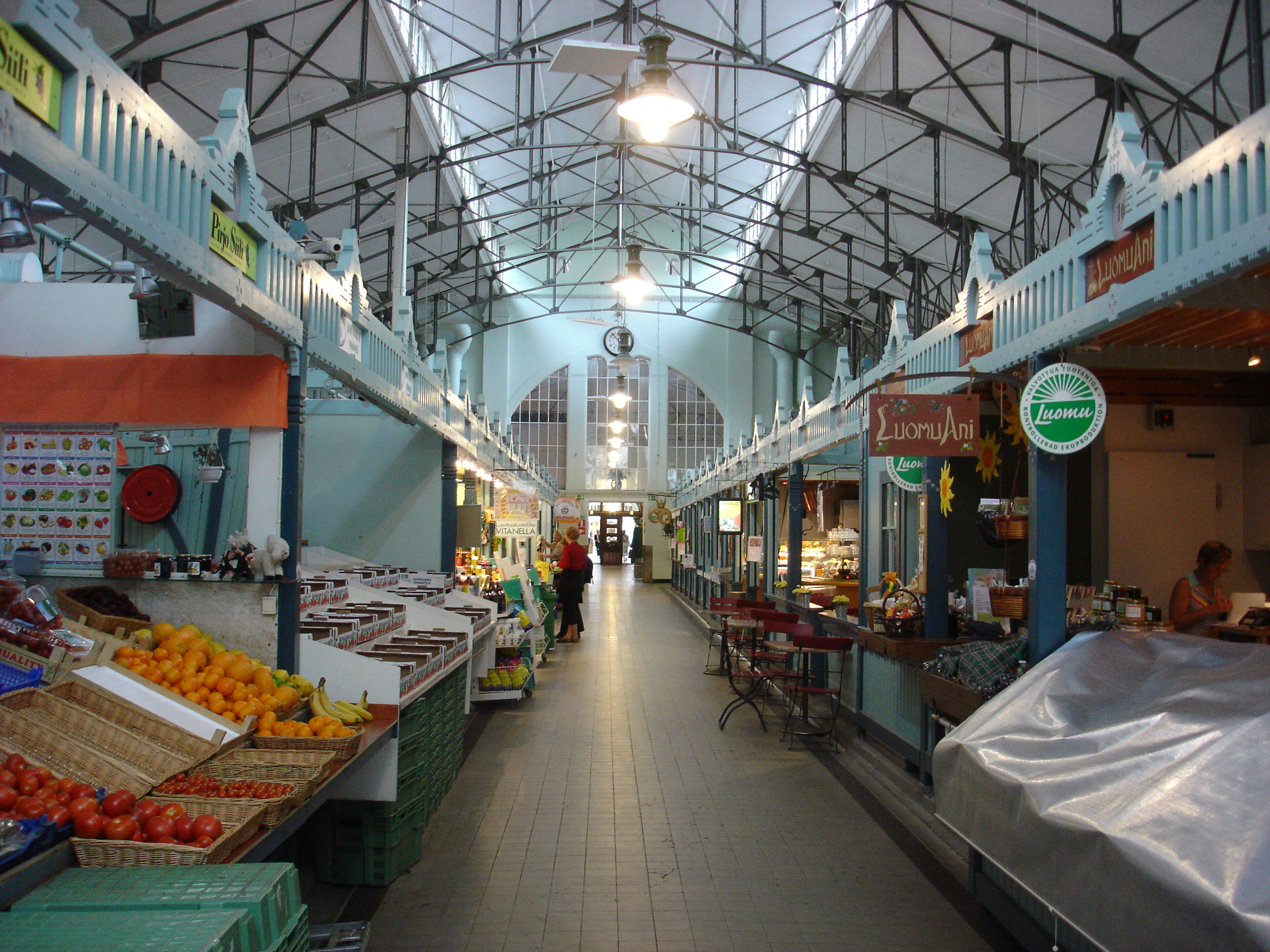
Interior of the Tampere Market Hall

One of the main tourist attractions is the Särkänniemi amusement park, which includes the landmark Näsinneula tower, topped by a revolving restaurant. In addition to these, it used to house an aquarium. Other sites of interest are Tampere Cathedral, Tampere City Hall, Tampere Central Library Metso ("Capercaillie"), Kaleva Church (both designed by Reima Pietilä), the Tampere Hall for conferences and concerts, the Tampere Market Hall (along Hämeenkatu) and historical Pyynikki observation tower.

Tampere has at least seven hotels, the most noteworthy of which are Hotel Tammer, Hotel Ilves, and Hotel Torni, the tallest hotel building in Finland. The Holiday Club Tampere spa is also located in the Lapinniemi district on the shores of Lake Näsijärvi. There are also many significant shopping centers in the city center of Tampere and its suburbs; the most notable shopping centers are Ratina, Koskikeskus, DUO, Like, and Tullintori.

Tampere is also home to one of the last museums in the world dedicated to Vladimir Lenin. The museum is housed in the Tampere Workers' Hall (along Hallituskatu) where during a subsequent Bolshevik conference in the city, Lenin met Joseph Stalin for the first time. Lenin moved to Tampere in August 1905, but eventually fled for Sweden in November 1907 when being pursued by the Russian Okhrana. Lenin did not return to any part of the Russian Empire until ten years later, when he heard of the start of the Russian Revolution of 1917. Tampere Lenin-museum closed on 3 November 2024 and reopened under the name Nootti (Note) in February 2025.

There are many museums and galleries, including:

- The Vapriikki Museum Centre which includes the Natural History Museum of Tampere, Finnish Hockey Hall of Fame, Finnish Museum of Games, Post Museum and the Shoe Museum
- Hatanpää Manor and Hatanpää Arboretum
- The Näsilinna Palace
- Tampere Art Museum
- Tampere Lenin Museum
- The Moomin Museum, about Moomins
- Rupriikki Media Museum
- Spy Museum in Siperia
- Workers' housing museum in Amuri.
- Finland's largest glass sculpture, owned by the City of Tampere, "Pack Ice / The Mirror of the Sea" by the artist Timo Sarpaneva, was installed in the entrance lobby of the downtown shopping mall KoskiKeskus until it was moved to a warehouse.

=== Pispala ===
Pispala is a ridge between the two lakes. It is divided into Ylä-Pispala ("Upper Pispala") and Ala-Pispala ("Lower Pispala"). It's the highest gravel ridge in the world, raising 80 m (260 ft) above Lake Pyhäjärvi and around 160 m (520 ft) above sea level. It housed the majority of industrial labour in the late 19th and early 20th century, when it was part of Suur-Pirkkala and its successor Pohjois-Pirkkala. It was a free area to be built upon by the working-class people working in Tampere factories. It joined Tampere in 1937. It is now a residential area undergoing significant redevelopment and together with neighbouring Pyynikki forms an important historical area of Tampere.

== Events ==
=== Concerts ===
Ratina Stadium of Tampere, in the district by the same name, has served as the venue for many of the most significant concerts, most notably in connection with the Endless Forms Most Beautiful World Tour in 2015 by the band Nightwish. Other noteworthy tours from other bands held at Ratina Stadium include Iron Maiden (Somewhere Back in Time World Tour, 2008), Bruce Springsteen (Working on a Dream Tour, 2009), AC/DC (Black Ice World Tour, 2010), Red Hot Chili Peppers (I'm with You World Tour, 2012), Bon Jovi (Because We Can World Tour, 2013), Robbie Williams (The Heavy Entertainment Show Tour, 2017) and Rammstein (Rammstein Stadium Tour, 2019).

Tammerfest, Tampere's urban rock festival, is held every July. The Blockfest, which also takes place in Tampere in the summer, is the largest hip hop event in the Nordic countries.

== Sport ==
=== Ice hockey ===
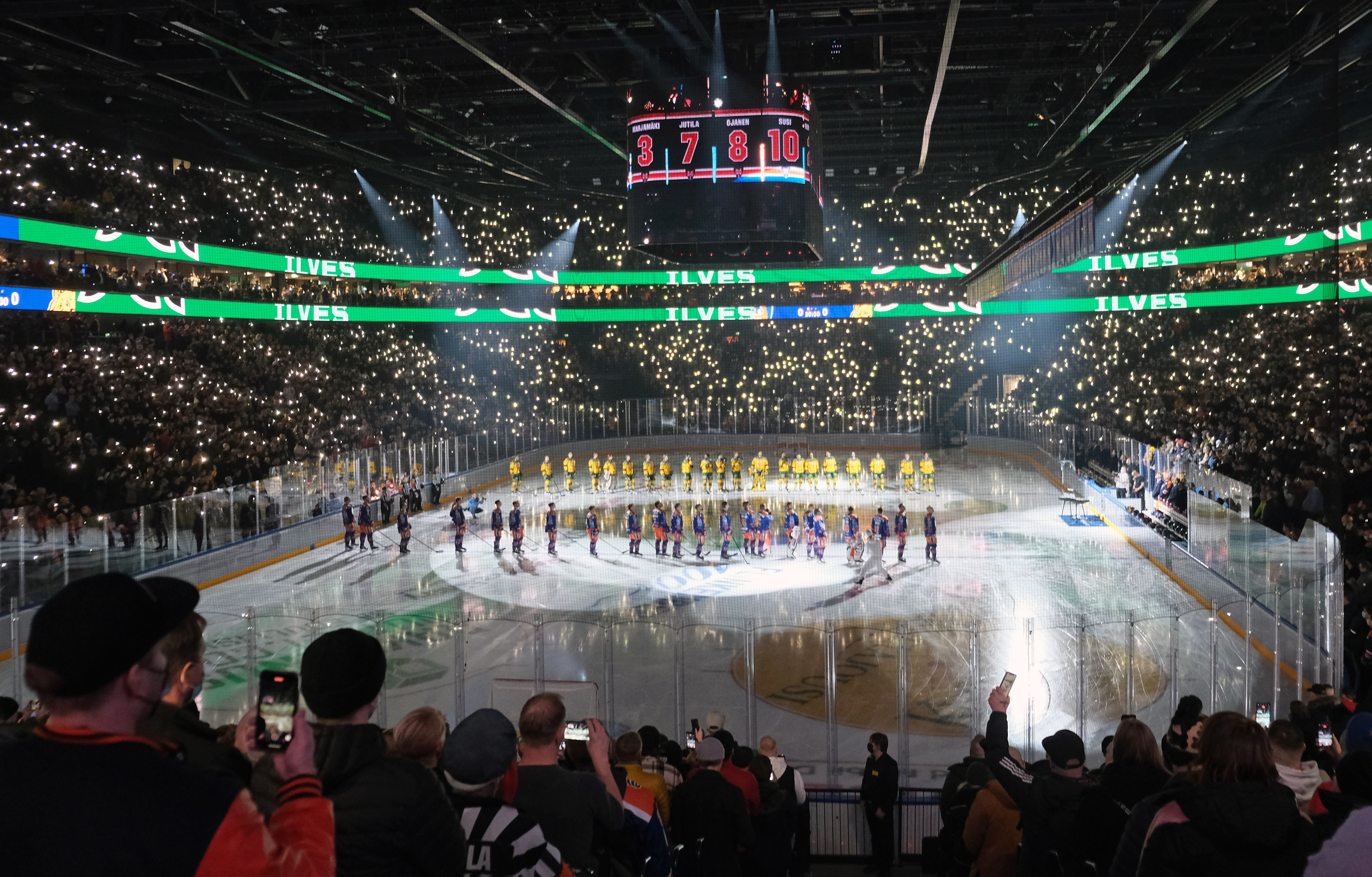
Opening game of Nokia Arena: Tappara vs Ilves

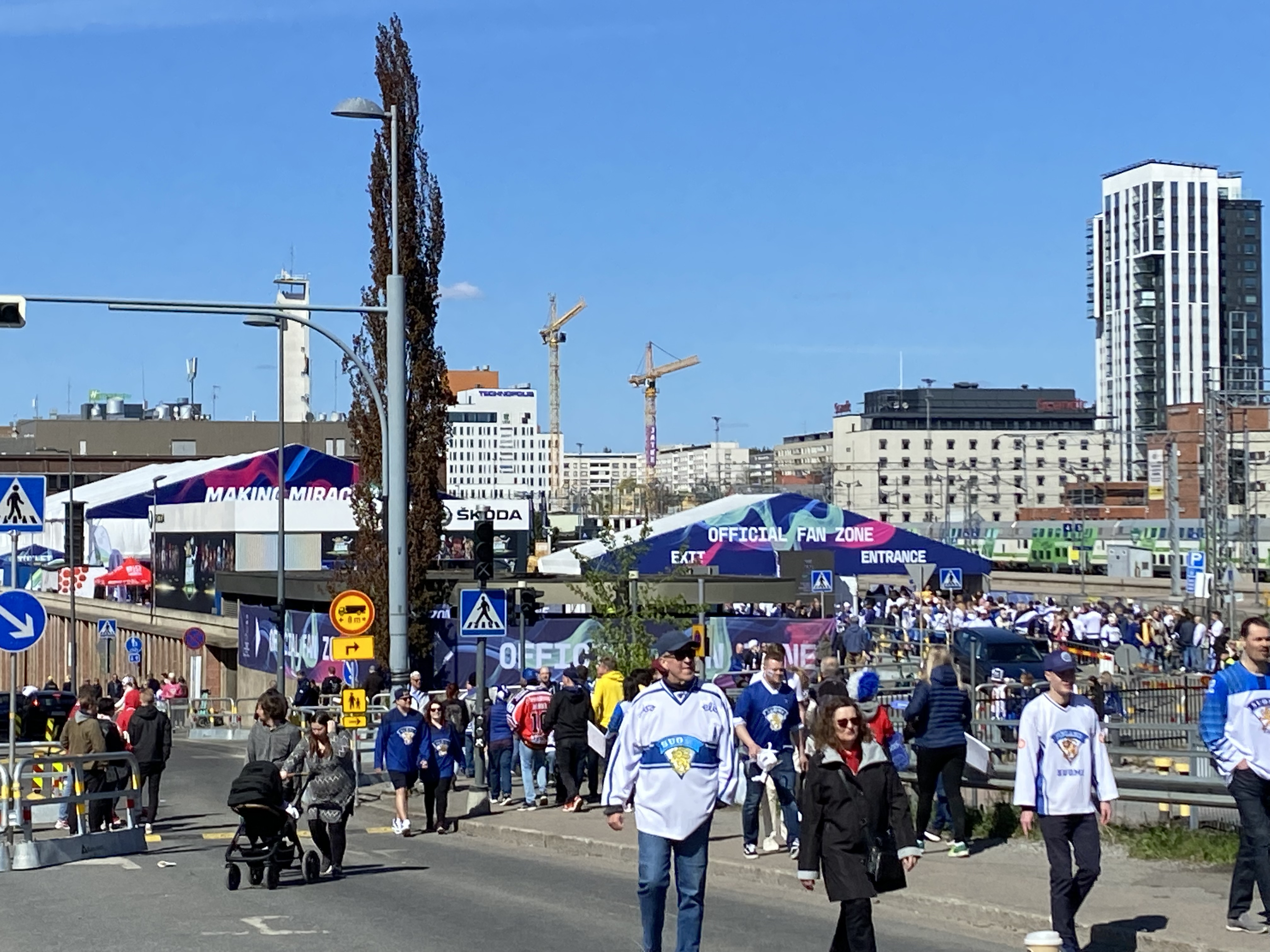
Official Fan Zone in Tampere during the 2022 IIHF World Championship

Tampere's sporting scene is mainly driven by ice hockey. The first Finnish ice hockey match was played in Tampere, on the ice of Pyhäjärvi. Tampere is nicknamed the hometown of Finnish ice hockey. Three exceptional ice hockey teams come from Tampere: Tappara, Ilves and Koovee. Especially both Tappara and Ilves have had a great impact on Finnish ice hockey culture and are among the most successful teams in Finland; of these, Ilves was the first Tampere-based hockey team to win the 1935-1936 Finnish championship. The Finnish ice hockey museum, and the first ice hockey arena to be built in Finland, the Hakametsä arena, are both located in Tampere. Construction of a new main ice hockey arena, Tampere Deck Arena, began in 2018, and was first opened to the public on 3 December 2021, although the official opening date was on 15 December. The name of the new arena was supposed to be UROS LIVE, but due to the financial difficulties of the sponsor behind it, the name was abandoned. After that, Nokia Corporation was chosen as the new sponsor on 19 November 2021, and the arena was renamed Nokia Arena. The arena served as one of the host cities for the 2022 IIHF World Championship and the 2023 IIHF World Championship.

=== Football ===
Like ice hockey, football is also a popular sport in Tampere. Ilves, the professional football club of Tampere, alone has over 4,000 players in its football teams, while Tampere boasts over 100 (mostly junior) football teams.

Tampere hosted some of the football preliminaries for the 1952 Summer Olympics.

=== Basketball ===
Basketball is another popular sport in Tampere; the city has three basketball teams with big junior activity and one of them, Tampereen Pyrintö, plays on the highest level (Korisliiga) both with men's and women's team. Men's team was the Finnish Champion in 2010, 2011, and 2014.

Tampere was a co-host of the EuroBasket 1967, and the Nokia Arena hosted EuroBasket 2025 as one of the host cities.

=== Batting sports ===
Manse PP is the city's pesäpallo team, the only remaining team in the men's Superpesis to be based within a major city, and who won the league in 2021, as well as the women's league in 2017.

Tampere also has a baseball and softball club, the Tampere Tigers, which plays in the top division of Finnish baseball.

=== American football ===
Tampere Saints is the American football club in the city, that won division 2 in 2015 and plays in the Maple League (division 1) in summer 2017.

=== Speedway ===
Motorcycle speedway has been held in Tampere at several venues. The Eteläpuisto beach embankment hosted speedway from 1953 to 1988 and was an important venue for competitions, hosting the Nordic Final as part of the qualifying for the Speedway World Championship and the Scandinavian round of the Speedway World Team Cup. In addition, it hosted the final of the Finnish Individual Speedway Championship. When it closed the speedway moved to the Kaanaa track, out of the city to the village of Velaatta by Teisko Airfield. More recently the Ratina Stadium held various speedway meetings from 1995 to 2015, including the Speedway Grand Prix of Finland in 2014 and 2015.

=== Gymnastics ===
Tampere has long tradition in various fields of gymnastics. Finnish Gymnastics Federation office is located in Kauppi Sports Centre. Local clubs include Tampereen Voimistelijat, Elixiria Sport, Rantaperkiön Isku, TTNV. Ikuri Gymnastics centre is the main training location. Large competitions are organized in Tampere Fair Centre. Gymnaestrada Finland was held in Tampere in 2022.

=== Other sports ===
In addition to all of the above, volleyball, wrestling and boxing are also among Tampere's best-known sports.

The city also hosted two canoe sprint world championships, in 1973 and 1983. In 1977, Tampere hosted the World Rowing Junior Championships and in 1995 the Senior World Rowing Championships. Recently, Tampere was the host of the 10th European Youth Olympic Festival on 17–25 July 2009 and the 2010 World Ringette Championships on 1–6 November at Hakametsä arena.

Tampere hosted the 2023 European Masters Games from 26 June to 9 July.

== Transport ==
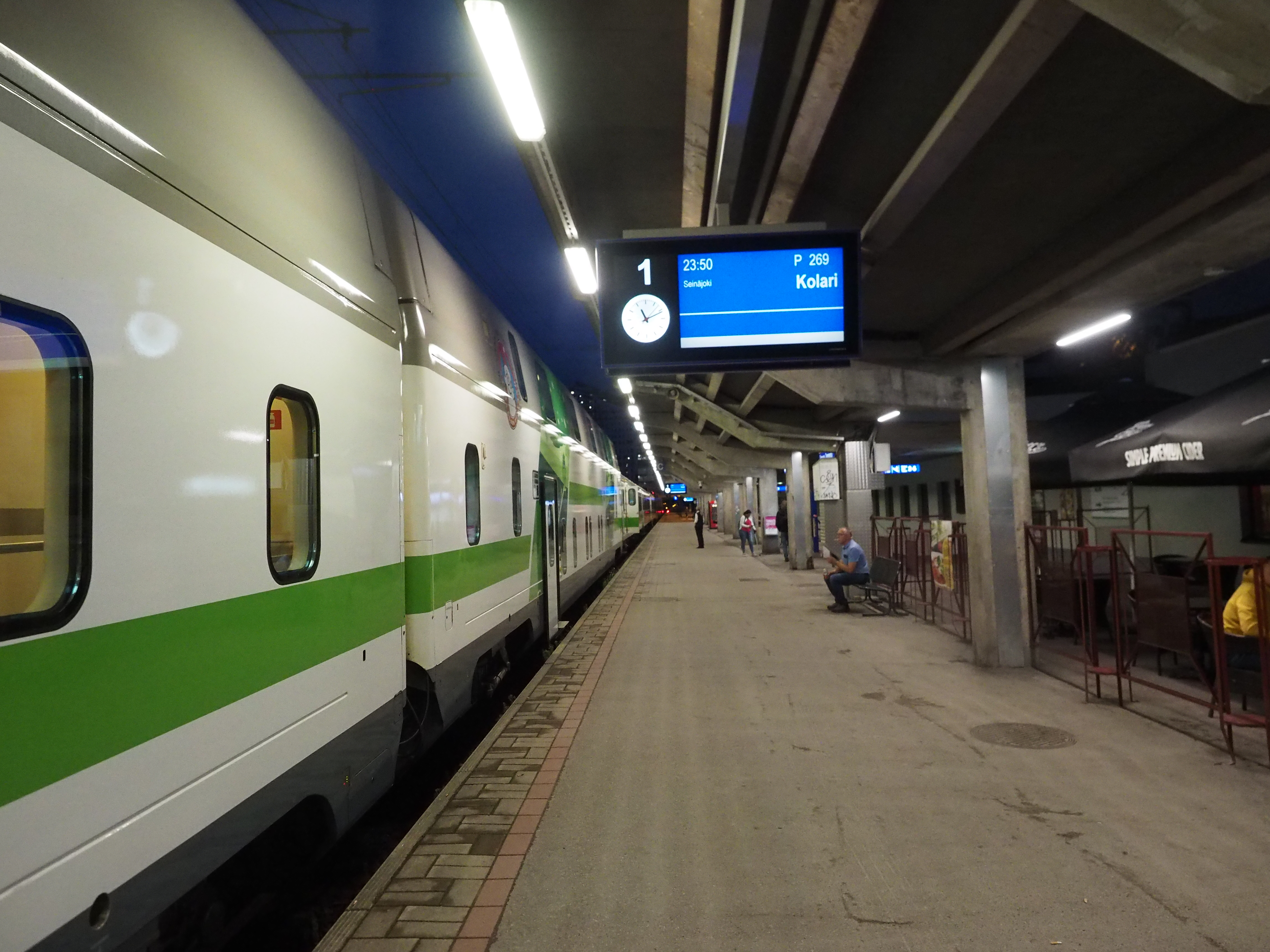
Train from Helsinki to Kolari stopping at Tampere

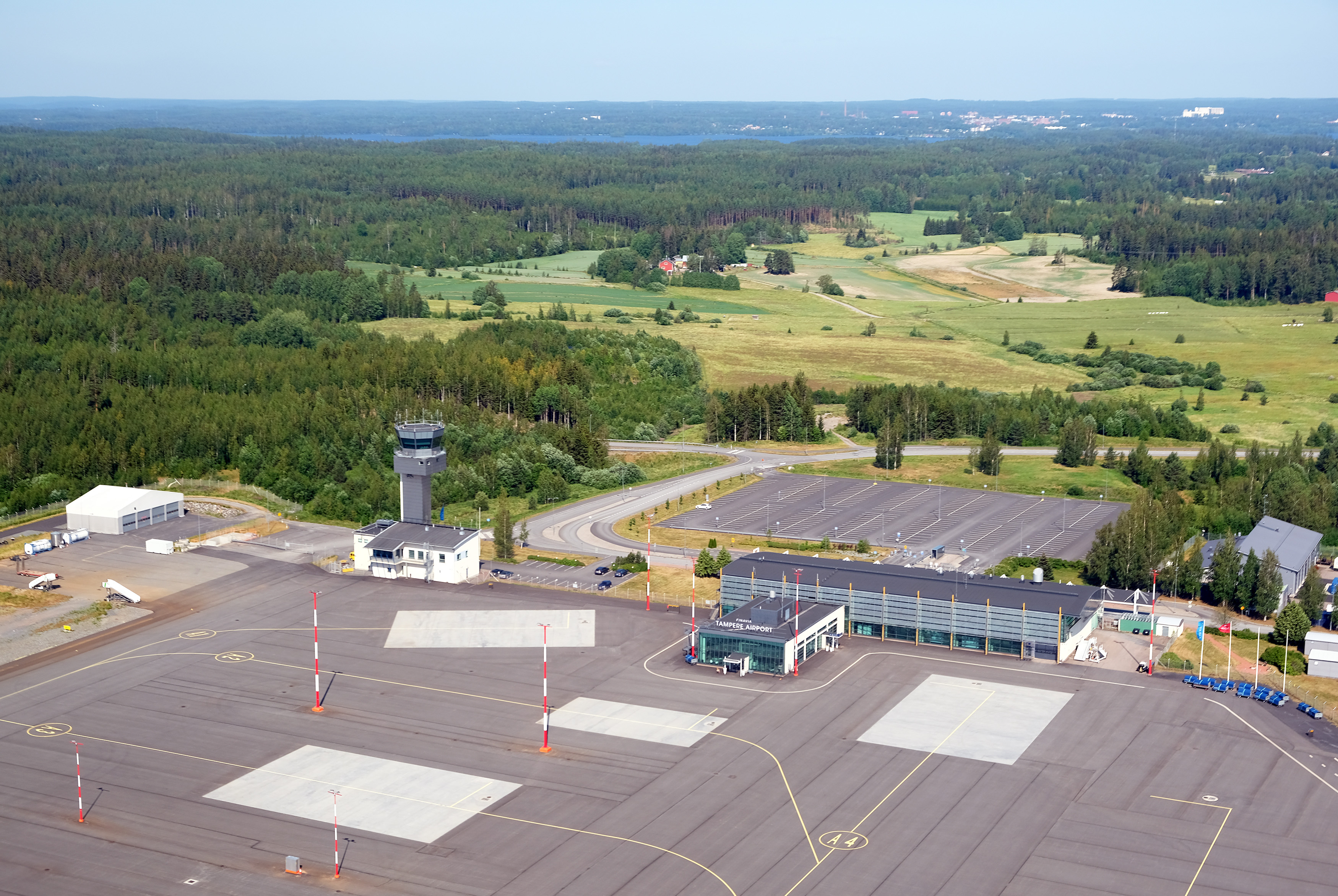
Tampere–Pirkkala Airport. This photo was taken during COVID-19 pandemic, when the airport was nearly empty.

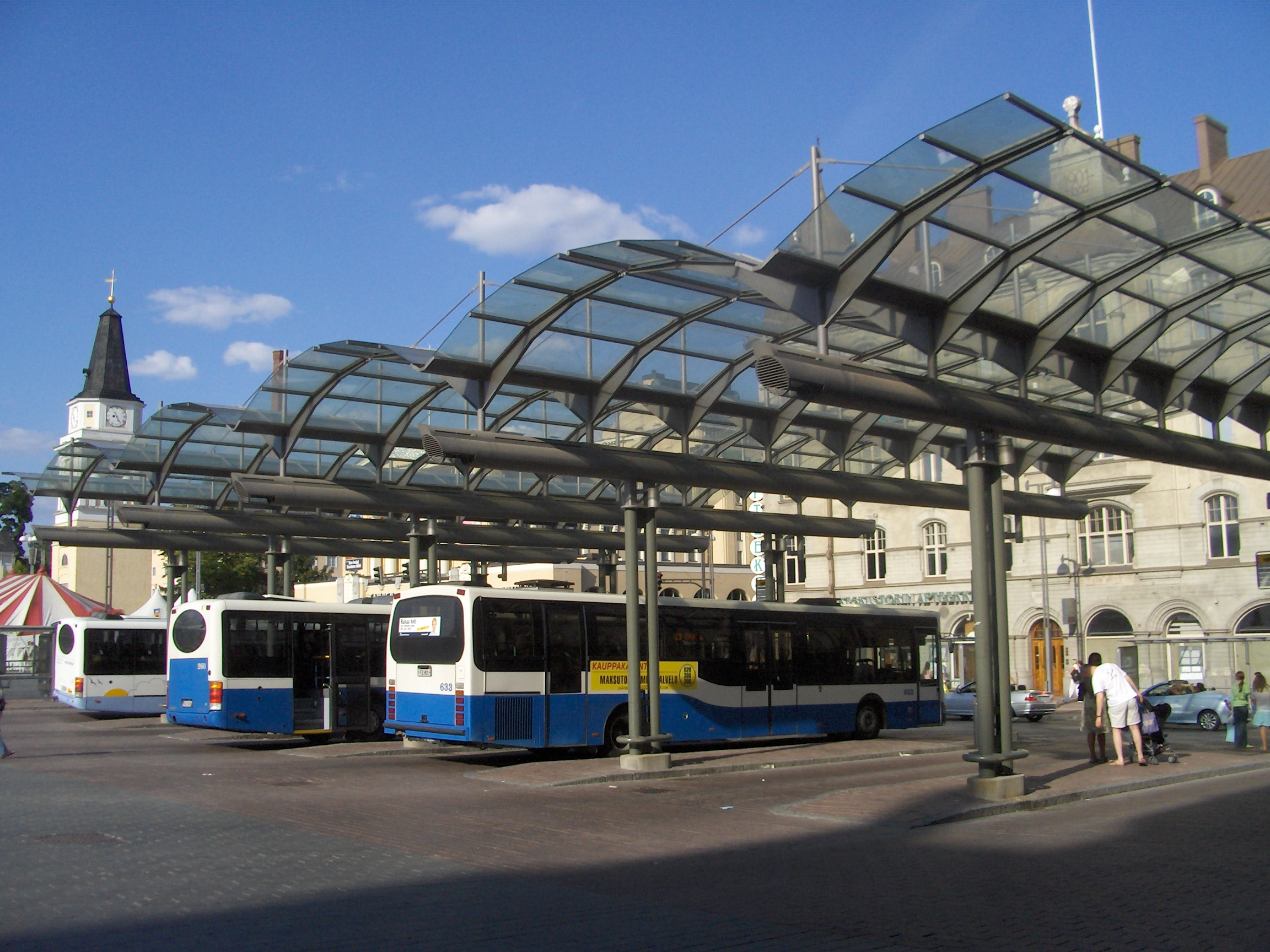
Bus terminals at the Tampere Central Square (Finnish: Keskustori)

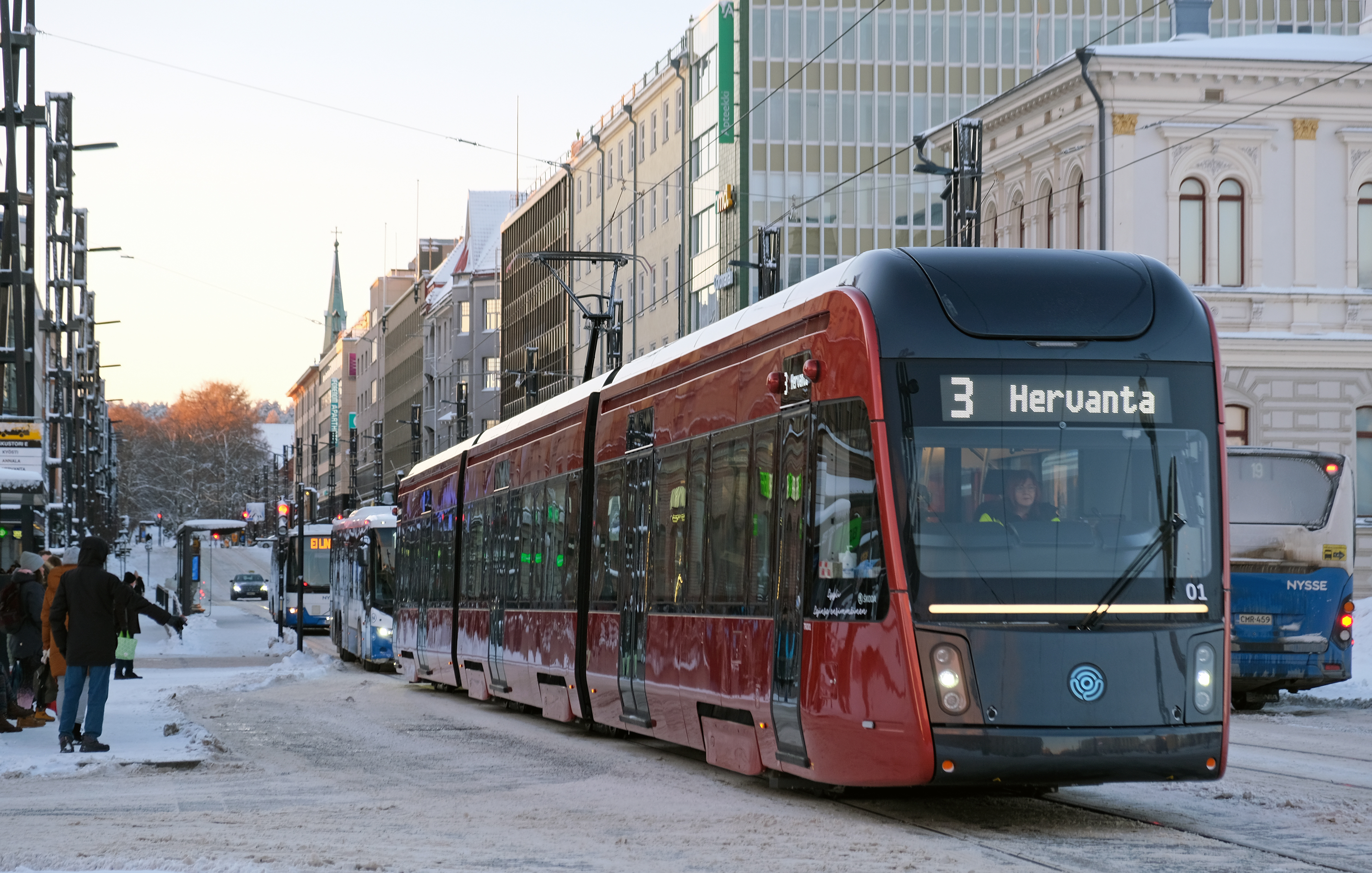
Tram in Hämeenkatu, Tampere

=== Roads ===
To the south of Tampere, there is the Tampere Ring Road, which is important for car traffic and which is part of Finnish highways number 3 (on the west side) and number 9 (on the east side). The main stretch of the ring road sees over 50,000 vehicles per day, and, according to the ELY Centre of Pirkanmaa, the western part of the ring road is the busiest road in Finland, if highway and ring road connections in the Helsinki metropolitan area are excluded. There are also plans for another ring road project that would run from Pirkkala to Tampere's Hervanta and possibly in the future to Kangasala. Teiskontie, which runs east of the city center, is part of Highway 12 in the direction of Lahti. This highway also runs through the center of Tampere under the name Paasikiven–Kekkosentie, below the downtown as the Tampere Tunnel, which is the longest road tunnel built in Finland for car traffic.

=== Rail ===
Tampere is an important railroad hub in Finland and there are direct railroad connections to, for example, Helsinki, Turku and the Port of Turku, Oulu, Jyväskylä, and Pori. Every day about 150 trains with an annual total of 8 million passengers arrive and depart in the Tampere Central Railway Station, which is located in the city center. There are also frequent bus connections to destinations around Finland.

=== Aviation ===
Tampere is served by Tampere–Pirkkala Airport, located in neighboring municipality Pirkkala some 13 km (8 mi) southwest of the city, and it replaced the former Härmälä Airport, which was closed in 1979. The current airport is connected to the city centre of Tampere by bus route 103, and to that of Pirkkala by bus route 39.

=== Sea transport ===
In 2015, the Port of Tampere, the charter port area carrying passengers on the shores of Lake Näsijärvi and Lake Pyhäjärvi, was the busiest inland waterway in Finland in terms of the number of passengers (71,750). A partial explanation for the high number of passengers can be found in the summer traffic to the Viikinsaari island in Lake Pyhäjärvi, where people travel for an excursion or various cultural events such as watching a summer theater. Domestic passenger and connecting vessel traffic was only busier in the Finnish sea area in the Helsinki Metropolitan Area, between mainland Finland and Åland in the Archipelago Sea.

=== Urban transport ===
The public transport network in Tampere currently consists of a bus network and two lines of city's light rail, operating from 9 August 2021. The Tampere Bus Station, designed by Jaakko Laaksovirta and Bertel Strömmer, representing functionalist architecture, was completed in 1938, being the largest bus station in the Nordic countries at the time, and between 1948 and 1976, the city also had an extensive trolleybus network, which was also the largest trolleybus system in Finland. As of 2017, commuter rail service on the railroad lines connecting Tampere to the neighbouring towns of Nokia and Lempäälä is being established.

In the 2010s, Tampere has made efforts to invest in the smooth running of cycling and walkability. Thanks to it, the city was awarded the title of "Cycling Municipality of the Year" in 2013. According to a survey conducted in 2015, the attractiveness of both cycling and walking had increased during 2014 and 2015. In any case, during the 21st century, the growth of bicycle traffic has been clearly faster than the growth of the city's population, and the number of cycles has increased by an average of about 2% per year.

=== Distances to other cities ===
- Helsinki – 180 km (110 mi)
- Hämeenlinna – 79 km (49 mi)
- Joensuu – 396 km (246 mi)
- Jyväskylä – 150 km (93 mi)
- Kuopio – 297 km (185 mi)
- Lahti – 130 km (81 mi)
- Lappeenranta – 276 km (171 mi)
- Oulu – 490 km (300 mi)
- Pori – 110 km (68 mi)
- Seinäjoki – 177 km (110 mi)
- Turku – 163 km (101 mi)
- Vaasa – 240 km (150 mi)

== Government ==
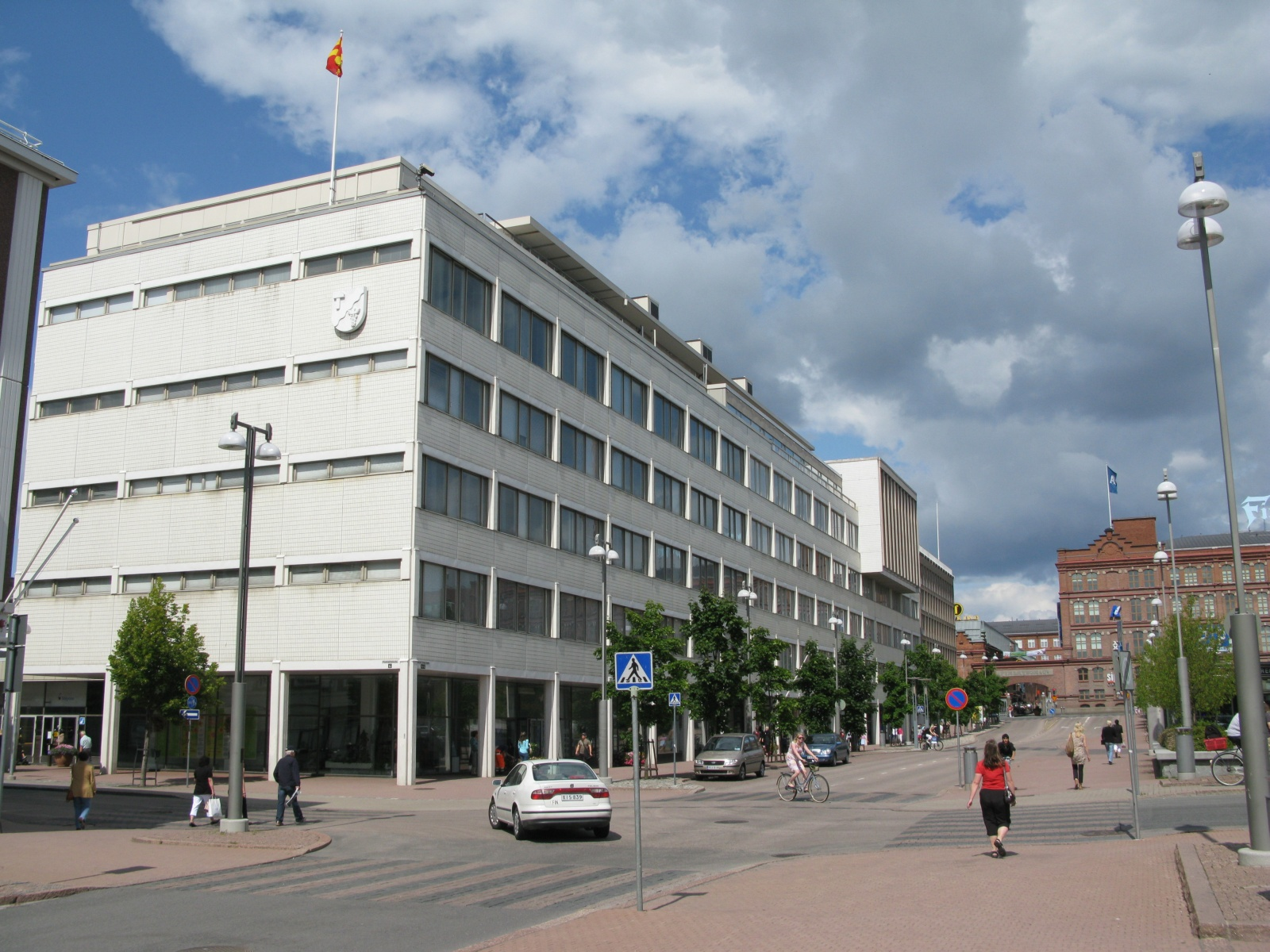
The Tampere City Central Office (Tampereen keskusvirastotalo), an administrative building of the City Council of Tampere along the Aleksis Kiven katu street

In 2007, Tampere switched to a new model of government. Since then, a mayor and four deputy mayors have been chosen for a period of four years by the city council. The mayor also becomes the seat of the city council for the duration of the tenure.

Tampere was the first Finnish municipality to have an elected mayor. The mayor has no official relationship with the municipality; they serve as chair of the city board and direct the municipality's activities. The mayor's duties are defined in the city government's bylaws. Because the mayor and deputy mayors are trustees, they can be removed by the council if they lose the majority trust.

For the first two years, Timo P. Nieminen, representing the National Coalition Party from 2007 to 2012, served as mayor. In 2013, Anna-Kaisa Ikonen of the same party was elected mayor. As of 1 June 2017, the number of deputy mayors decreased from four to three. Lauri Lyly (SDP) was elected Mayor of the City of Tampere for the period 2017–2021 at the City Council meeting on 12 June 2017.

City Council of Tampere Tampereen kaupunginvaltuusto

Leadership
- Chairperson: Kalervo Kummola, NCP

Structure
- Seats: 67
- Political groups: Social Democrats (20); National Coalition (17); Green League (12); Left Alliance (8); Finns Party (4); Centre Party (3); Christian Democrats (2); SFP (1)
- Length of term: 4 years

Elections
- Last election: 2025
- Next election: 2029

=== Mayors over time ===
- Kaarle Nordlund 1929–1943
- Sulo Typpö 1943–1957
- Erkki Lindfors 1957–1969
- Pekka Paavola 1969–1985
- Jarmo Rantanen 1985–2007
- Timo P. Nieminen (kok.) 2007–2012
- Anna-Kaisa Ikonen (kok.) 2013–2017
- Lauri Lyly (sd.) 2017–2021
- Anna-Kaisa Ikonen (kok.) 2021–2023
- Kalervo Kummola (kok.) 2023–2025
- Ilmari Nurminen (sd.) 2025–present

== Notable people ==
=== Born before 1900 ===
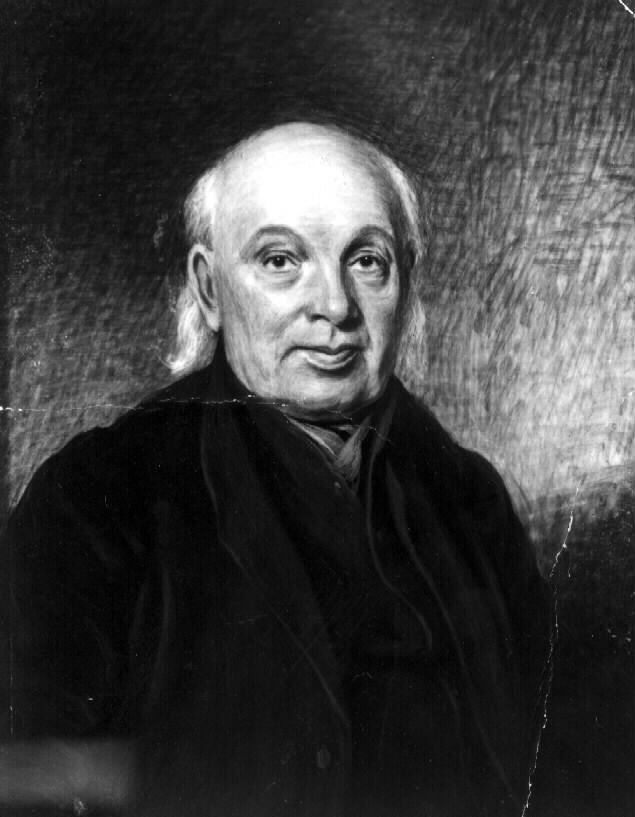
James Finlayson, Scottish Quaker and industrialist best known for founding the Finlayson company

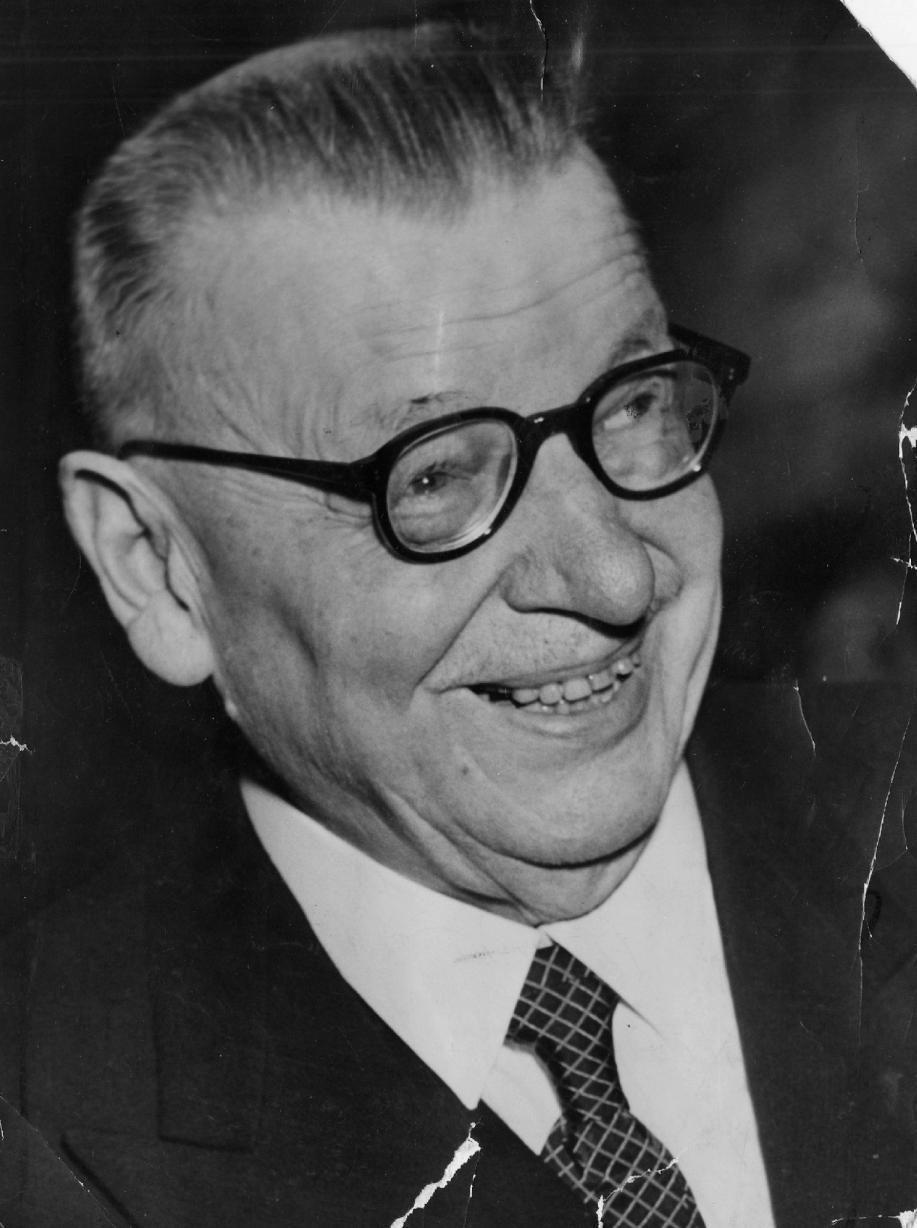
J. K. Paasikivi, the Prime Minister of Finland and later the 7th President of Finland

- Emil Aaltonen (1869–1949), industrialist and philanthropist
- Emanuel Aromaa (1873–1933), politician
- Eero Berg (1898–1969), long-distance runner and Olympic gold medalist
- Minna Canth (1844–1897), author and social activist
- Rosa Clay (1875–1959), a Namibian-born Finnish American teacher, singer and choral conductor
- Minna Craucher (1891–1932), socialite and spy
- James Finlayson (1772–1852), Scottish Quaker and industrialist
- Väinö Hakkila (1882–1958), politician
- Gustaf Idman (1885–1961), diplomat and a non-partisan Minister of Foreign Affairs
- Alma Jokinen (1882–1939), politician
- Feliks Kellosalmi (1877–1939), politician
- Augusta Laine (1867–1949), teacher of home economics and politician
- Frans Oskar Lilius (1871–1928), politician
- Wivi Lönn (1872–1966), architect
- Kaapo Murros (1875–1951), journalist, lawyer, writer and politician
- Juho Kusti Paasikivi (1870–1956), the Prime Minister of Finland and the 7th President of Finland
- Aaro Pajari (1897–1949), Major General and the Knight of the Mannerheim Cross
- Arvo Pohjannoro (1893–1963), Lutheran clergyman and politician
- Anders Rajala (1891–1957), wrestler
- Julius Saaristo (1891–1969) track and field athlete and Olympic gold medalist
- Matti Schreck (1897–1946), banker and film producer
- Frans Eemil Sillanpää (1888–1964), author and Nobel laureate
- Bertel Strömmer (1890–1962), architect
- Vilho Tuulos (1895–1967), triple jumper, long jumper and Olympic gold medalist
- August Wesley (1887–?), journalist, trade unionist and revolutionary

=== Born after 1900 ===
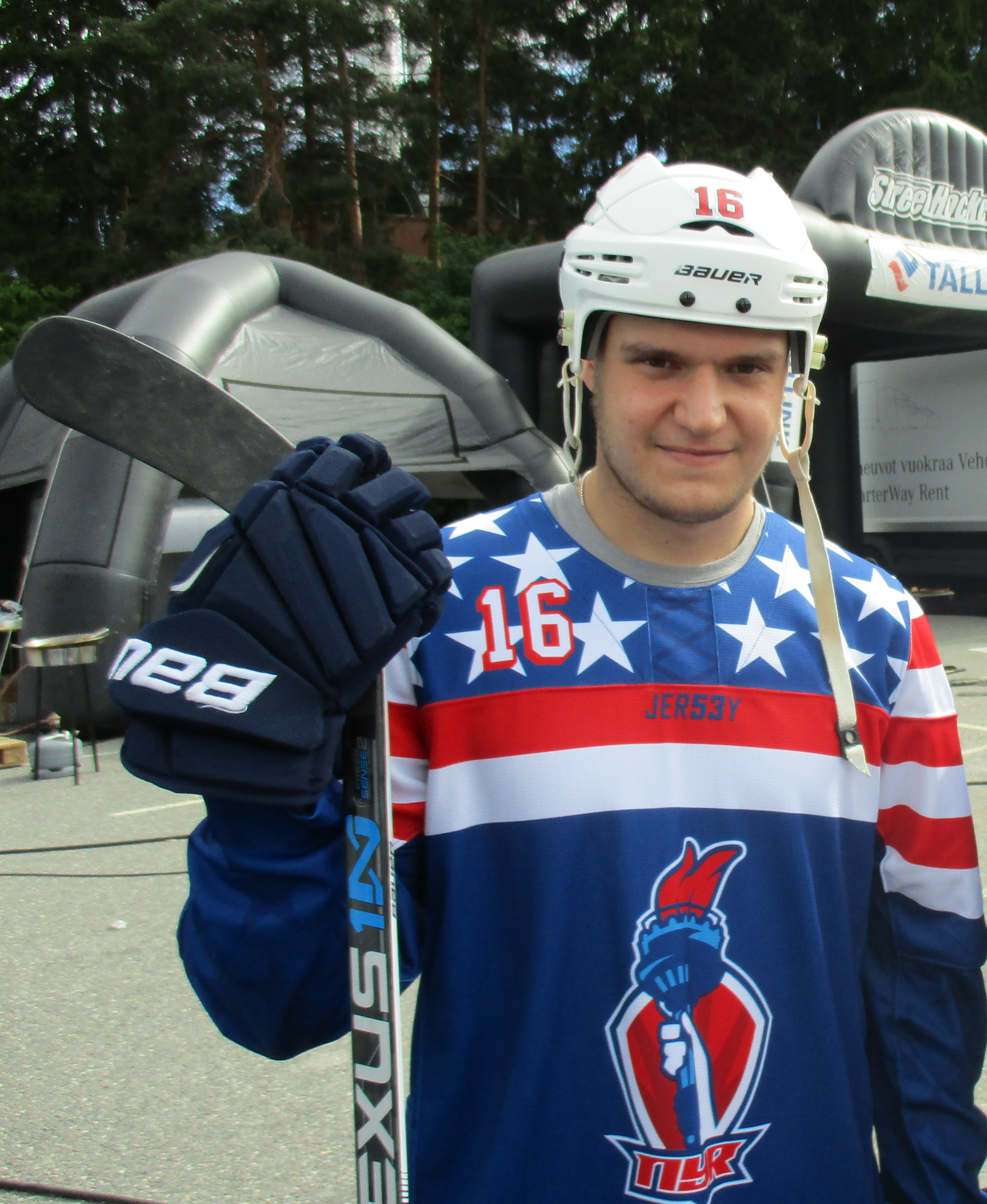
Aleksander Barkov, ice hockey player

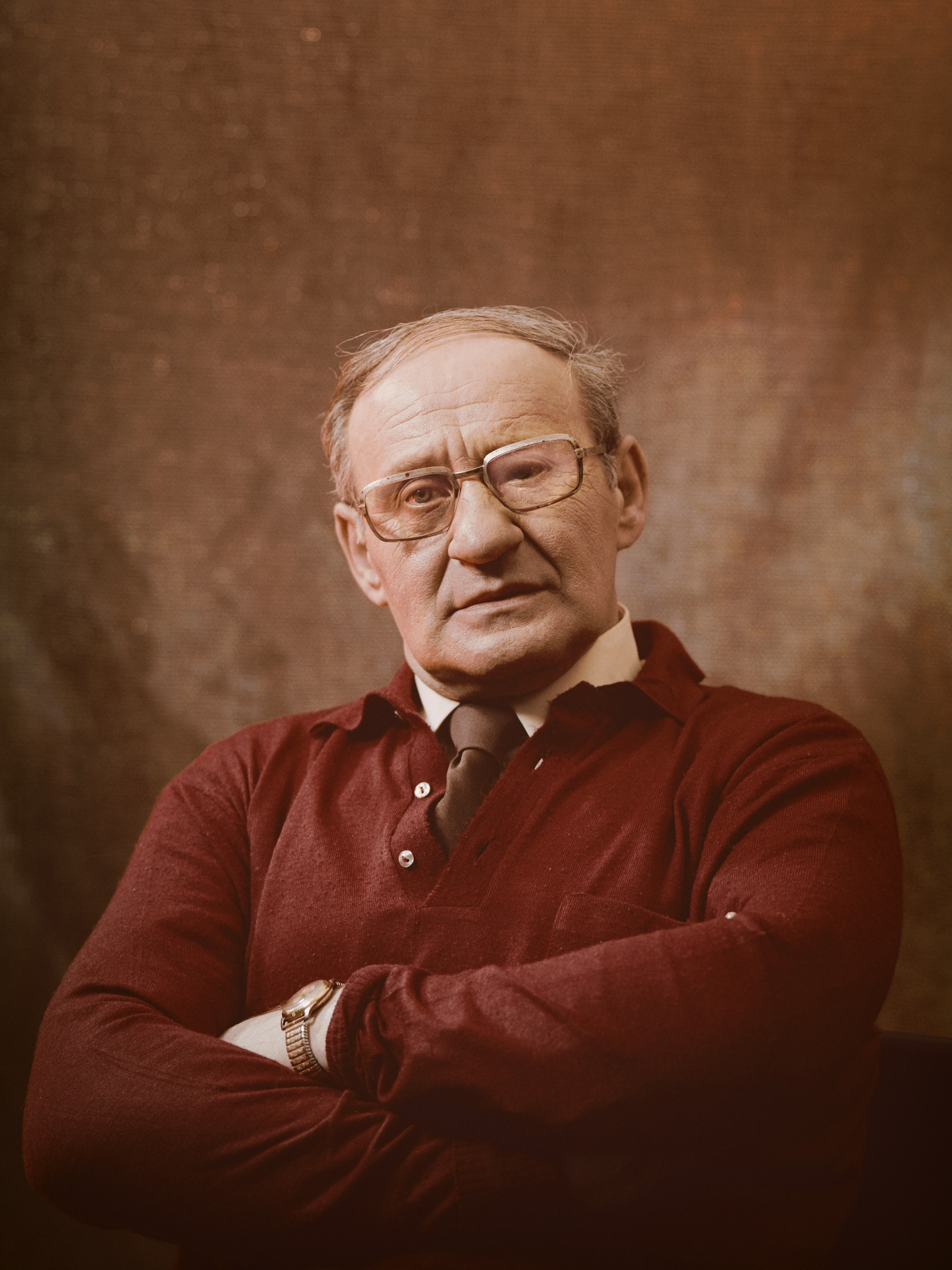
Väinö Linna, author of The Unknown Soldier and Under the North Star trilogy

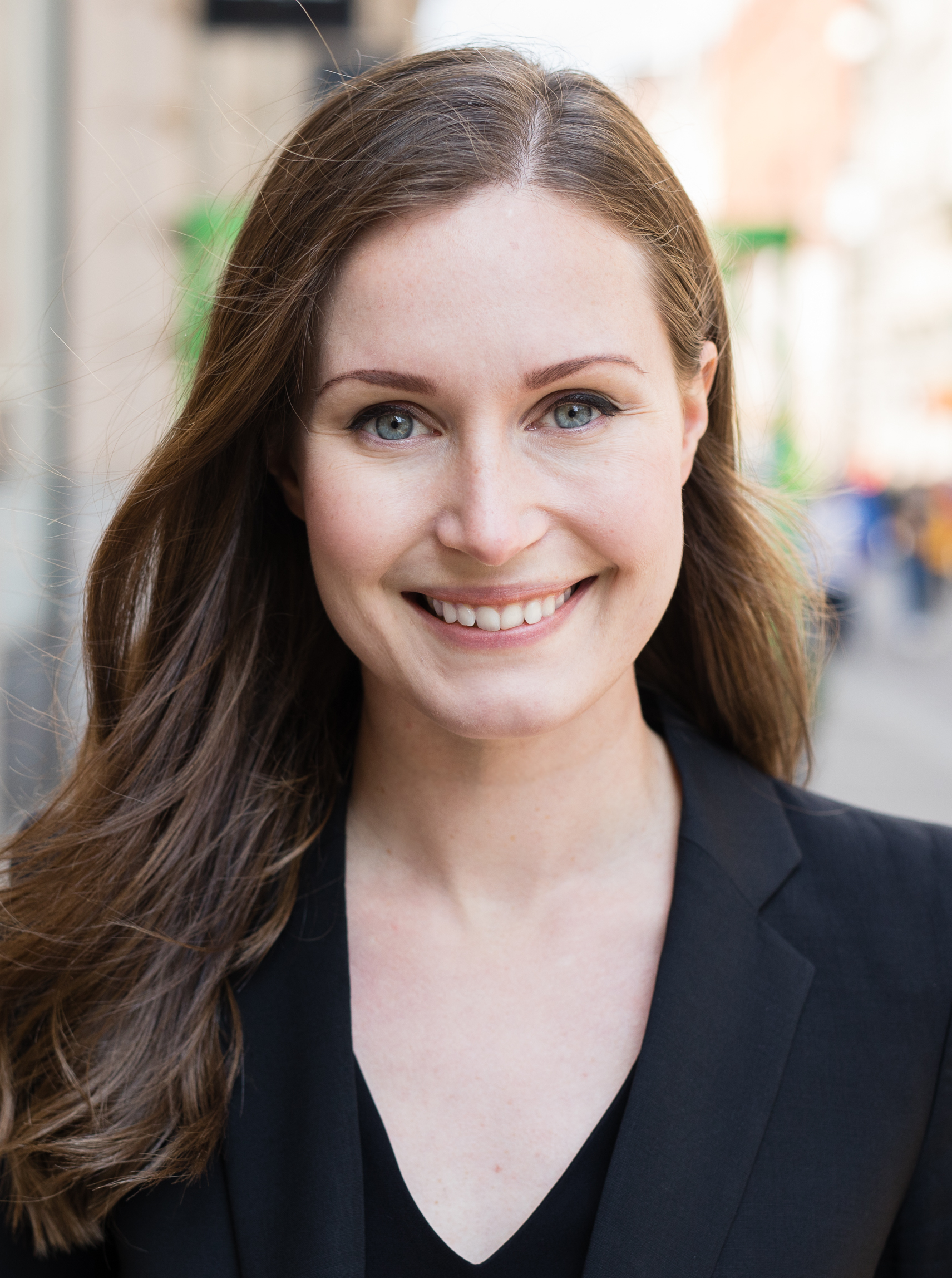
Sanna Marin, Prime Minister of Finland from 2019 to 2023.

- Jonne Aaron (born 1983), singer
- Sinikka Antila (born 1960), lawyer and diplomat
- Aleksander Barkov (born 1995), Finnish-Russian professional ice hockey player
- Anu Bradford (born 1975), Finnish-American author and law professor
- Johanna Debreczeni (born 1980), singer
- Henrik Otto Donner (1939–2013), composer and music personality
- Anna Falchi (born 1972), Finnish-Italian model and film actress
- Mauri Favén (1920–2006), painter
- Matti Haahti (born 1936), footballer
- Jussi Halla-aho (born 1971), politician and former leader of the Finns Party
- Roope Hintz (born 1996), professional ice hockey player
- Anja Ignatius (1911–1995), violinist and music educator
- Seppo Jokinen (born 1949), author
- Viljo Kajava (1909–1998), author and poet
- Tapani Kalliomäki (born 1970), stage and film actor
- Glen Kamara (born 1995), professional footballer
- Jorma Karhunen (1913–2002), Finnish Air Force ace and the Knight of the Mannerheim Cross
- Leo Kinnunen (1943–2017), Formula One driver
- Urpo Lahtinen (1931–1994), journalist and magazine publisher, founder of Tamperelainen
- Kimmo Leinonen (born 1949), ice hockey executive and writer
- Mika Koivuniemi (born 1967), bowling coach and professional ten-pin bowler
- Kiira Korpi (born 1988), figure skater
- Patrik Laine (born 1998), professional ice hockey player
- Väinö Linna (1920–1992), author
- Jyrki Lumme (born 1966), professional hockey player
- Tiina Lymi (born 1971), actress, director, screenwriter and author
- Taru Mäkelä (born 1959), film director and screenwriter
- Eeva-Liisa Manner (1921–1995), poet, playwright and translator
- Sanna Marin (born 1985), Prime Minister of Finland (2019–2023)
- Sakari Mattila (born 1989), professional footballer
- Matthau Mikojan (born 1982), rock musician, singer, guitarist and songwriter
- Pate Mustajärvi (1956–2025), rock singer
- Mikko Nousiainen (born 1975), actor
- Teppo Numminen (born 1968), professional ice hockey player
- Luka Nurmi (born 2004), racing driver
- Erno Paasilinna (1935–2000), author and journalist
- Pekka Paavola (1933–2023), politician and Minister of Justice
- Tero Palmroth (born 1953), racing driver
- Oiva Paloheimo (1910–1973), author, poet and aphorist
- Veijo Pasanen (1930–1988), actor
- Aku Pellinen (born 1993), racing driver
- Sakari Puisto (born 1976), politician
- Raisa Räisänen (1983–?), still missing 16-year-old girl, who was declared dead in absentia in 2007
- Matti Ranin (1926–2013), actor
- Leo Riuttu (1913–1989), actor
- Seela Sella (born 1936), actress
- Heikki Silvennoinen (1954-2024), musician and actor
- Kikka (1964–2005), pop and schlager singer
- Jukka Tapanimäki (1961–2000), software developer and game programmer
- Armi Toivanen (born 1980), actress
- Jussi Välimäki (born 1974), rally driver
- Lauri Viita (1916–1965), poet
- Erika Vikman (born 1993), singer
- Sofia Vikman (born 1983), politician
- Olavi Virta (1915–1972), singer
- Hans Wind (1919–1995), fighter pilot, flying ace and the Knight of the Mannerheim Cross
- Aki Yli-Salomäki (born 1972), composer, music critic and music journalist
- Markus Lervik (born 1982), musician, composer. Involved at punk scene since 1995.

== International relations ==
Tampere is twinned with:

- Chemnitz, Germany
- Essen, Germany
- Kaunas, Lithuania
- Kyiv, Ukraine
- Klaksvík, Faroe Islands
- Kópavogur, Iceland
- Linz, Austria
- Łódź, Poland (since 1996)
- Miskolc, Hungary
- Norrköping, Sweden
- Odense, Denmark
- Olomouc, Czech Republic
- Brașov, Romania
- Tartu, Estonia
- Trondheim, Norway (since 1946)
- Guangzhou, China
- Syracuse, United States

Tampere has two additional "friendship cities":

- León, Nicaragua
- Mwanza, Tanzania

== See also ==
- Battle of Tampere
- Mustamakkara
- Nokia, Finland
- Pirkkala
- Ratina Stadium
- Särkänniemi
- Tammerkoski
- Tampere Deck Arena
- Tampere Film Festival
- Tampere Tigers
