= List of festivals in Finland =

The following is an incomplete list of festivals in Finland.

== Festivals ==
- Helsinki Festival
- Helsinki Pride
- Baltic Circle Festival
- Tampere Theatre Festival
- ANTI – Contemporary Art Festival
- Art Centre KulttuuriKauppila
- Art Centre Salmela
- IHME Contemporary Art Festival
- Jyväskylä Arts Festival
- Kesäkumi
- Night of the Arts
- Tampere Theatre Festival
- Tangomarkkinat
- Assembly (demo party)
- Finnish Metal Expo
- Flow Festival
- Funky Elephant
- Helsinki Burlesque Festival
- Helsinki Comics Festival
- Helsinki International Film Festival
- Helsinki Samba Carnaval
- IHME Contemporary Art Festival
- Night Visions (film festival)
- Summer Sound Festival
- Tuska Open
- World Village Festival
- Finnish Metal Expo
- Helsinki Book Fair
- Tampere Floral Festival
- Tangomarkkinat
- Kaustinen Folk Music Festival
- Animatricks
- Art Centre KulttuuriKauppila
- Art Centre Salmela
- World Village Festival

=== Film festivals in Finland ===
- Animatricks
- Espoo Ciné International Film Festival
- Helsinki International Film Festival
- Midnight Sun Film Festival
- Night Visions (film festival)
- Oulu International Children's and Youth Film Festival
- Oulu Music Video Festival
- Tampere Film Festival
- Vinokino

=== Music festivals in Finland ===
- Flow Festival (Helsinki)
- Funky Elephant (Jyväskylä)
- Helsinki Samba Carnaval (Helsinki)
- Kaustinen Folk Music Festival (Kaustinen)
- Naantali Music Festival (Naantali)
- Organ Night & Aria Festival (Urkuyö)
- Rock Fest (Hyvinkää)
- Sommelo (Kuhmo)
- Summer Sound Festival (Lahti)
- Tuska Open (Helsinki)
