= IHME (disambiguation) =

IHME or Ihme may refer to:

- Institute for Health Metrics and Evaluation, Seattle, United States
- Ihme, river in Germany
- IHME Contemporary Art Festival, Finland
