= Helsinki Day =

Annual celebration in Finland

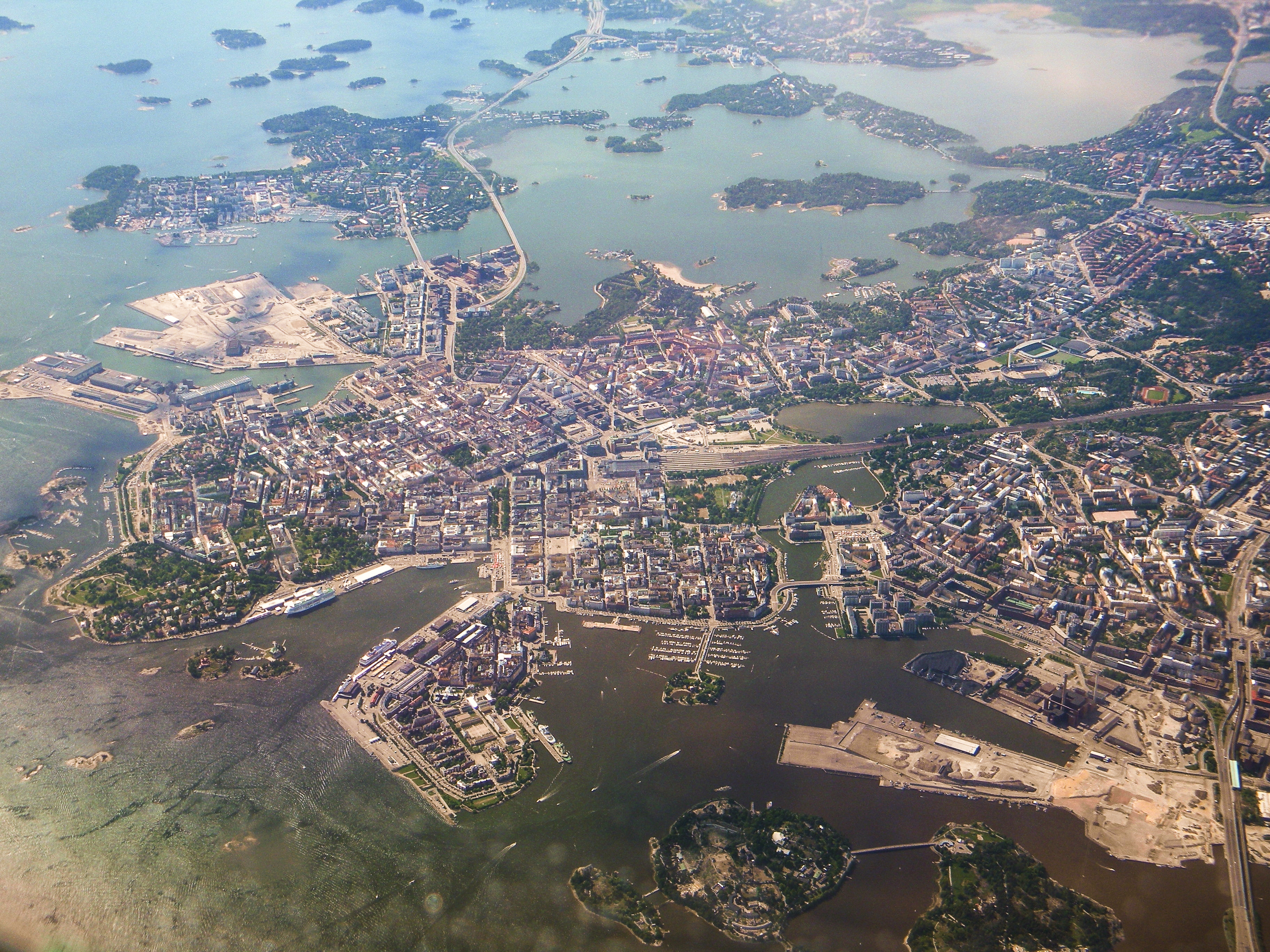
Image of Helsinki

Helsinki Day (Finnish: Helsinki-päivä, Swedish: Helsingforsdagen) is an annual celebration in Finland, held on 12 June, to celebrate the city of Helsinki. The number of attendees in the events on the day exceeds one hundred thousand. On the day, the Helsinki Medal is awarded to noteworthy citizens by the city council.

The event was started by mayor Lauri Aho and secretary of the Helsinki Society Jorma Waronen in the late 1950s. The first Helsinki day was celebrated in 1959 on the 409th anniversary of the founding of Helsinki.

The number of attendees at events on Helsinki Day already exceeded ten thousand in the early 1960s. In the same decade, the events were made more entertaining and diverse. Main events, such as ice hall concerts, were added. As the day gained popularity, the association of neighbourhood societies wanted to expand the celebration to a full Helsinki Week in the late 1970s, but the city council denied permission. Nowadays, Helsinki Week, culminating on Helsinki Day, has been established, and it is directed by the event unit of the Helsinki city council.

Since the 1990s, various units of the city council, organisations and corporations have organised events on Helsinki Day. The free-of-charge "Kaivari" concert in Kaivopuisto is probably the best known among the public, as well as the dinner under the sky which has been held in Helsinki since 2013.

Helsinki Day includes the selection of the annual Stadin Kundi ("Man of the city") and Stadin Friidu ("Woman of the city") by Stadin Slangi ry.

== See also ==
- Helsinki Pride
- Helsinki Samba Carnaval
- Tampere Day
