= Veijola =

Veijola is a Finnish surname.

== Geographical distribution ==
As of 2014, 98.1% of all known bearers of the surname Veijola were residents of Finland (frequency 1:10,450).

In Finland, the frequency of the surname was higher than national average (1:10,450) in the following regions:

1. North Ostrobothnia (1:1,627)
2. Lapland (1:5,975)
3. Kainuu (1:6,517)
4. Central Ostrobothnia (1:9,553)

== People ==
- Karl Gustaf Veijola (1864–1936), Finnish farmer and politician
