= World Village Festival =

Annual cultural festival in Helsinki, Finland

Coordinates: 60°10′30″N 24°56′35″E

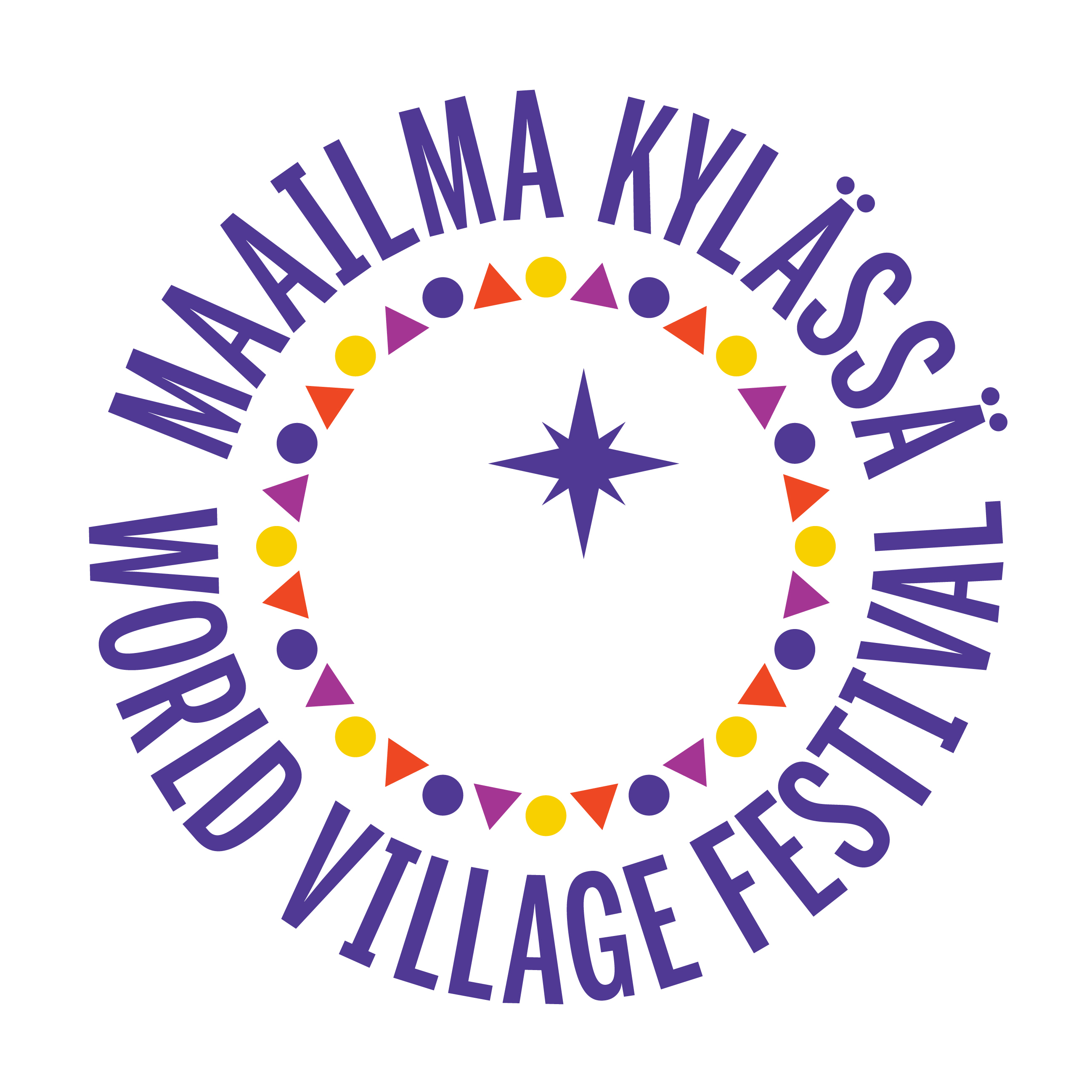
- World Village Festival's logo.
- Dates: 25.–26.5.2024
- Locations: Suvilahti, Helsinki
- Years active: 1995–
- Website: maailmakylassa.fi

The World Village Festival (Finnish: Maailma kylässä, Swedish: Världen i byn) is a free music and culture festival held annually in Helsinki, Finland at the end of May.

Over the weekend, the festival features events related to social issues, including music, documentary films, and discussions. The event is free of charge and accessible to all ages.

Between 1995 and 2005 the festival was held every other year, and since 2005 annually in late May. According to the organizers, some 70,000 to 80,000 people visit the festival annually while the number of exhibitors is around 400.

== Gallery ==
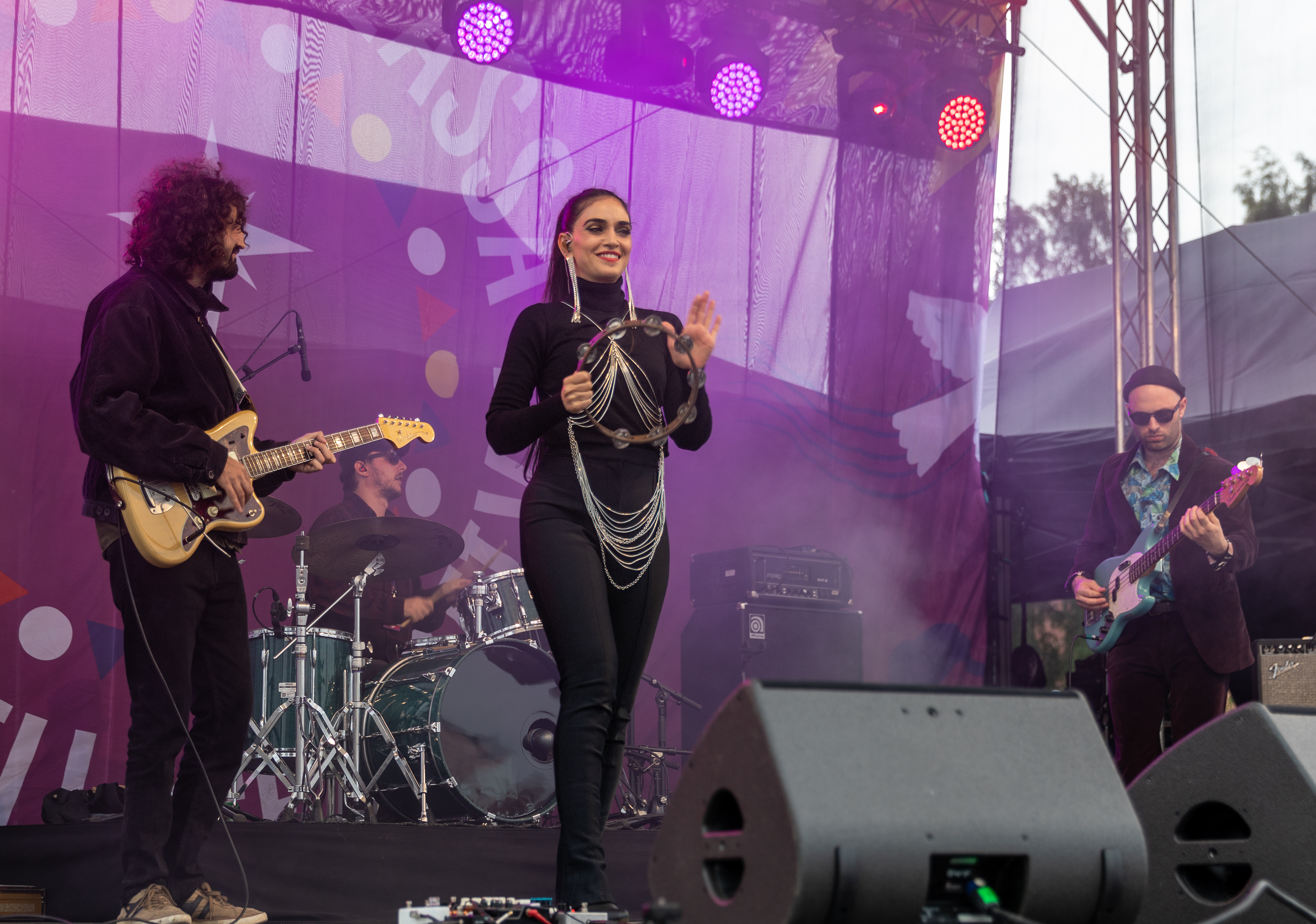
Liraz performing at the 2023 World Village Festival.

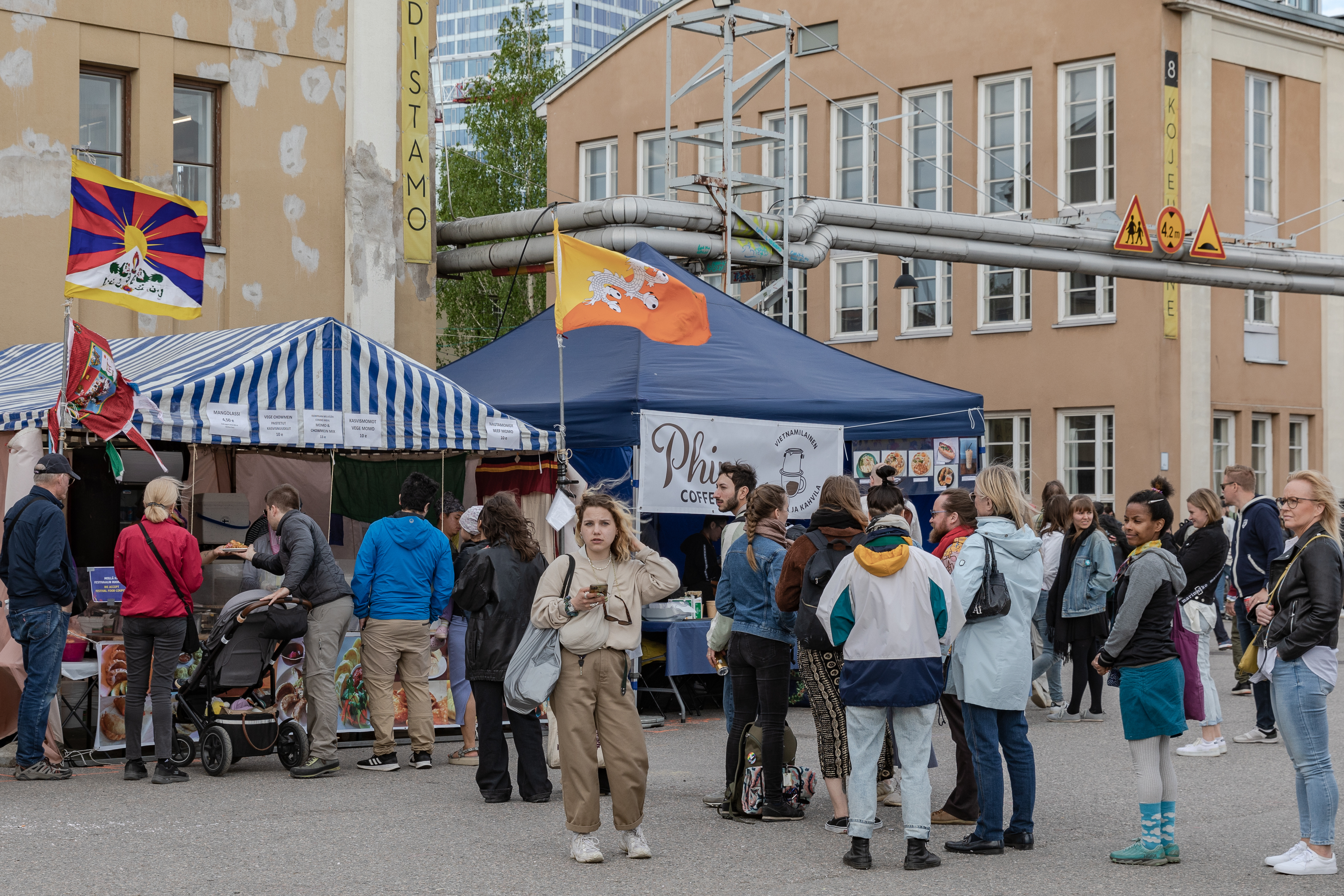
Food stands at the World Village Festival.

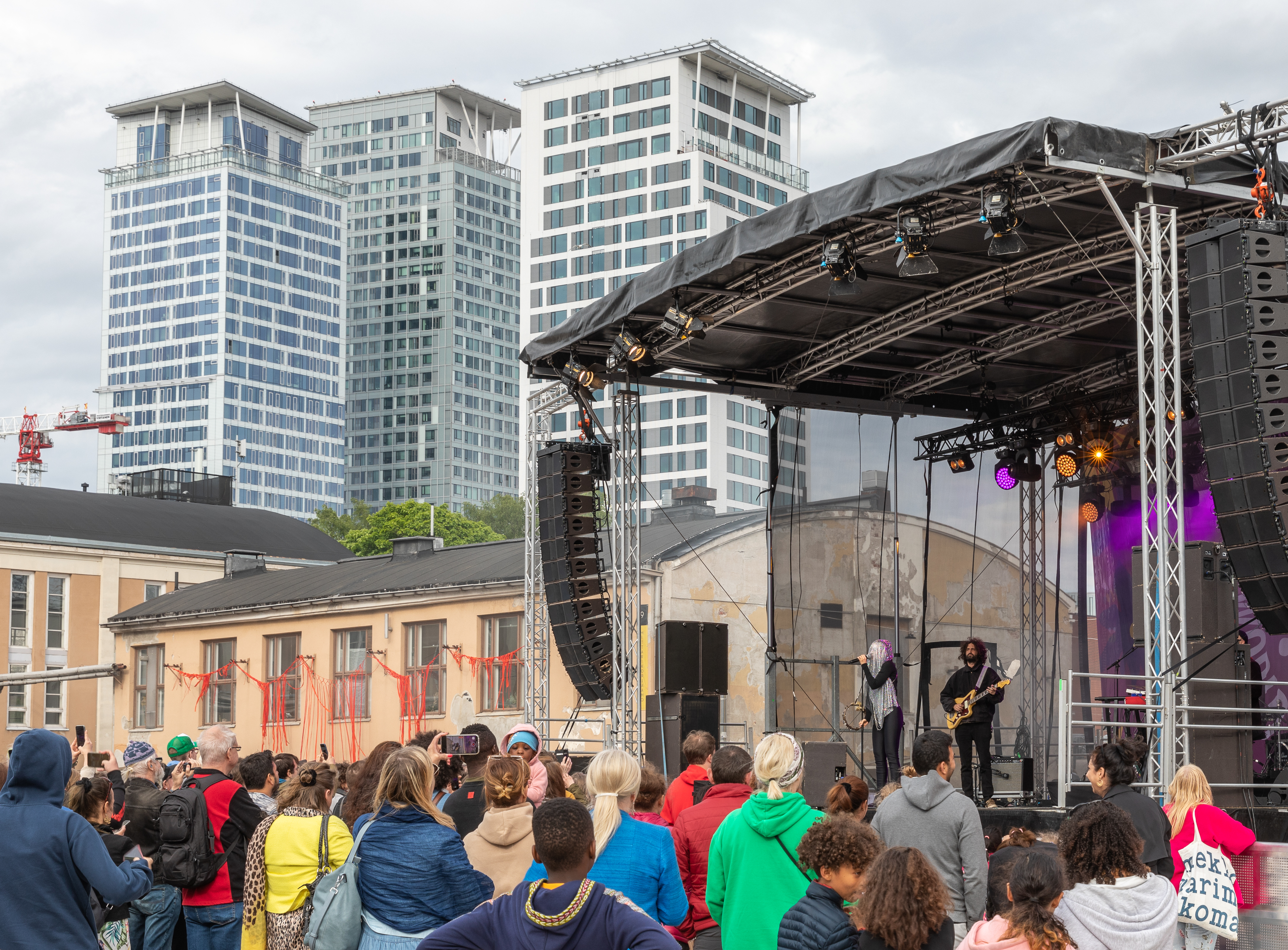
World Village Festival's Music Stage in 2023.

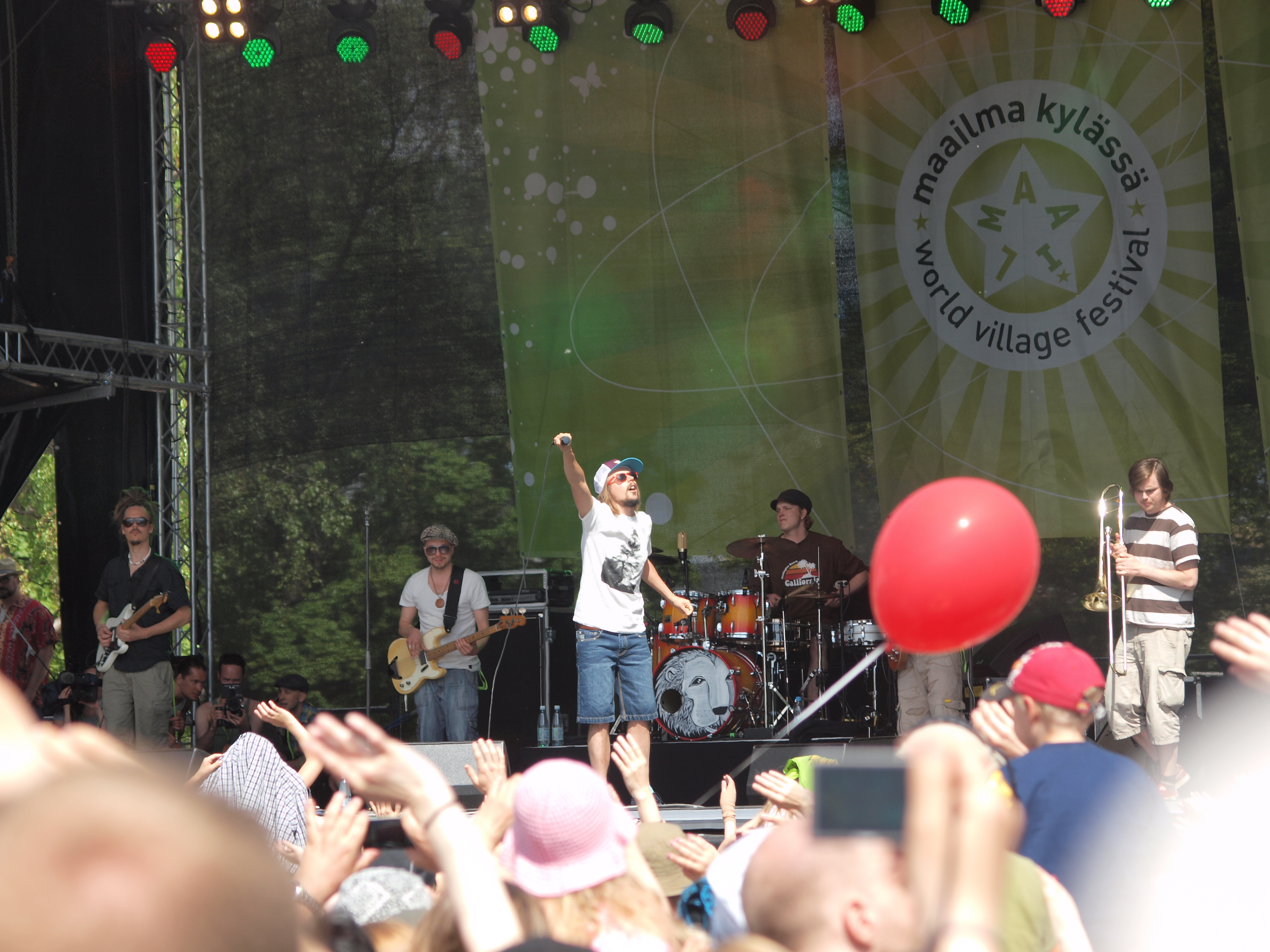
Jukka Poika performing at the World Village Festival in 2012

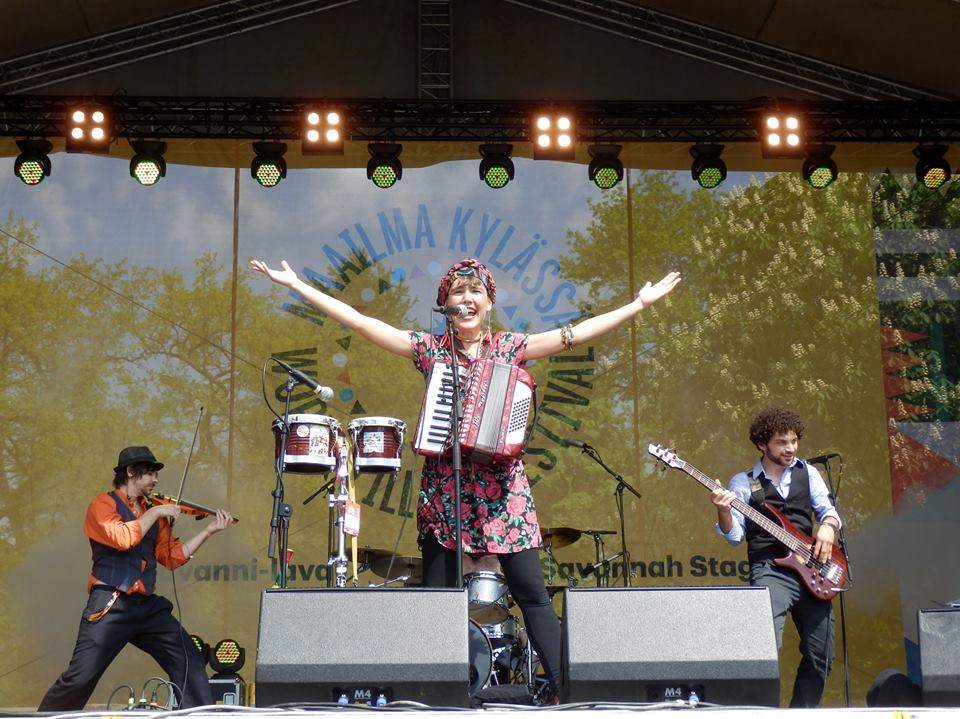
La Fanfarria del Capitán, Argentinean band, at World Village Festival 2014
