= Hannu Järvenpää =

Finnish ice hockey player and coach

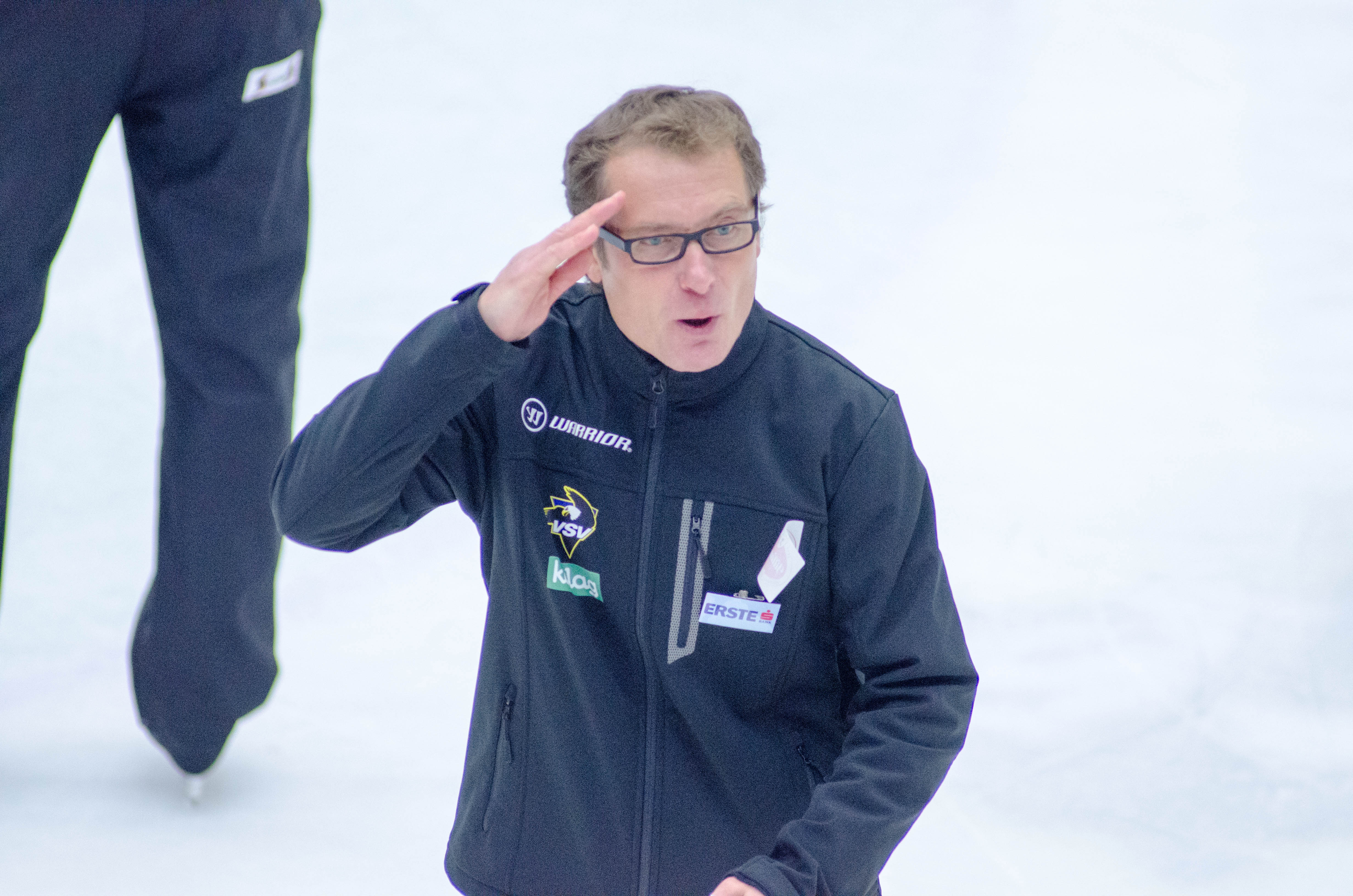
- Born: May 19, 1963 (age 62) Ii, Finland
- Height: 6 ft 0 in (183 cm)
- Weight: 194 lb (88 kg; 13 st 12 lb)
- Position: Right wing
- Shot: Left
- Played for: Winnipeg Jets
- National team: Finland
- NHL draft: 145th overall, 1982; Montreal Canadiens; 71st overall, 1986; Winnipeg Jets
- Playing career: 1981–1995

Hannu Rainer Järvenpää (born May 19, 1963 in Ii, Finland) is a Finnish ice hockey coach and a retired professional ice hockey player. He is the current Head Coach of HC Gherdëina, an Italian team playing in the Alps Hockey League.

Järvenpää played 114 games for the Winnipeg Jets of the NHL and is a member of the Finnish ice hockey Hall of Fame.

== Playing career ==
Järvenpää played for Kärpät in Finland's top-flight Liiga in the early- and mid-1980s. From 1986 to 1989, he played 114 games for the Winnipeg Jets in the National Hockey League (NHL). He then returned to Finland and joined Lukko in 1989, where he spent two years. The 1991–92 season saw him skate for Leksands IF in Sweden. After wearing Jokerit colours in 1992–93, he moved to fellow Liiga team Espoo Blues, where he spent the last two years of his playing career.

Järvenpää represented Finland's national team on several occasions, including the 1992 Olympic Games and the World Championships in 1985, 1986, 1989, 1991 and 1992 (silver medal).

== Coaching career ==
He served as assistant coach of Liiga team SaiPa from 2003 to 2005 followed by a one-year stint with fellow Liiga outfit Lahti Pelicans in the same position.

Järvenpää took over head coaching duties at HDD Olimpija Ljubljana, a Slovenian member of the Austrian Hockey League (EBEL), in 2009 and remained in that job until 2012. He then served as head coach of fellow EBEL team EV VSV from 2012 to November 2015, when he was sacked. In early January 2016, he was named head coach of Alba Volán Székesfehérvár and parted ways with the EBEL team at the end of the 2015–16 season.

In May 2016, he was named head coach of Lausitzer Füchse of the German second division DEL2. He was presented with DEL2 Coach of the Year honors in the 2016–17 season.

== Career statistics ==
=== Regular season and playoffs ===
			Regular season					Playoffs
Season	Team	League	GP	G	A	Pts	PIM	GP	G	A	Pts	PIM
1981–82	Kärpät	SM-l	14	11	2	13	18	3	1	1	2	4
1982–83	Kärpät	SM-l	33	15	8	23	54	—	—	—	—	—
1983–84	Kärpät	SM-l	37	15	13	28	46	10	3	3	6	10
1983–84	Olympiajoukkue	SM-l	4	1	0	1	4	—	—	—	—	—
1984–85	Kärpät	SM-l	34	12	12	24	45	7	2	2	4	2
1985–86	Kärpät	SM-l	36	26	9	35	48	5	5	2	7	12
1986–87	Winnipeg Jets	NHL	20	1	8	9	8	—	—	—	—	—
1987–88	Winnipeg Jets	NHL	41	6	11	17	34	—	—	—	—	—
1987–88	Moncton Hawks	AHL	5	3	1	4	2	—	—	—	—	—
1988–89	Winnipeg Jets	NHL	53	4	7	11	41	—	—	—	—	—
1988–89	Moncton Hawks	AHL	4	1	0	1	0	—	—	—	—	—
1989–90	Lukko	SM-l	38	12	15	27	48	—	—	—	—	—
1990–91	Lukko	SM-l	43	27	18	45	54	—	—	—	—	—
1991–92	Leksands IF	SEL	22	4	4	8	28	—	—	—	—	—
1991–92	Leksands IF	Allsv	18	2	8	10	16	11	1	3	4	12
1992–93	Jokerit	SM-l	44	6	8	14	36	3	0	1	1	0
1993–94	Kiekko-Espoo	SM-l	44	15	16	31	40	—	—	—	—	—
1994–95	Kiekko-Espoo	SM-l	45	9	6	15	20	4	0	0	0	2
SM-l totals			372	149	107	256	413	32	11	9	20	30
NHL totals			114	11	26	37	83	—	—	—	—	—

=== International ===
Year	Team	Event	GP	G	A	Pts	PIM
1981	Finland	EJC	5	2	1	3	4
1982	Finland	WJC	7	4	4	8	6
1983	Finland	WJC	6	0	1	1	4
1985	Finland	WC	10	9	2	11	10
1986	Finland	WC	9	5	4	9	12
1989	Finland	WC	9	2	1	3	4
1991	Finland	WC	9	2	2	4	22
1991	Finland	CC	6	0	1	1	4
1992	Finland	OG	8	5	6	11	14
1992	Finland	WC	8	1	3	4	14
Junior totals			19	6	6	12	14
Senior totals			59	24	19	43	80
