= Tampere Day =

Anniversary of the city of Tampere, Finland

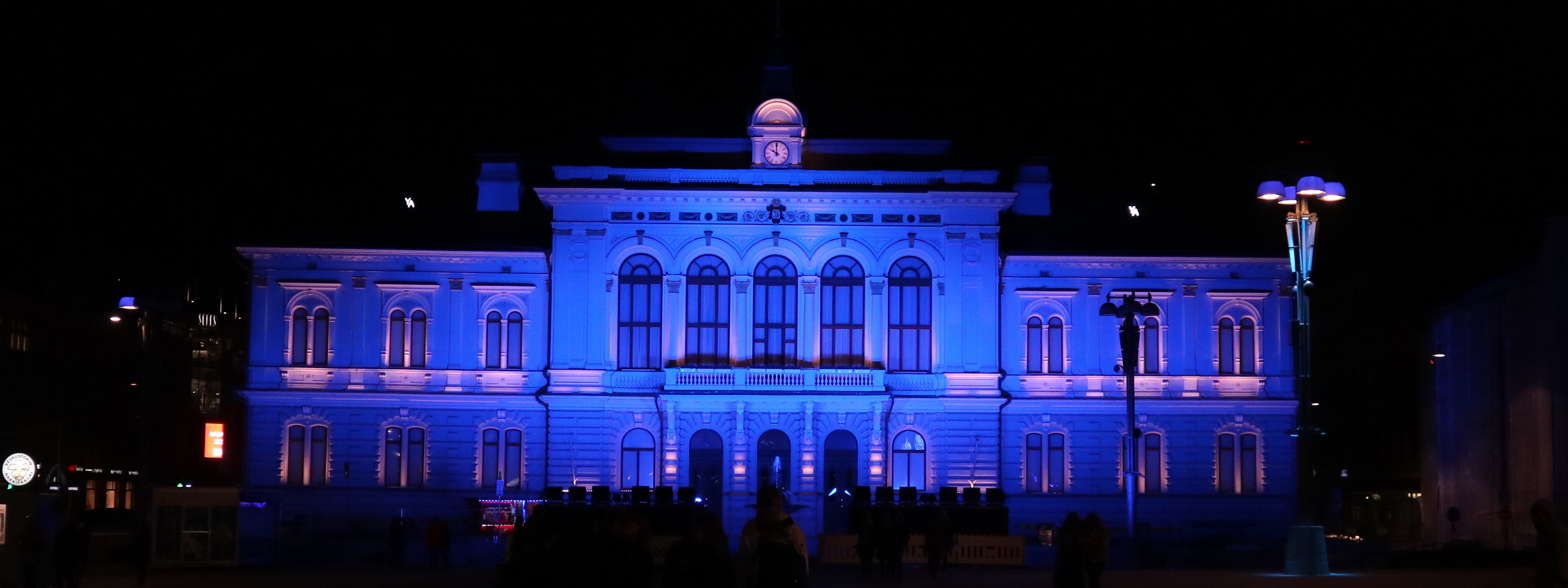
The blue-lit frontage of the Tampere City Hall at Tampere's 240th anniversary on October 1, 2019

Tampere Day (Finnish: Tampereen päivä; Swedish: Tammerforsdagen) is an annual celebration in Finland, held on October 1, to celebrate the city of Tampere; on that date, Tampere was granted full city rights in 1779. Tampere Day has been celebrated since 1955, when the decision to celebrate Tampere Day was made by the city government in 1954. Tampere Day is associated with many events where the city's agencies and institutions, as well as many companies, associations and communities, present their activities. The program also includes guided tours, among other things. In addition, the city will host an official gala reception for invited guests at the Tampere City Hall.

Tens of thousands of city dwellers take part in the events of Tampere Day every year. Popular places to visit have included local fire stations. In 2020, Tampere Day was celebrated online, as traditional public events were not organized due to the COVID-19 situation.

On Tampere Day, it is customary to award the Tampere Prize (Tampereen palkinto) to one or more people for work done for Tampere; the prize, founded in 1959, is awarded by the city government only to those who, either through their life's work or their activities, have contributed to the development of Tampere and the well-being of the people of Tampere or have been to increase Tampere's attractiveness.

== See also ==
- Helsinki Day
