= ART Ii Biennale =

ART Ii Biennale of Northern Environmental and Sculpture Art produces ecologically sustainable artworks to the cultural tradition areas of Ii, Finland. The biennale is organized by the Art Centre KulttuuriKauppila. The art works of ART Ii Biennale are created in ten days with the assistance of the inhabitants of the small town of Ii, located on the northern coast of Finland. The art works of the Biennale 2008 and 2010 are situated by a riverside path connecting the 700-year-old harbour area of Hamina and KulttuuriKauppila Art Centre. ART Ii Seminar gathers together professional artists, curators, representatives and officers of art and culture organizations and institutions as well as politics to consider and develop together current issues in the field of northern environmental and sculpture art. Curator and researcher Otso Kantokorpi led the seminar in 2010.

== Artists - Biennale 2008 ==
- Alfio Bonanno, Denmark
- Vladimir Zorin, Russia
- Jenni Tieaho, Finland
- Eyglò Hardardòttir, Iceland

== Artists - Biennale 2010 ==
- Lars Vilks, Sweden
- Helena Kaikkonen, Finland
- Egil Martin Kurdøl, Norway
- Maria Panínguak` Kjærulff, Greenland
- Linus Ersson, Sweden
- Maruyama Yoshiko, Japan
