= Karl Gustaf Veijola =

Finnish politician

Karl Gustaf Veijola (11 November 1864, Ii, Finland – 4 September 1936) was a Finnish farmer and politician. He was a Member of the Parliament of Finland from 1908 to 1909, representing the Agrarian League.
