= Art Centre KulttuuriKauppila =

Arts centre in Ii, Finland

Art Centre KulttuuriKauppila is an art centre in Ii, Finland. Local artists Helena Kaikkonen, Sanna Koivisto and Antti Ylönen founded it in 2006. KulttuuriKauppila produces every year art exhibitions, art workshops and lectures.

== Home artists ==
The founder members of KulttuuriKauppila – textile artist Helena Kaikkonen, visual artist Sanna Koivisto and visual artists, ceramic Antti Ylönen - work in the art centre, where they have their own studios. Krunni Production Ltd. has also a studio in the ateljé house of the art centre.

== Artist residence ==
The international Artist-in-Residence programme of KulttuuriKauppila supports and produces international professional art. Every year KulttuuriKauppila chooses about six artists to take part of the AIR-programme. Applications for the residence are processed twice a year.

== Summer exhibition ==
Every summer KulttuuriKauppila produces a large summer exhibition which is open to the public from June until August. KulttuuriKauppila's first summer exhibition was produced in 2007.

== ART Ii Biennale ==
Art Centre KulttuuriKauppila organizes ART Ii Biennale of Northern Environmental and Sculpture Art every second year. ART Ii Biennale produces ecologically sustainable artworks to the cultural tradition areas of Ii.
