= Dinner under the Helsinki sky =

Outdoor eating event in Helsinki, Finland

Dinner under the Helsinki sky Illallinen Helsingin taivaan
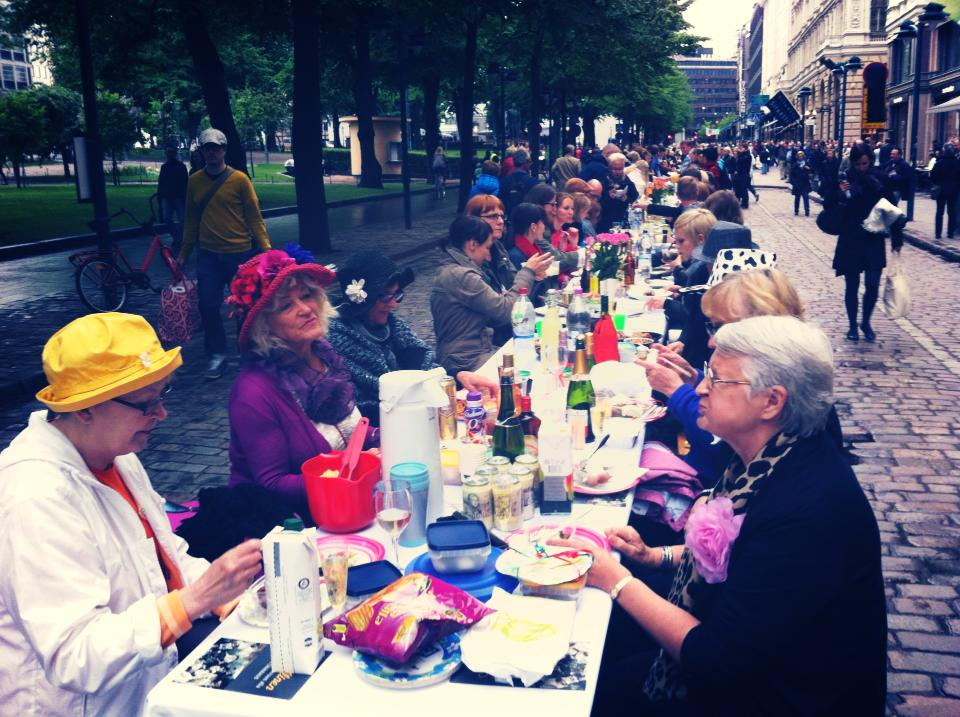
- 2013 Dinner under the Helsinki sky
- Status: active
- Genre: dining event
- Date: midyear
- Frequency: annual
- Location: Helsinki
- Country: Finland
- Inaugurated: 12 June 2013

Dinner under the Helsinki sky (Finnish: Illallinen Helsingin taivaan alla, Swedish: Middag under Helsingfors himmel) is an event where people gather for a picnic dinner outside into an urban public spaces for example in yards, parks, sidewalks or squares.

The event was organised for the first time in Helsinki as a part of the Helsinki Day 12.6.2013. It was organised in one of the main streets, Pohjoisesplanadi, which was closed from traffic. The tables for 1000 participants were carried on the street and covered with white tablecloths where participants set their own dinner. The event was free but 700 places were booked out in the event's webpage after two minutes. The rest of the places could be redeemed from the Helsinki City Hall.

== Dinner under the Helsinki sky Everywhere ==
Inspired by the Helsinki-day event, the dinner under the Helsinki sky was organised again 8.8.2013. This time all residents could organize the dinner where ever they wanted, in the inner yards, nearest parks or for example on the sidewalk in front of their own house. The participants had to point out their dinner on a map in the event's web page and cover their tables with white tablecloths. The dinners were organized for example in one of the main parks in Helsinki, on a beach, and in the Teurastamo courtyard. The event was organized in co-operation with Helsingin Energia and Helsinki city's Department of Public works.

Similar events have been organized around the world, for example, the Dîner en blanc, which has been arranged since 1988. The Dinner under the Helsinki sky is however more an unofficial and informal event where all the inhabitants can take part in.

The event has been repeated every year since, as advertised by the city's Helsinki Day event page as of 2024.

== Background ==
Both events are created by Yhteismaa ry - Commonland, organization whose other projects are The Cleaning day, Parking day and Nifty Neighbor – A Place to Care.
