= Helsinki Book Fair =

Annual books trade fair in Helsinki, Finland since 2001

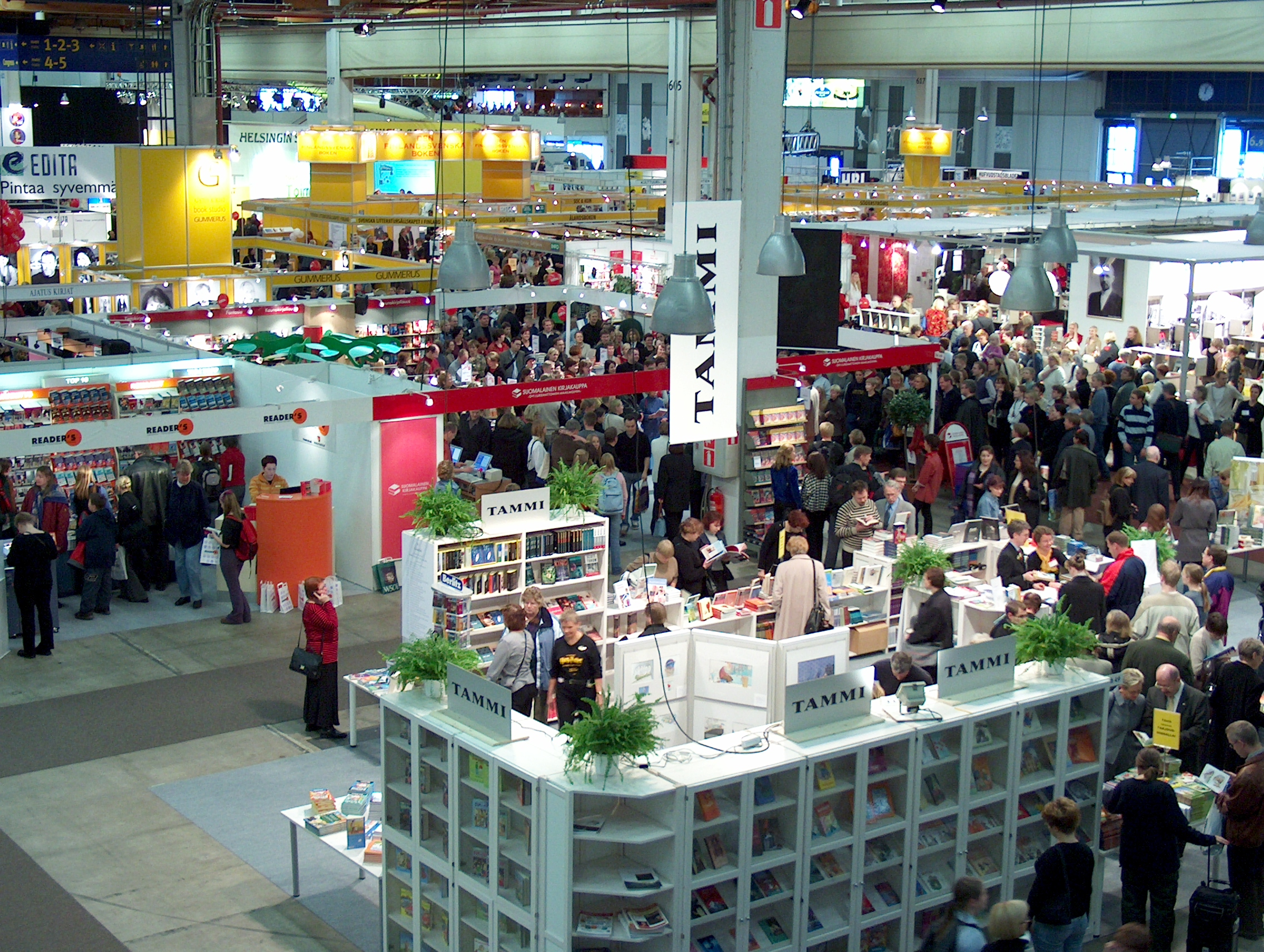
Helsinki Book Fair in 2003

The Helsinki Book Fair (Finnish: Helsingin Kirjamessut) is an annual trade fair for books, held since 2001.

== History and operations ==
The festival is held in October in Helsinki Exhibition and Convention Centre in Helsinki, Finland.

== See also ==
- Finnish literature
- List of festivals in Finland
- List of literary festivals
