= Kuivaniemi =

- Former municipality
- Kuivaniemen kunta Kuivaniemi kommun
- Coat of arms

- Location of Kuivaniemi in Finland
- Coordinates: 65°36′15″N 025°12′30″E
- Country: Finland
- Region: North Ostrobothnia
- Sub-region: Oulunkaari
- Charter: 1867
- Consolidated: 2007

Area
  - Total: 1,149.58 km^{2} (443.86 sq mi)
  - Land: 927.21 km^{2} (358.00 sq mi)
  - Water: 222.37 km^{2} (85.86 sq mi)

Population (2006-12-31)
  - Total: 1,977
  - Density: 2.132/km^{2} (5.522/sq mi)
- Time zone: UTC+2 (EET)
  - Summer (DST): UTC+3 (EEST)

Kuivaniemi is a former municipality of Finland.

It was located in the province of Oulu and is part of the North Ostrobothnia region. The municipality had a population of 1,977 on 31 December 2006 (ranked 351st) and covered a land area of 927.21 square kilometres (358.00 sq mi) on 1 January 2006. The population density was 2.1 inhabitants per square kilometre (5.4/sq mi).

The municipality was unilingually Finnish.

Kuivaniemi was incorporated into Ii municipality on 1 January 2007. The formed municipality inherited Kuivaniemi's seal-sporting coat of arms.
