= Animatricks =

Animatricks is an annual animation festival taking place in Helsinki every April. Palikka ry, the organization behind the festival l, was formed in 1999, with the first Animatricks festival taking place in 2000. Animatricks is the only film festival in Finland focused purely on animation. The festival program consists of Finnish and international compilations of films and screenings put together based on the festivals current theme. The Animatricks festival also includes a competition for the best international animation and the winner is awarded 3000 euros.

== Winners of the Finnish short animation competition ==
- Laura Neuvonen: Kutoja, 2005
- Anna Virtanen: Lauantai vuonna, 2005
- Ami Lindholm: Ilo irti, 2006
- Kim Helminen: Säieteoria, 2007
- Leena Jääskeläinen: Vaihdokas, 2009
- Kaisa Penttilä: Munaralli, 2010
- Jari Vaara: Syntymäpäivä, 2011
- Heta Jokinen: Sivussa, 2013
- Kari Pieskä: Viis Varpaista, 2014
- Pietari Bagge, Christer Hongisto, Elisa Ikonen ja Inka Matilainen: Valvoja, 2015

== Winners of the international short animation competition ==
- Tomek Ducki : Baths (Łaźnia), 2014
- Matt Reynold: Bottomfeeders, 2015
- Cerise Lopez and Agnès Patron: Chuylen - a crow's tale, 2016
- Sander Joon: Sierra, 2022
- Stephen Irwin: World to Roam, 2023
