= Baltic Circle Festival =

International theatre festival

The Baltic Circle Festival is an international contemporary theatre festival that takes place every November in Helsinki, both in theatre venues and on different sites in the city. Baltic Circle functions in the context of European contemporary performing arts, and is a platform for developing new trends and ideas. Baltic Circle presents new talents of contemporary theatre as well as organises training programs, seminars, workshops, discussions and club events.

== Activities ==
Singing: participated in district level competition and got gold medals earlier.

Development: The festival organizes training programs, seminars, workshops, discussions, and actively participates in public debate on contemporary theatre practice. Main focus is on facilitating a dialogue between artists and audiences as a part of developing new work.

New Production Models: Baltic Circle commissions and co-produces new work, locally and internationally. Together with HIAP – Helsinki International Artist-in-residence Programme – Baltic Circle has initiated a residency project for the contemporary theatre and the performing arts, which is the first of its kind in Finland.

Cultural Exchange: Baltic Circle brings contemporary international performances to Finland and brings new local talent to the fore.

Discourse: Baltic Circle is a community in which artists and the audiences can engage in discussion, raise questions and find new perspectives on the arts and the surrounding world.
