= Tampere Theatre Festival =

The Tampere Theatre Festival, or Tampereen Teatterikesä, takes place in Tampere, Finland, at the beginning of August and is the oldest annual theatre festival in the Nordic countries.

The festival was founded in 1968 and the first festival was held in 1969 with support from Tampereen Teatterikerho (Tampere Theatre Club). Today the festival features a couple of hundred theatre performances and hundreds of other events each year. The total number of visitors in 2005 was 92,000. In 2015 the Tampere Theatre Festival was the ninth largest festival in Finland in terms of tickets sold and the fourth largest in terms of visitors. The content of the Tampere Theatre Festival consists of six programs: the main program, the program tent, the restaurant festival Encorebaana, OFF Tampere, the night of the events and other programs.

The main program of the Tampere Theatre Festival consists of performances by international guests and professional Finnish theatres. It consists of about 20 groups in average, of which about a third comes from abroad.

Additionally, both professional and amateur theatres can be seen in the OFF series. The program contains drama, dance theatre, street performances and club and restaurant shows. Workshops, seminars, exhibitions and meetings for professionals and amateurs are also organised in connection to the Theatre Festival.

The Encorebaana is a free-of-charge restaurant festival held in restaurants, with performances ranging from stand-up comedy to monologues and from poetry to circus.

A related event that takes place during Tampere Theatre Festival is the cross-artistic Tapahtumien Yö, The Great Nocturnal Happening, which features a wide variety of arts and culture and is co-produced by the festival.
