= Vinokino =

LGBTQ film festival in Finland

- Location: Turku, Finland; Helsinki, Finland; Jyväskylä, Finland; Oulu, Finland; Tampere, Finland
- Established: 1991

Vinokino is an annual lesbian and gay film festival in Finland. It is held in October and November, across five cities: Helsinki, Jyväskylä, Oulu, Tampere, and Turku. The festival usually lasts three days in each city.

Vinokino is the only film festival in Finland exclusively presenting gay and lesbian films. The program typically consists of a number of feature films, some documentaries, and at least two selections of short films. All films are either in English or subtitled in English.

== Name ==
The name of the festival, Vinokino, is a compound noun meaning "slanted" or "tilted cinema", emphasising the fact that the festival gives through its selection of films a non-straight slant on relationships and culture.

== History ==
The festival started in 1991 in the southwestern city of Turku. In 2001, the festival spread to Helsinki, the Finnish capital.

== Operations ==
The festival has its headquarters in Turku, which is also where the screenings start every year. Screening then move to Helsinki; the same program is offered in both cities. Smaller film selections are shown in Jyväskylä, Oulu and Tampere.

== See also ==
- List of LGBT film festivals
- Helsinki Pride
