= La Fanfarria del Capitán =

Argentine band

- Origin: Buenos Aires, Argentina
- Genres: Fanfarria Latina, Rock, Ska, Balkan, Cumbia
- Years active: 2004–present
- Members: Victoria Cornejo; Jerónimo Cassagne; Francisco Mercado; Federico Sanchez; Juan Pablo Pelaez; Alma Errea Kozac; Mauro Scopigno
- Website: lafanfarriadelcapitan.com.ar

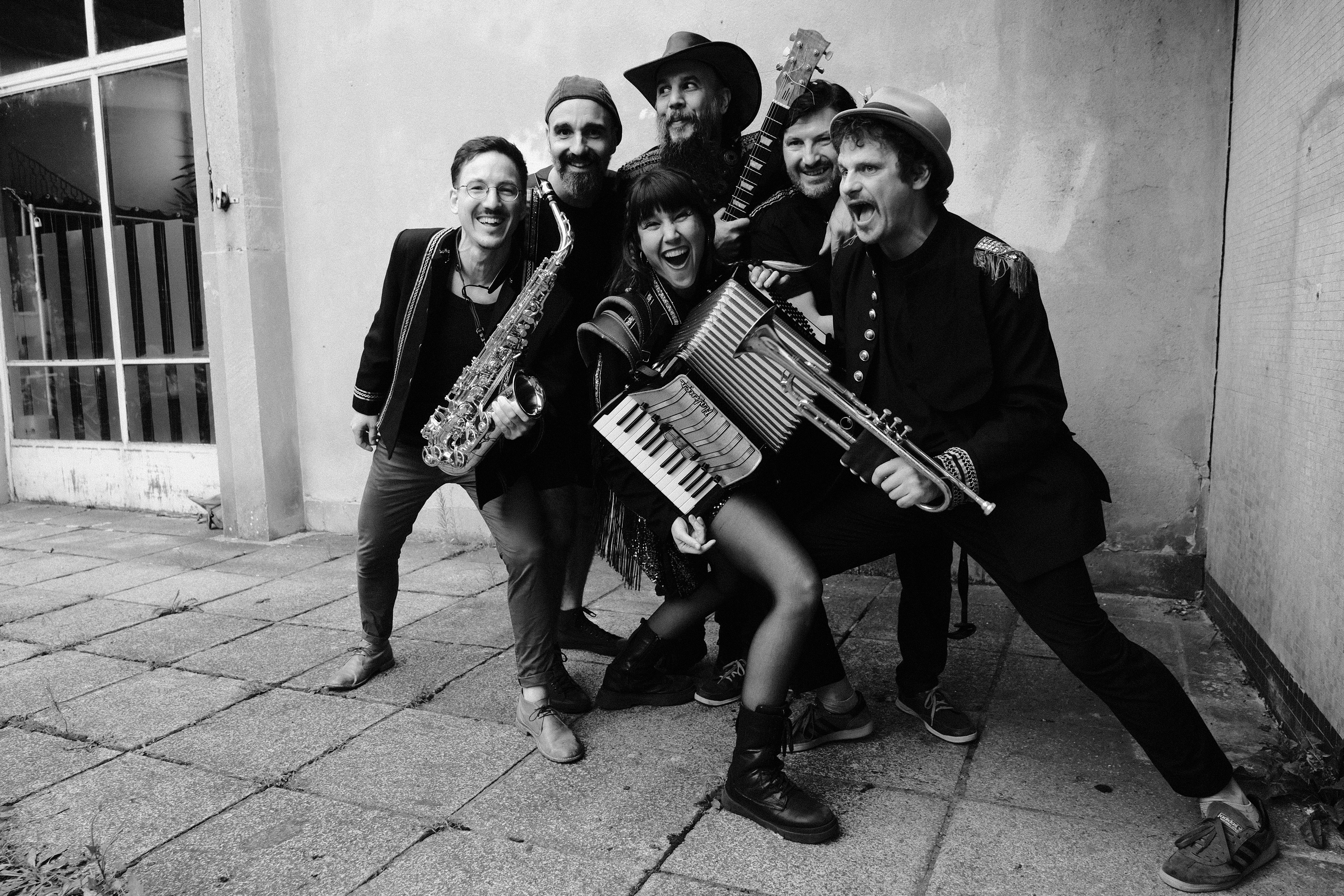
LA FANFARRIA DEL CAPITAN - 2025 (Ph. Alexander Stock )

La Fanfarria del Capitán is an argentinean band formed in 2004 by Victoria Cornejo, Jerónimo Cassagne, and Francisco Mercado. The band created a genre they call Fanfarria Latina, which combines rock, cumbia, ska, Balkan, and Latin rhythms.

They have played around the world, specially in Europe and also in Russia, China, and Japan. They tour every year since 2011 and have been on the road up to 7 months non-stop, a record for independent bands.

Since 2018, the band has gained popularity due to their participation in renown spanish Netflix series La Casa de Papel where they acted in seasons 3 and 4, and their songs "La Flor y el Libro" and "La Palloza", are both part of the original soundtrack. Their version of "Bella Ciao" became also popular thanks to the series.

La Fanfarria del Capitán has released 7 albums and several singles. "Flores del Bosque de Bolonia" (2005), "EViva!" (2013), "Fanfarria Latina on Tour" (2014), "La Giravida" (2016) "Magias de Hoy" (2018), "El Cantomanto" (2022) and "Antologiras" (2025).

== History ==
The band's first album as "Capitan Tifus", was Flores del Bosque de Bolonia (2005), produced by Matías Cella (producer of Kevin Johansen and Jorge Drexler), and edited by EMI Publishing. Their second album was E Viva! (2012). Cella's production was edited in Austria by Newton Records.

In 2007, Capitán participated in the Nokia Trends Artemotion, a televised tour through Argentina. In the same year, Cornejo toured with Mad Professor through the UK and to play together in Madrid and Buenos Aires.

In 2009, the band won the "Diente de Oro" award as a creative band, given by EMI to the most promising projects of the year.

In 2011, they started touring around the world, due to an invitation o the "Botanique Festival" (Bologna, Italia) to represent the music of Buenos Aires. This gave birth to their first international tour, with 40 concerts in Italy, Germany, Czech Republic, Austria and Spain.

The "Mondo Tour 2012" consisted of 87 concerts over seven months through Argentina, Germany, the Netherlands, Sweden, the Czech Republic, Austria, Ukraine, Russia, China and Japan. Important festivals on this tour included the Fusion Festival (Larz, DE), Mighty Sounds (Tabor, CZ), Nuevo Sol (Rostock, DE), Movement Festival (Perm, RUS), Harvest Festival (Moscú, RUS), and OCT-Loft Jazz Festival (Shenzhen, China).

In 2013, their third international tour included Latin America and Europe. The tour started in Buenos Aires with the Pepsi Music Festival and was followed by European festivals such as Trutnov (CZ), Wild Mint (Russia) and Mundial (Belgium). Capitan Tifus played 60 concerts during the five months they were in Europe. They also shared gigs with Bomba Estereo (Lido, Berlin), Karamelo Santo (Die Pumpe, Kiel), and Bersuit Vergarabat (Karneval der Kulturen, Berlin).

In 2014, their fourth tour included Germany, Czech Republic, Austria, Belgium, Netherlands, Finland, Ukraine, Poland, Slovakia, Italy, France and Spain. The most important festivals of this tour were: World Village Festival (Finland), Wutzrock Festival (Hamburg), Karneval der Kulturen (Berlin), Mundial Festival (Tilburg), Trutnov Festival (Trutnov), MIĘDZYNARODOWE ŚWIĘTO (Poland).

The 2016, tour included the festivals Drienok Festival (Slovakia), Jatka Festival y Street Festival (Czech Rep), Transit Festival, Kulturfest Sindelfingen y Tropen Tango (Germany), Vijver Festival and Festival Onderstroom (Netherlands), Zomer Van Antwerpen (Belgium), Bimble Bandada Festival (UK), Dokufest (Kosovo), Finger Food Festival y Ariano Folk Festival (Italy).

In 2017, they toured 6 countries, playing at Tollwood, Grimming & Grantig, Templiner Stadtfest y Pfederstall Festival (Germany), Drienok Festival (Slovakia), FestivalderAa (Netherlands) y Czeremcha open air (Poland).

During 2018, they toured together with Bersuit Vergarabat in Rusia due to the FIFA World Cup and played a concert together at the Central House of Artists of Moscow. The tour continued in 8 European countries and included: Reeds Festival (Switzerland), Mana Festival, Open Air Klagenfurt (Austria), Tropen Tango, Jahr Markt Festival y Binger Open Air (Germany), Pohoda Festival (Slovakia), Babel Sounds (Hungary), Jatka Festival (Czech Republic).

The band continues in constant tour around the world. Even in pandemic times on 2021, they managed to tour 3 months around Europe, with all the corona restrictions, being one the only international band who was still performing, with their main singer Victoria Cornejo pregnant of 7 month.

La Fanfarria del Capitán declared of Cultural Interest by the Secretary of Culture and the Ministry of Foreign Affairs of Argentina.

=== Albums ===
After their debut album, Flores del Bosque de Bolonia, they released a second album also directed by Matías Cella called E Viva!. Recorded at Argentinean musician Lito Vitale's Los Elefantes studios. The album was released in Austria by Newton Records. In 2013, they record a live album at Graz, Austria, which was released in 2014 also by Newton Records.

La Giravida is studio album number four. Produced by Diego Blanco (Los Pericos) and Jerónimo Cassagne, mastered by Eduardo Bergallo (Puro Mastering) it counts with the collaboration of artists: Chotokoeu (Spain), Mate Power (Germany), Kocani Orkestar (Macedonia), Raffaelle Quarta (Italia), Lisa Witt (Alemania), La Cesar Pavón Orquesta (Buenos Aires).

In 2018, the band started recording Magias de Hoy, their fifth album featuring Amsterdam Klezmer Band (Netherlands), Riosentí (México/Argentina), Dejan Lapanja (Slovenia), Bersuit Vergarabat, El Plan de la Mariposa, Mintcho Garramone and Fideo y los del Mondo (Argentina). The album was released in 2020.

In June 2022, the band released El Cantomanto. The album includes Schaumamoi ft. Lenze & der Baum, bavarian songwriter, and Todos mis amigos ft. Valentin Andersen, guitar & singuer from argentinean band, El PLan de la Mariposa.

In 2023 they collaborate with the popular singuer Donald (cantante) McCluskey, in a new version of the Argentinean classic Siempre Fuimos Compañeros, a big hit from the 1970s. Together they filmed a videoclip in Buenos Aires, celebration the union of family and friendship.

During the 2025, the band released a live album, with live versions in different cities and years, within the celebrations of their 20th Anniversary, called Antologiras.

Me la pego igual ft Moska Lorenzo (Los Autenticos Decadentes), new single from the band, first release of their new album.

== Discography ==
Year	Album
2005	Flores del Bosque de Bolonia
2012	E Viva!
2014	Fanfarria Latina on tour
2016	La Giravida
2018	Magias de Hoy
2022	El Cantomanto
2025	Antologiras

== Videography ==
Year	Title	World
2007	Hawaii	Buenos Aires, Ar
2012	Mondo Tour 2012 - LIVE	World
2013	Maradevi	Buenos Aires, Ar
2014	Amor y mucho más	Japan
2014	Tour 2014	Europe
2014	Via Nacionale (feat Kocani Orkestar)	Kocani, Macedonia
2015	Maria	Vagues, Ar
2016	Bella Ciao	Amsterdam, Nl
2018	La Flor y el Libro	Bavaria, De
2018	La Ira del Mar (ft. Amsterdam Klezmer Band)	Amsterdam, Nl
2018	Magias de Hoy (ft. Bersuit Vergarabat	Russia
2019	Casa Okupa)	Berlin, De
2019	La Palloza	Balboa, Es
2020	Bella Ciao / World in Cuarentena	World
2022	Gran Rex (ft. El Plan de la Mariposa)	Burg Klempenow, De
2022	Borobom (ft. Riosenti)	Michoacan & SMDA, Mx & Ar
2022	Canción Gitana (StopMotion)	Berlin, De
2023	Happiness	Wollmerschield, De
2023	Come to Berlin	Berlin, De
2023	Ey Capitan, mi casa tu casa	Buenos Aires, Ar
2023	Better Times	London, Uk
2024	Posadeiro / Glastonbury Festival	Glastonbury, Uk
2024	Plato del dia	Brugge, Be
2024	Cuando volvere a ver el mar?	Baltic Sea, De
2024	Schaumamoi (ft- Lenze & der Baum	Bavaria, De
2024	Siempre Fuimos Compañeros (ft. Donald)	Buenos Aires, Ar
2025	Villa Imperial de Potosi	Animation
2025	Me la Pego Igual (ft Moska Lorenzo)	Buenos Aires, Ar
