= Helsinki Samba Carnaval =

Annual festival in Helsinki, Finland

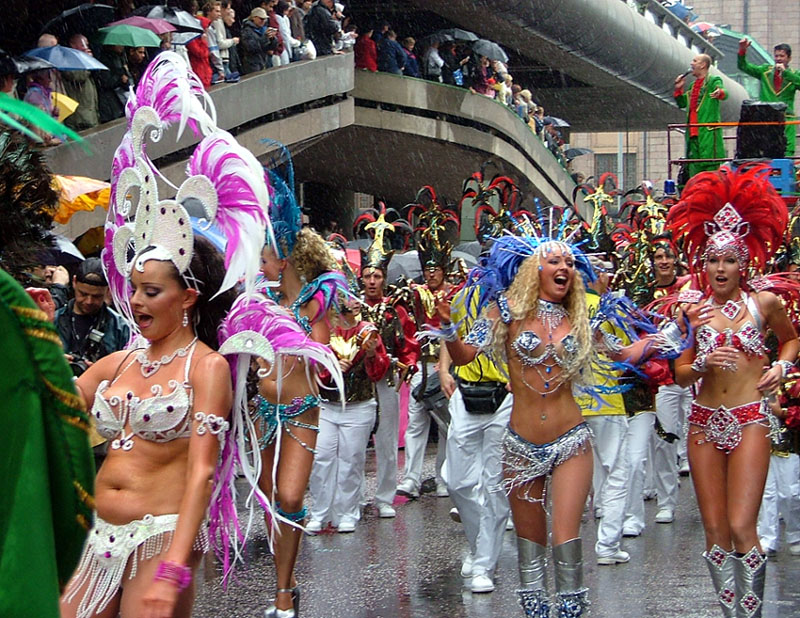
2004 carnival

The Helsinki Samba Carnaval is an annual samba carnival held in Helsinki, the capital of Finland, since 1991. It's considered the largest organized carnival celebration in the nordic countries.

The carnival takes place on the weekend in early to middle June, normally close to the Helsinki Day on 12 June. Unlike the Rio Carnival, it is not possible to hold the carnival in January through March, because like many other places in northern Europe, the outdoor temperature in Helsinki is far too low at that time.

== History ==
The carnival lacks a proper historical tradition. It mostly grew from experimenting and organising, but was still influenced by Brazilian traditions. In 2007, Tarja Halonen, President of Finland at the time, participated in the event.

The organisation responsible for the event is the Finnish Samba School Association (in Finnish: Suomen Sambakoulujen Liitto). It organized the samba carnival for the first time in 1991 in Turku, but since 1993, Helsinki has been established as the official carnival location. The association has been awarded the esteemed Insignia of the Order of Rio Branco by the Federative Republic of Brazil.

== Samba schools ==
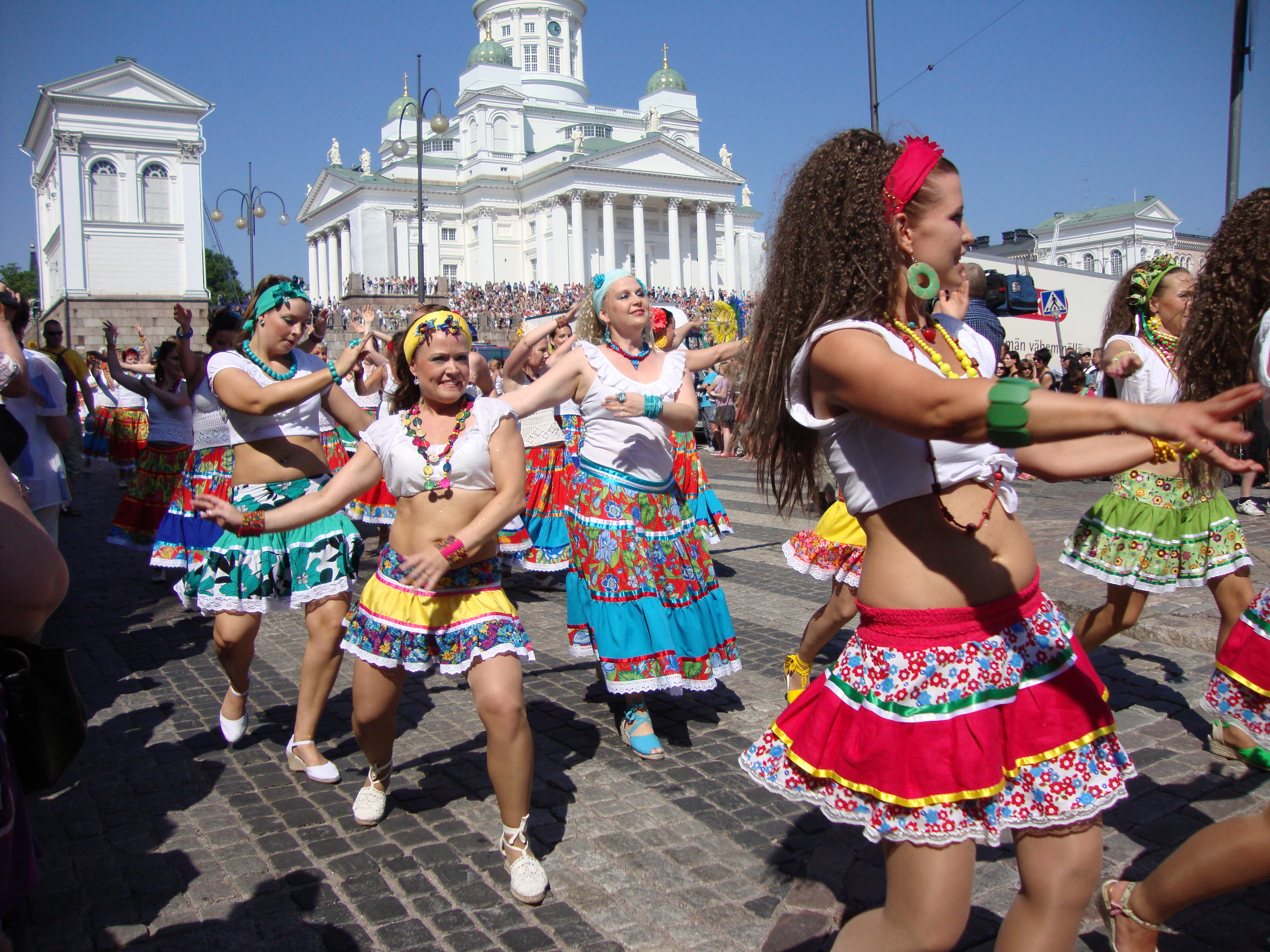
2011 carnival

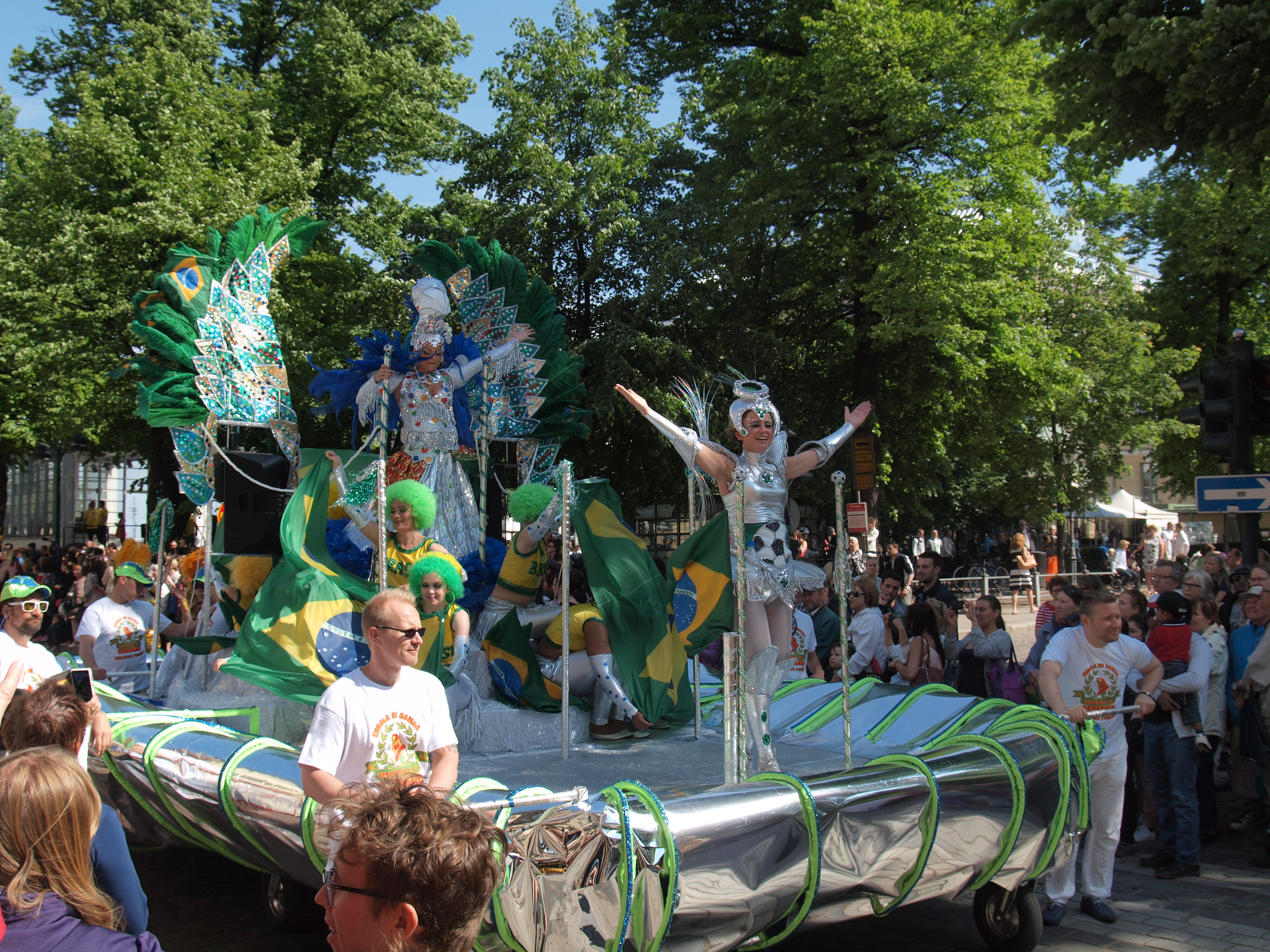
2014 carnival

- Império do Papagaio from Helsinki
- Força Natural also from Helsinki
- Carioca from Turku
- Maracanã from Lahti
- El Gambo from Kokkola
- Tropical from Seinäjoki
- União da Roseira from Tampere
