= Art Centre Salmela =

Coordinates: 61°24.705′N 26°49.650′E

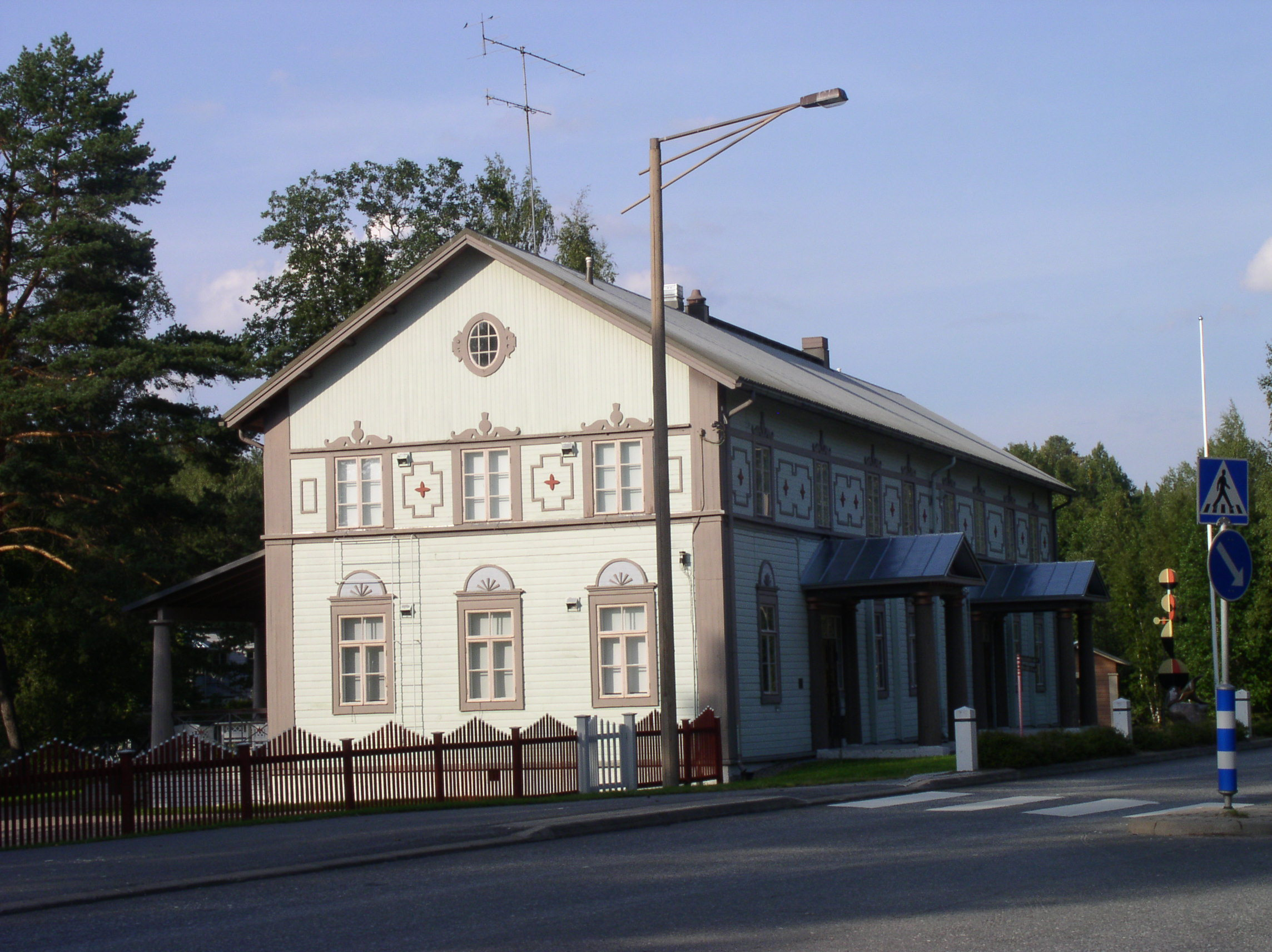
The main building of Art Centre Salmela

Art Centre Salmela is an art centre in Mäntyharju, Finland. It produces every year a multicultural program of art exhibitions, concerts and lectures. It also organizes the Merikanto Singing Competition every fourth year. It is included to Finland Festivals as one of the biggest cultural festivals in Finland.
