= Ii, Finland =

Municipality in North Ostrobothnia, Finland

Ii Ijo
- Municipality
- Iin kunta Ijo kommun
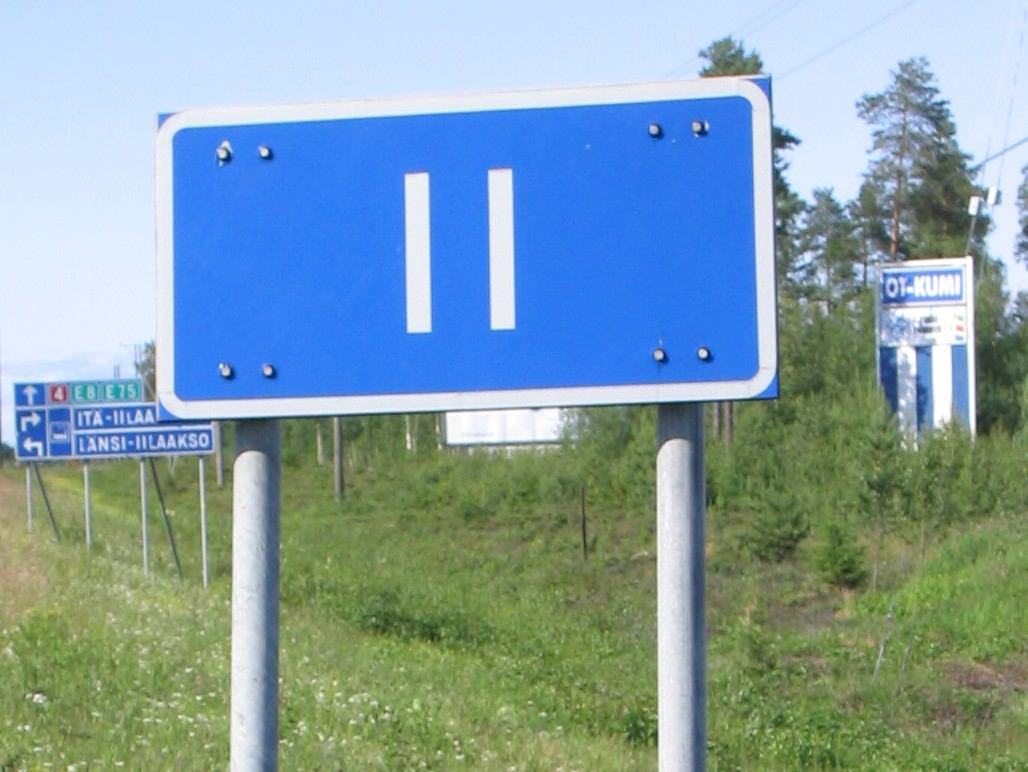
- Roadsign marking the entrance to Ii (in uppercase)

- Coat of arms

- Location of Ii in Finland
- Interactive map of Ii
- Coordinates: 65°19′N 025°22′E
- Country: Finland
- Region: North Ostrobothnia
- Sub-region: Oulunkaari
- Charter: 1445

Government
  - Municipal manager: Ari Alatossava

Area (2018-01-01)
  - Total: 2,872.44 km^{2} (1,109.06 sq mi)
  - Land: 1,615.71 km^{2} (623.83 sq mi)
  - Water: 1,256.69 km^{2} (485.21 sq mi)
  - Rank: 42nd largest in Finland

Population (2025-12-31)
  - Total: 9,755
  - Rank: 98th largest in Finland
  - Density: 6.04/km^{2} (15.6/sq mi)

Population by native language
  - Finnish: 98.7% (official)
  - Swedish: 0.2%
  - Others: 1.1%

Population by age
  - 0 to 14: 22.5%
  - 15 to 64: 56.2%
  - 65 or older: 21.3%
- Time zone: UTC+02:00 (EET)
  - Summer (DST): UTC+03:00 (EEST)
- Website: www.ii.fi/en

Ii (Finnish pronunciation: [iː]; Swedish: Ijo) is a municipality of Finland. It is situated by the Bothnian Bay, at the mouth of river Iijoki, and it is part of the North Ostrobothnia region. The municipality has a population of 9,755 (31 December 2025) and covers an area of 2,872.44 km^{2} (1,109.06 sq mi) of which 1,256.69 km^{2} (485.21 sq mi) is water. The population density is 6.04/km^{2} (15.6/sq mi).

The municipality is unilingually Finnish.

Ii merged with Kuivaniemi on 1 January 2007. The new municipality retained the name Ii, but adopted the coat of arms of Kuivaniemi.

Beginning in 2008, Ii is home to the ART Ii Biennale of Northern Environmental and Sculpture Art, an international art fair.

The city has the ambition to become the first zero waste town in the world, and its municipal manager claims that it does not use fossil fuels for energy.

== Etymology ==
Ii is named after the river Iijoki. The original name of the settlement was Iijoen kylä, first mentioned in 1374 as Yioki when it was a chapel community within the Pedersöre parish. The marketplace Iin Hamina has existed since the 14th century. Ii became a separate parish sometime before 1445.

Ii is notable for having the shortest place name in Finland, and also one of the shortest ones in the world. The etymology is not definitively established; options are either Germanic origin or Sami origin. In the latter, it would mean "a place to stay overnight in"; cf. Northern Sami idja "night".

== History ==
The parish of Ii was originally larger than the modern municipality: it included Pudasjärvi and Taivalkoski until 1639, Kiiminki, Ylikiiminki and Haukipudas until 1858. The municipality of Kuivaniemi was split off in 1919 and Yli-Ii was split off in 1924.

Kuivaniemi became a part of Ii again in 2007. When Yli-Ii was merged into Oulu, a part of it was given to Ii as an exclave. This exclave contains the Pahkakoski hydroelectric power plant.

The Jakkukylä area, transferred from Oulu to Ii in 2018

The village of Jakkukylä and its surroundings, originally part of Yli-Ii and a part of Oulu from 2013, decided to join Ii in 2018.

== Demographics ==
=== Population ===
The municipality has a population of 9,755 (31 December 2025).

Population development 1980–2020
Year	Residents
1980	7,651
1985	7,925
1990	8,246
1995	8,540
2000	8,439
2005	8,868
2010	9,382
2015	9,663
2020	9,834
Source: Statistics Finland The data refers to the conditions on 31 December of the current year according to the territorial division on 1 January 2022.

=== Languages ===
The population by language (mother tongue) on 31 December 2022. Finnish (suomi), Swedish (ruotsi) and Sami (saame) count as indigenous languages as they have official status in the country. The rest of the languages are counted as foreign. For languages with fewer than 10 speakers, the figure is hidden by Statistics Finland due to confidentiality reasons.

Language	Speakers in 2022	
Language	Quantity	Part (%)
Total population	9,853	100.0
Official languages	9,774	99.2
Finnish	9,757	99.0
Swedish	16	0.2
Sami	1	0.0
Foreign languages	79	0.8
Russian	27	0.3
Other	52	0.5

Population by native language
1. Finnish (99.0%)
2. Swedish (0.20%)
3. Sami (0.00%)
4. Other (0.80%)

== Politics ==
=== Municipal council ===
Distribution of mandates in Ii municipality, elections of 1976–2021 years.

== Notable people ==
- Juhamatti Aaltonen, ice hockey player
- Pekka Ahmavaara, politician and father of politician Arvi Ahmavaara
- Liisa Hyssälä, politician
- Hannu Järvenpää, ice hockey player and coach
- Tanja Kari, Paralympic gold medalist in cross-country skiing
- Fanni Luukkonen, chairman of Lotta Svärd
- Leo Skurnik, physician
