= Helsinki Pride =

Annual LGBT event in Helsinki, Finland

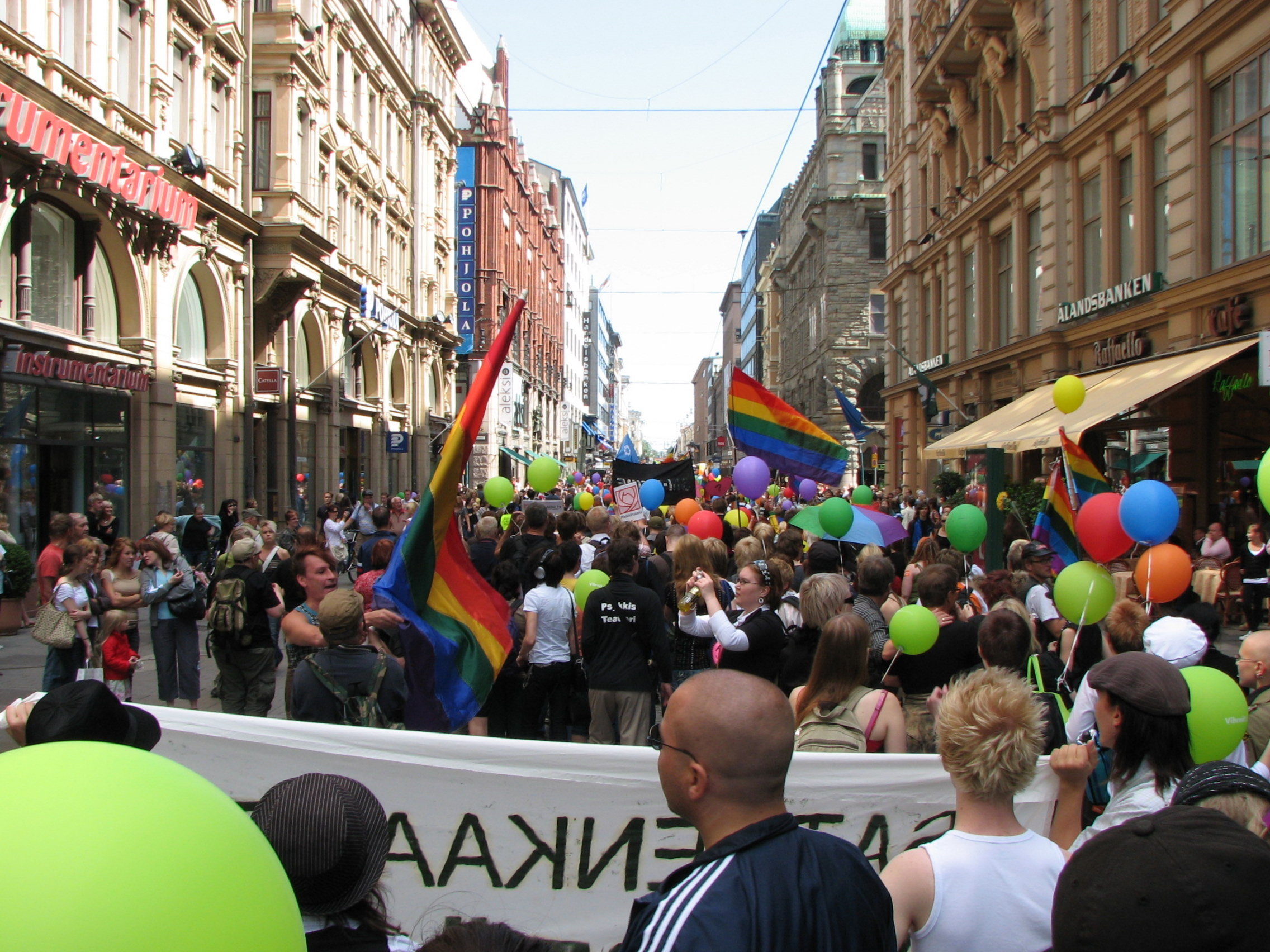
Helsinki Pride 2007 parade on Aleksanterinkatu.

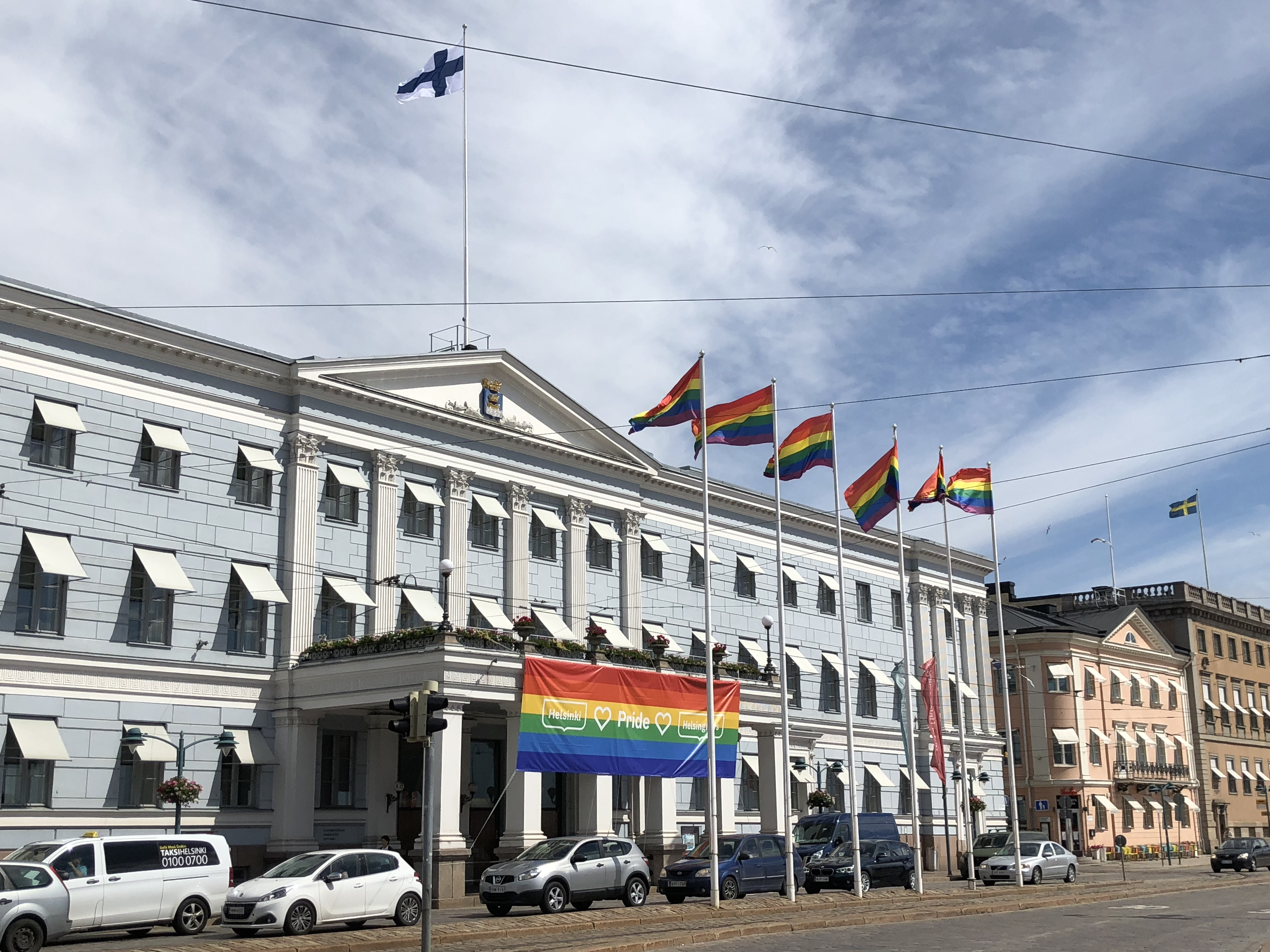
Helsinki City Hall during Helsinki Pride in 2018.

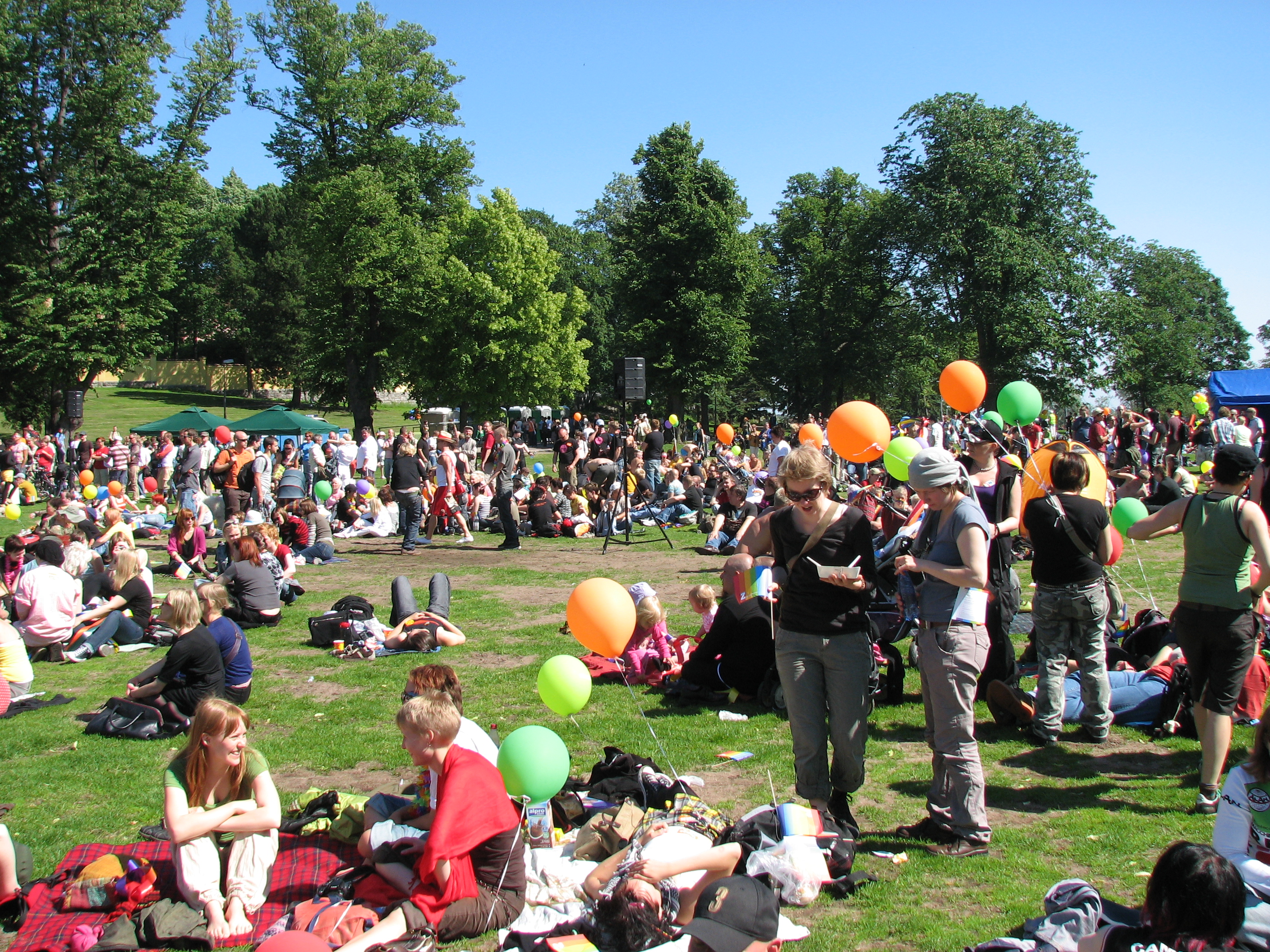
Helsinki Pride 2007 event in Kaivopuisto.

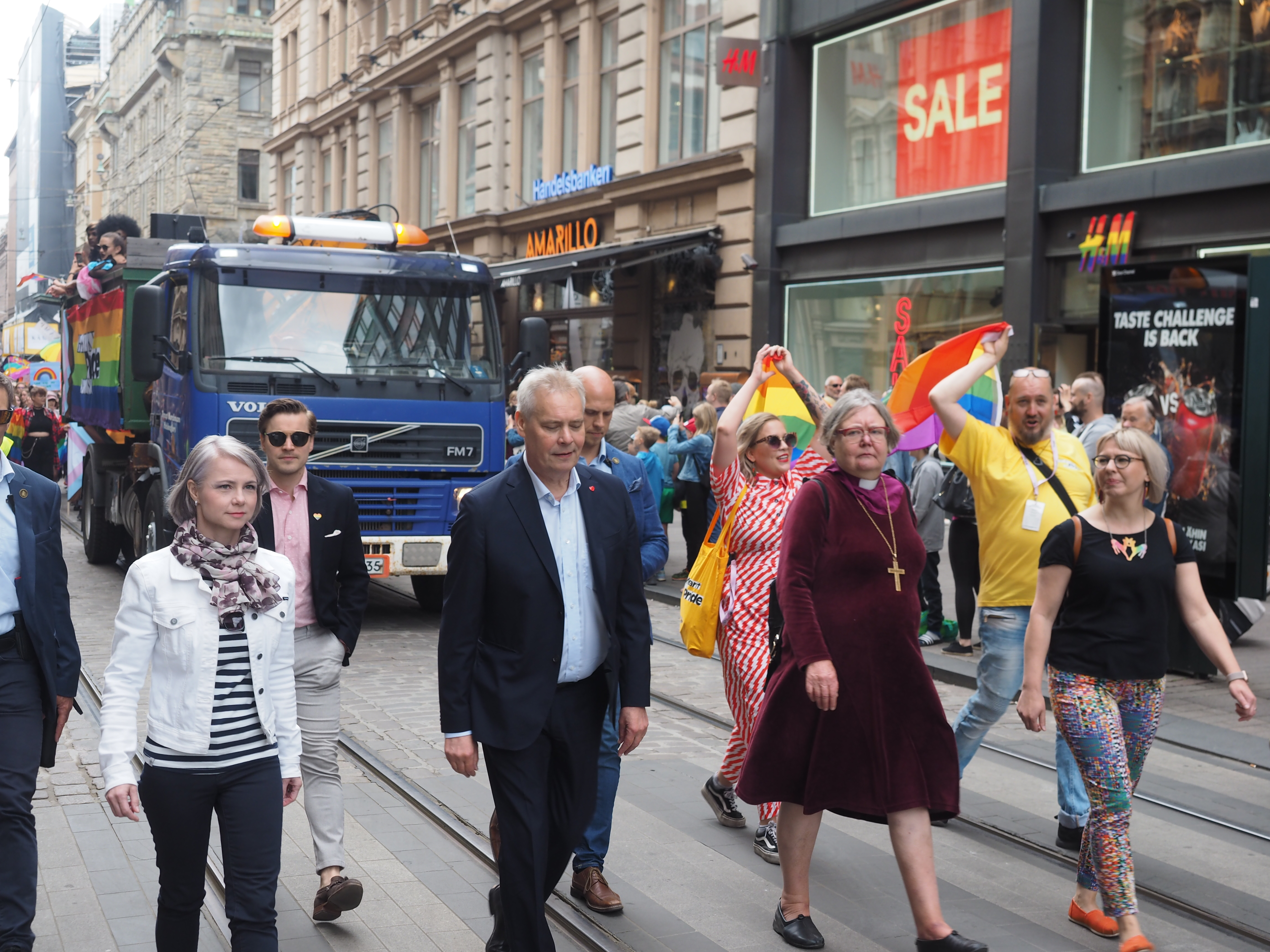
Helsinki Pride 2019 was attended by Prime Minister Antti Rinne and former Bishop of Helsinki Irja Askola.

Helsinki Pride is an LGBT pride event in Helsinki, Finland. The event takes place during the last week of June.

The purpose of Helsinki Pride is to remind people that equal rights belong to everyone regardless of sexual orientation or gender. The word "pride" in the event's name comes from the purpose of participants to proudly represent themselves.

Helsinki Pride is the biggest sexual minority event in Finland. In 2018, 2019, 2023, 2024 and 2025 there were about 100 thousand participants in the Helsinki Pride parade according to the Finnish police, and as a public event, the parade is one of the biggest events in the history of Finland.

The event is a week-long event that takes place the week after Midsummer. The week begins with the opening of the program on Monday, and includes various sporting events, a youth gathering, and a Rainbow Fair throughout the week. In addition, the week culminates with Saturday's Pride parade, which runs through the heart of Helsinki, celebrating the role of women and LGBTQ+ culture. The procession ends in the park where the celebrations continue, with live music and speeches. Saturday night is also a time for revelry at the city's gay nightclub.

In 2018, attendance at the Helsinki Pride week reached a record-breaking 100,000 people, nearly triple the previous year's numbers. This made it one of the largest public events ever held in Finland.

== History ==
The Helsinki Pride is a continuation of Seta's "Freedom Day" tradition, which began in 1975. The Pride was originally held in Helsinki in even years and in other major Finnish cities in odd years. Since 2006, it has been held every year in Helsinki. Also, other major Finnish cities have organized prides of their own, including Tampere Pride, North Pride in Oulu and Lahti Pride.

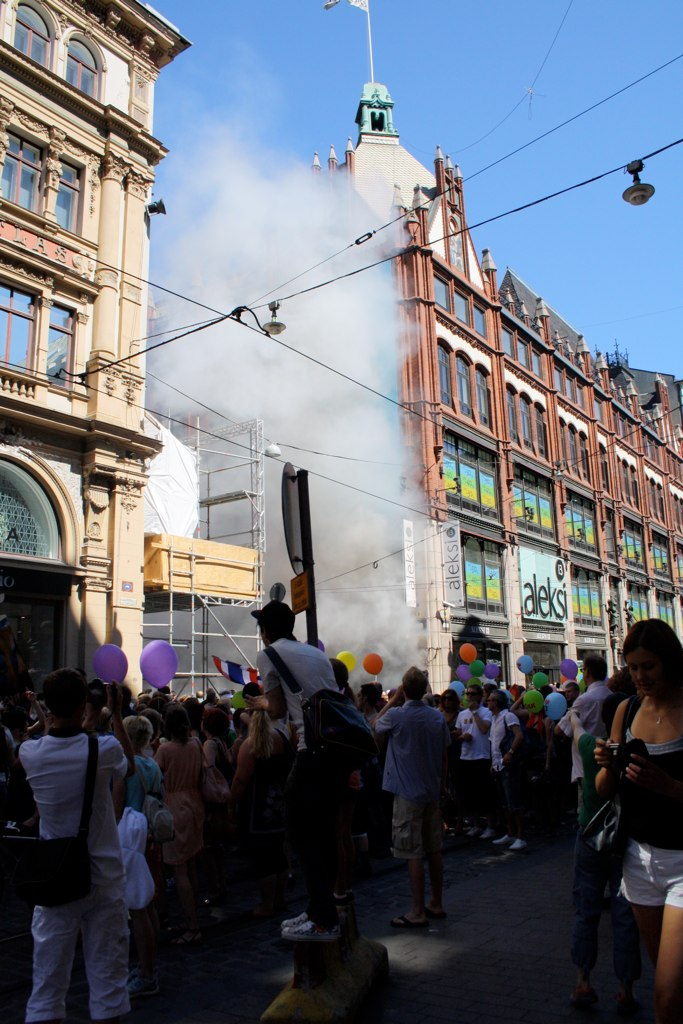
In 2010 there was a gas attack against the Helsinki Pride parade.

The 2010 Helsinki Pride parade was disrupted at the corner of the streets Aleksanterinkatu and Kluuvikatu by a tear gas and pepper spray attack, resulting in injuries to several people, including a child under 1 year old. Three men were later arrested for their involvement in the attack. The police arrested three men for the hate crime. They were sentenced to four years in prison with parole and damage reparations. The accused men denied the motive for the crime being the sexual orientation of the victims. Some of the victims have suffered from mental problems long after the attack.

In 2013 a small group of people opposing human rights for rainbow people and the Helsinki Pride organised a Hetero Pride event. Attendees at the event included more people opposing the Hetero Pride event than its actual participants.

In 2014 the number of participants in the Helsinki Pride parade had grown to 20 thousand people. In 2016 and 2017 there were 35 thousand participants.

At the 2016 parade the petty officer Juho Pylvänäinen from the Turku coast guard in the Finnish Navy participated in the Helsinki Pride parade in full uniform. Henrik Gahmberg, the spokesman for the Finnish Defence Forces, commented on Pylvänäinen's appearance at Helsinki Pride: "We do not find it necessary or permissible that an individual soldier should appear in military uniform on their free time in such an event, because that causes an image of the Defence Forces to be made based on the soldier's behaviour and appearance". Jan Engström, the information commander of the Finnish Defence Forces, said that Gahmberg's statement had been unnecessarily strict and been based on a view that the Helsinki Pride were a demonstration when the police has classified it as a public event. According to the code of the Finnish Defence Forces a soldier must not appear in military uniform at public events or demonstrations. According to the new code that came into force at the start of the year 2017 that the use of a military uniform on free time is not appropriate at events similar to demonstrations.

In 2018 the Helsinki Pride parade nearly tripled its number of participants. According to an estimate by the police, a hundred thousand people took part in the parade; more than Lordi's concert at the Helsinki Market Square celebrating their victory at the Eurovision Song Contest 2006. The 2018 Helsinki Pride was one of the largest public events in the history of Finland and the largest singular public demonstration ever held in Finland.

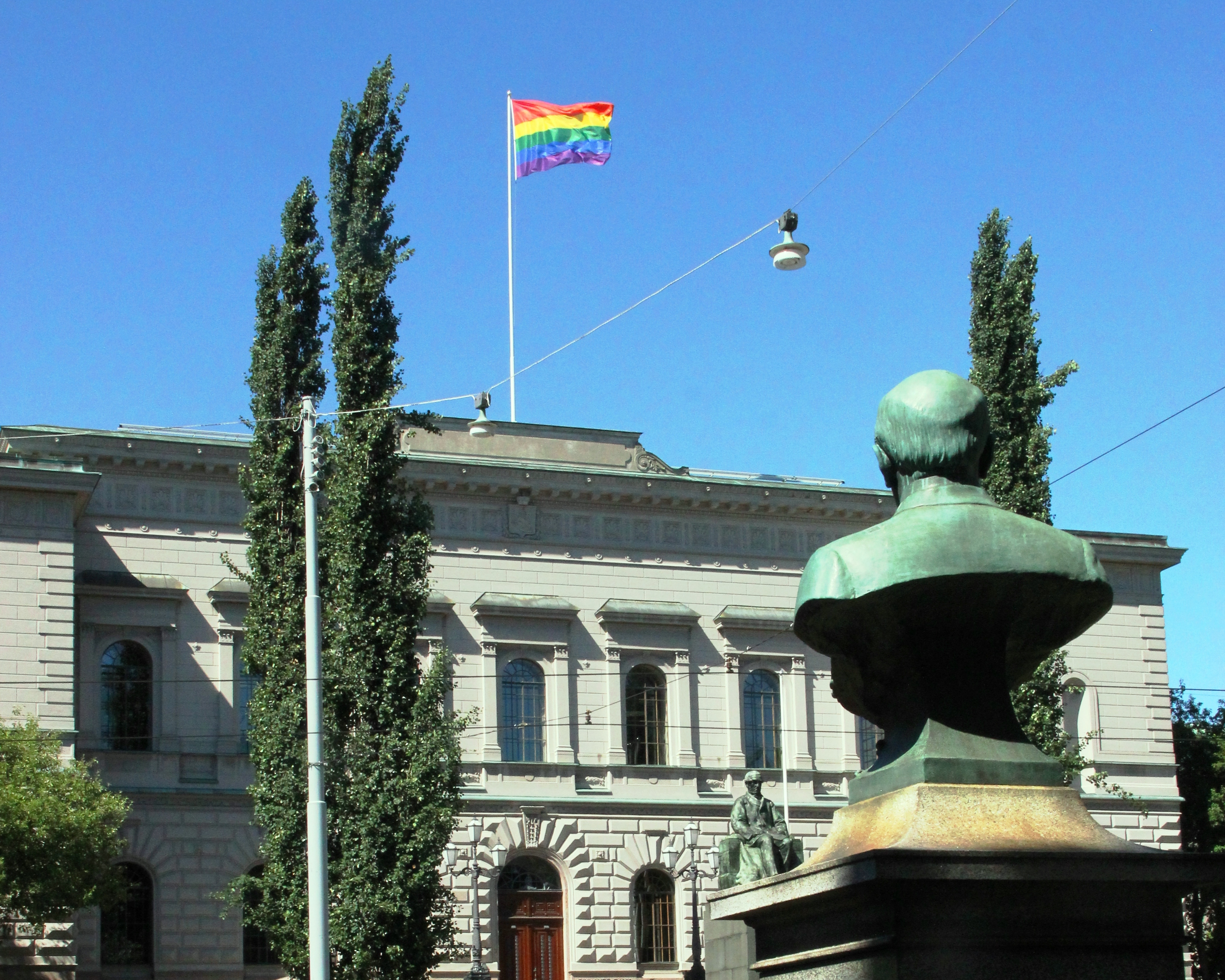
The Bank of Finland hoisted a rainbow flag at the 2022 Pride week.

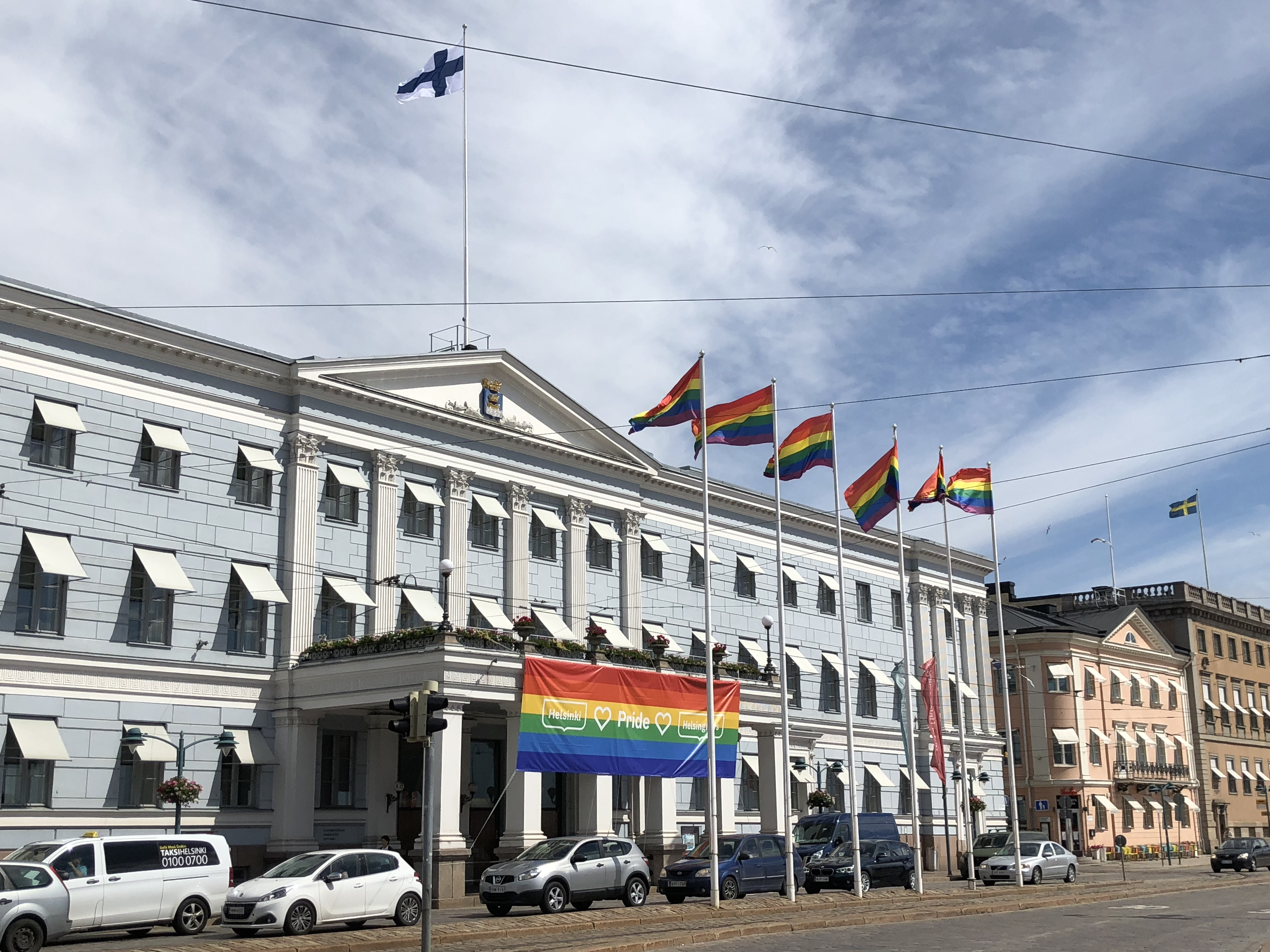
The Helsinki City Hall flying a rainbow flag in June 2018.

In 2019 the parade once again had one hundred thousand participants. For the first time, the parade was attended by Prime Minister of Finland Antti Rinne.

In 2020 the event was exceptionally only held in September and the great parade was not held because of the COVID-19 pandemic in Finland. The Prime Minister of the Finland was appointed as the official protector of the event for the first time. The rainbow flag was also hoisted at the palace of the Government of Finland for the first time. Prime Minister Sanna Marin agreed to serve as the event's official protector also in 2021. The parade was also called off in 2021, and so the 2022 parade was the first parade in three years.

== Program ==
The event lasts for the entire week and is usually held on the week after Midsummer. The opening ceremony is on Monday and the week consists of exhibitions, sports and discussion events, peer group meetings, evenings for the youth and the rainbow mass. There are various events ranging from punk subculture clubs to women's parties during the Pride week.

The week culminates in the Pride parade on Saturday, marching through the entire centre of Helsinki. The parade ends in a park where a park celebration is held. This celebration includes musical performances and speeches and Seta giving the "Apple of factual information" and "Honorary rat" awards. Saturday evening is the main celebration day for the Pride week.

== Criticism about partnership pinkwashing ==
Many of Helsinki Pride's partners have been accused of pinkwashing. The Pride movement started from the 1969 Stonewall riots in the United States which were caused by systematic oppression of sexual minorities by the police and authorities. Taking into account the history of the Pride movement and even the current attitude of some institutions towards minorities, the participation of some parties has evoked feelings of pinkwashing. The Finnish Immigration Service withdrew its participation in 2017 because of heavy criticism.

In 2019 one of the main partners of Helsinki Pride was, for the first time, the Evangelical Lutheran Church of Finland, which divided opinions both in the church and in the LGBTQ community. Resignation from the church through the website Eroakirkosta.fi momentarily grew because of the partnership. In the next year, the Evangelical Lutheran Church was no longer an official partner of Helsinki Pride.

In 2023 Helsinki Pride withdrew from partnership with the National Coalition Party and the Centre Party. The reason was that some of the members of parliament from these parties had voted against the redesign of the law about transsexual people in the parliament.

The organisation Trans RY which supports rights for sexual minorities no longer wants to be a partner of Helsinki Pride because of the pinkwashing. In 2024 Trans RY published an open letter criticising the partners as well as having the National Coalition Party as a partner even though the party's program does not mention support for rights of sexual minorities at all.

== See also ==
- Vinokino
