= IHME Contemporary Art Festival =

IHME Contemporary Art Festival (between 2009-2018), since year 2019 known as IHME Helsinki is a contemporary art organization maintained by Pro Arte Foundation Finland, and supported by Kone Foundation, Saastamoinen Foundation and Abakanowicz Arts and Culture Charitable Foundation (until 2025). Between years 2009 and 2018 the festival included a public work of art, a varied programme of events around the artwork, and educational art projects. IHME Project, commissioned by the Festival, was realised in the public realm. A varied Festival programme ranging from artist talks to film screenings opened the IHME Project for discussion and debate and was free to attend. IHME also offered an art education programme, IHME School, with various activities. The word "ihme" means a wonder or a miracle in Finnish.

In 2019 the contemporary art festival changed its name as IHME Helsinki (also IHME) and re-organized its activities to become an organization that situates its activities in a dialogue between art, science and climate work. IHME’s core activity is still the annual staging of a new artwork, together with an artist and Finnish and foreign partners, in public space in Finland and abroad. IHME’s goal is to promote eco-social education, a sustainable, democratic society, and a good life on many levels. Due to the changes in operation the festival event has been abandoned and speaking programs and events are now organized all year round.

Pro Arte Foundation Finland seeks to promote art as a resource for democratic society, and as an important part of human life and everyday existence. The Foundation's aim is to enhance the status and visibility of visual art, to improve the relationship between visual art and the public, and to make it more accessible. The Foundation's work is international in scope and directed at anyone interested in culture. The advisory board of IHME invites the artist to conceive the project, and also plans the other programme. Until year 2019 the advisory board of the foundation was: fi:Tuula Arkio (chair), fi:Leevi Haapala, Hanna Johansson, Paula Toppila, and Timo Valjakka. The current advisory board includes Ute Meta Bauer, Hanna Guttorm, Maria Lind, Antti Majava and Paula Toppila as the chair of the board.

== IHME Helsinki Commission ==
Each year, Pro Arte Foundation Finland invites an internationally recognized visual artist or group of artists to make a temporary work of art in public space. The way the IHME Helsinki Commission is to be carried out, along with its form and location, are jointly determined by the Foundation and the selected artist. The admission of the commissioned art work is always free of charge and open to all.

== IHME Festival ==
A varied Festival programme aimed to increase interest in the visual arts and to deepen the public's relationship to it. The programme ranged from talks related to the IHME Project and other topical issues to film screenings and other types of public programming including music and workshops, varying from year to year. Speakers contributing to the programme of talks included artists, also including the Festival artist, as well as academics and professionals from different fields.

== IHME Publications ==
IHME publications documented the events of the annual festival as a digital online publication.

== IHME School ==
IHME School consisted of educational art projects and workshops. The Festival collaborated with schools and universities, as well as The City of Helsinki Youth Division, and produced programmes for different target groups to make contemporary art more accessible.

== History ==
=== IHME Helsinki Commission 2025 ===
The IHME Helsinki Commission 2025 was a series of works titled The Forest by Ukrainian artist Zhanna Kadyrova. The project was presented at the Voimala Museum in Vanhankaupunginkoski, Helsinki, from August 24 to October 2, 2025.In the work, Kadyrova addressed the history of the Kakhovka Dam—destroyed in Russian war of aggression on June 6, 2023—and the Zaporizhzhia region, as well as the consequences of the destruction and the forest growing on the site of the former reservoir. The work consisted of video footage shot by the artist in the forest and camera obscura images, as well as archival material obtained from the Dovzhenko Center: texts, videos, and photographs. Over the course of six weeks, the work was viewed by 2,155 visitors. Zhanna Kadyrova (b. 1981) is an internationally acclaimed artist who, in 2025, became the first woman in twenty years to receive the Taras Shevchenko National Prize, Ukraine’s state award for the visual arts. Following the Helsinki exhibition, The Forest was on view in Bialystok, Poland, at Galeria Arsenal as part of Kadyrova’s Avulsion exhibition from December 5, 2025, to February 15, 2026, and in Berlin, Germany, at the Kunstraum Kreutzberg/Bethanien as part of the Echoes of Tumult group exhibition from January 23 to March 22, 2026. Art Center Zaporizhzhia organized a screening of the videos on December 18, 2025.

=== IHME Helsinki Commission 2024 ===
The IHME Helsinki Commission 2024 was the Maaleipä Challenge by the artist duo Cooking Sections. The project challenged everyone from home bakers to professional chefs to develop new bread recipes that benefit the wellbeing of the soil, waterways, and the human gut. Maaleipä is Finnish and refers to bread for the soil. The challenge began in April 2024 and concluded in September 2024 with the Maaleipä Feast. The Maaleipä Feast featured 14 finalist recipes, six of which received awards. The challenge’s finalist recipes were published on the website maaleipa.fi. Cooking Sections is an internationally acclaimed artist duo consisting of artists Daniel Fernández Pascual and Alon Schwabe. The Maaleipä Challenge was carried out as part of their long-term CLIMAVORE research and action platform, which examines how we should eat as humans change the climate.

=== IHME Helsinki Commission 2023 ===
IHME Helsinki Commission 2023 was Chicago Boys - While We Were Singing, They Were Dreaming initiated by Kurdish artist and musician Hiwa K. In the commission a diverse group of people formed an amateur band and practiced together twice a week for six weeks between 17 April and 27 May 2023. The band consisted of musicians and non-musicians who are united by the desire to play music and to think about the connections between the neoliberal economy and environmental changes to everyday life. The band practice privately in Stoa Cultural Center and publicly in various location around the city of Helsinki. The locations of public rehearsals are all threatened by neoliberal values and urban planning aiming for continuous growth: Lapinlahti Hospital, Puhos Shopping Center, the forests of Riistavuori, Matokallio and Stansvik. In the rehearsals people could share stories of these places and play music together. In each public rehearsal a specialist introduced the location to the band and other participants of the event. The last public rehearsal was held in Stoa Cultural Center on 27 May 2023.

Chicago Boys - While We Were Singing, They Were Dreaming was initiated by Hiwa K in 2010 in London's Serpentine gallery and since then it has been experienced in numerous art organization around the world.

=== IHME Helsinki Commission 2022 ===
IHME Commission 2022 was an online course created by Indian artist Amar Kanwar. A ten week long online course Learning from Doubt is based on and emerges from the art installation and exhibition, The Sovereign Forest, by Kanwar. The Sovereign Forest, is an art project that has been ongoing since 2009. It has been evolving, expanding and experimenting with different forms and presentations, and has been made in collaboration with Samadrusti/Sudhir Pattnaik and Sherna Dastur. Samadrusti is a fortnightly Odia political and social news magazine, Sudhir Pattnaik is the editor of Samadrusti and a social activist. Sherna Dastur is a graphic designer and filmmaker based in Delhi. The online course was free of charge and open for all but needed registration. The course happened between 15 February and 3 May 2022.

The course ended with first ever public screening of Amar Kanwar's films in Helsinki on 4 May 2022. The screening was free of charge and open for all, also for the ones who had not participated in the course. The screening included three films from Kanwar: A Season Outside (1997), The Face (2004) and Such a Morning (2017).

Since 2022 the course has taken place also in Nepal at the Photo Kathmandu Festival in spring 2023. The course is happening again in collaboration with University of Helsinki and the Academy of Fine Arts of The University of Arts Helsinki in September-October 2023.

=== IHME Helsinki Commission 2021 ===
IHME Commission 2021 was To Burn, Forest, Fire by Scottish artist Katie Paterson. To Burn, Forest, Fire consisted of the scent of the first-ever forest on earth and the scent of the last forest of the age of climate crisis, made into incense and then burned across a variety of sites around the city of Helsinki in 1-30 September and 1 October, 2021. In connection to the art work there was a booklet published to present the scientific research behind the definitions of the forests and the scents. Essay in the booklet is written by Professor David Haskell. To Burn, Forest, Fire incense ceremonies happen around the world as part of World Weather Network during 21 June 2022 and 21 June 2023.

=== IHME Helsinki Commission 2020 ===
The first IHME Commission in 2020 was the site-specific sound installation Listening Through the Dead Zones by the Norwegian artist Jana Winderen at the Rowing Stadium in Helsinki. Winderen created the installation in collaboration with Tony Myatt. On the shore of the Baltic Sea, at the Rowing Stadium in Helsinki, the audience was able to listen to different species of mammals, including humans, and to various species of fish and crustacea inhabiting the Ocean. Winderen has been investigating how human activity is influencing the dead zones in the Baltic Sea and similar environments close to shores and in lakes. Due to COVID-19 pandemic the installation was postponed to summer 2021. The installation was open to all to visit between 6 - 24 August 2021. An online version of the sound work is available as part of World Weather Network at IHME Helsinki's weather station between 21 June 2022 and 21 June 2023.

=== Ihme Contemporary Art Festival 2018 ===
The IHME Project 2018, film entitled THE BEETLE, was conceived by the Swedish artist Henrik Håkansson. The False Click Beetle (Hylochares cruentatus) is an endangered insect that lives on the old Mätäoja riverbed in Vantaa, Finland. Håkansson's movie was screened on both days of the festival that took place on May 25–26 May 2018 in Korjaamo Culture Factory, Helsinki.

The tenth IHME Festival included also other films and video art, talks and music. The festival featured a sound art project The Band of Weeds and singer-songwriter Sofia Jannok. The questions of art and ecology were discussed, among others, by director, playwright and writer Juha Hurme, Professor Jyrki Muona and Academy Research Fellow Marjo Saastamoinen. The programme included also other discussions on the IHME Project and on creating and curating art to the public space.

IHME Festival arranged programme also in endangered beetle's habitat in Myyrmäki, Vantaa between June 1–10, 2018. This part of the programme included screenings of Håkansson's film, workshops and guided tours. IHME audience workers also cycled around the area and gave information about the IHME Project, the beetle and the nature of the area.

The 2018 IHME Project THE BEETLE will be viewable internationally at Yle Areena, Finland's national streaming service, until May 2019.

=== Ihme Contemporary Art Festival 2017 ===
The IHME Project artist 2017 Theaster Gates brought to Helsinki his experimental musical ensemble, The Black Monks of Mississippi. The group, founded and led by Gates, offered to Helsinki audience a journey of exploration into the power of the voice and into the potential of improvisation. Gates's body of works titled The Black Charismatic took place 5–29 April 2017 and consisted of: a film shown at the Finnkino Tennispalatsi cinema; a live concert at the Rock Church; a video installation shown in the Finnish Salvation Army Temple; and the release of a three-LP recording.

The new venue for the programme of talks and films was the Gloria Cultural Arena. The two-day event tackled themes emerging from Gates's practice: the meaning of art and cultural appropriation. Under discussion were also themes raised by Hannah Arendt’s thinking. Two series of films screened at the Festival mirrored Gates’s production.

=== Ihme Contemporary Art Festival 2016 ===
The main stage for the IHME Project 2016 was a Helsinki icon: the tram. The work was commissioned from the Czech artist Kateřina Šedá, who invited street musicians to perform on all Helsinki tram routes on March 16–19. During its four days, the Tram Buskers’ Tour provided more than 300 hours of live music and reached a total of nearly 24,000 tram passengers.

The Tour featured artists from both Finland and abroad, including: Antti Tolvi; Bence Boka; Chano; DVA; EntreCuerdas; The Entropies; Hermanni Turkki; Hester & Holly Rose; Kaikuluotain; Kiiora; Mario Parizek; PAM; Sagolik; SAffrAn; The Space Lady; Stephen Paul Taylor; Steve Aruni and Funky Monkeys; Sybren Renema; TBeeGirls; and Whale On.

The main Festival Partners were Helsinki City Transport and Helsinki Region Transport.

There were more than 1100 visitors to the IHME Days over the weekend of April 1–3. The themes of the programme of talks were: communities and art; connections between art and education, especially phenomenon-centred learning; and the question of what artists do when they create art. Marie-Louise Ekman’s art exhibition was new to the programme: a series of the artist’s prints produced by Tensta Konsthall in Stockholm was on view throughout the weekend.

=== Ihme Contemporary Art Festival 2015 ===
The British artist Jeremy Deller designed the Ihme Project 2015 entitled Do Touch. In this new work, the public had a chance to inspect objects from the collections of Helsinki’s historical museums for a week in March 2015. The artist selected the objects together with the staff of the collaborating museums. The staff members were trained to give further information on the objects and the time period they were used. The project was realised in partnership with the following museums in Helsinki: Customs Museum, Design Museum, Finnish Museum of Natural History, Helsinki City Museum, Military Museum, Museum of Technology and National Museum of Finland.

Ihme Festival’s talks programme dealt with the themes of the current Ihme Project. At the core of this year’s public commission by Jeremy Deller were the following: the past in the present; the object as a mediator of information and experience; and the artist as curator. The last theme was aimed at contemporary-art professionals. Ihme also discussed other topical subjects: the fragmentation of the media in the Internet age, and the multi-dimensional way in which the art of curating manifests itself in the field of visual art.

=== Ihme Contemporary Art Festival 2014 ===
The Ihme Project 2014 was created by the Israeli artist Yael Bartana. The project under the title True Finn – Tosi suomalainen was a communal experiment. Participants living in Finland and coming from different ethnic, religious and political backgrounds took part. Participants went through tasks that deal with cultural differences but also similarities. The project was compiled as a video art work. The film’s premiere was on March 31, 2014 at the Bio Rex cinema in Helsinki.

The Ihme Days 2014 took place at the Old Student House in Helsinki April 4–6, 2014. Festival’s discussions, films, club and workshops centred on themes of national identity and multiculturalism.

=== Ihme Contemporary Art Festival 2013 ===
The Ihme Project artist 2013 was the Polish artist Miroslaw Balka Miroslaw Balka with Signals. It was an art project carried out together with Helsinki residents during four days, 4–7 April 2013. Miroslaw Balka wanted to give the time and space in his artwork to the residents of Helsinki, and to their most important questions. Each event started with the questions signaled in the urban space using semaphore-flag signals, after which an open discussion of the topics began. Residents, politicians and experts participated equally in the discussions.

Ihme Days 2013 took place 11–14 April 2013 at the Old Student House in Helsinki. The theme of the Days was the art's potential to function as catalyst for change.

Ihme Publication 2013 was a part of Miroslaw Balka's artwork, consisting of two advertisements in the Metro newspaper on 27 September 2012 and 21 March 2013.

=== Ihme Contemporary Art Festival 2012 ===
In the year 2012 The Heart Archive by the French artist Christian Boltanski expanded the scope of the IHME Contemporary Art Festival to four Finnish cities. The project was staged simultaneously in Helsinki, Joensuu, Rovaniemi, and Vaasa during 12 March - 1 April 2012. Each installation of The Heart Archive takes the form of a space where recordings are made of human heartbeats. The heartbeats have been collected since 2008 from all over the world to an archive on Teshima island in Japan.

Themes for the IHME Days 2012 were collecting and the archive. The Days took place at the Old Student House in Helsinki 23–25 March 2012.

Christian Boltanski's IHME Edition was published in newspapers as a series of advertisements published in the four newspapers: Pohjalainen (Vaasa), Karjalainen (Joensuu), Lapin Kansa (Rovaniemi) and NYT (the weekly supplement of Helsingin Sanomat, Helsinki).

=== Ihme Contemporary Art Festival 2011 ===
The Danish artists' group Superflex installation created for the Ihme Contemporary Art Festival 2011 was a film and sculpture titled Modern Times Forever in front of the Stora Enso Building in Helsinki 23 March - 2 April 2011. The film was shown in Helsinki Market Square on a 40m² LED screen, so that one could see the original building simultaneously with the building in the film. The film lasted over ten days and could be watched 24 hours a day. The movie is one of the longest films in the world.

The Ihme Days 2011 were held at the Old Student House in Helsinki 1–3 April 2011. The themes of the festival derived from the IHME Project 2011 and were the time, the city and the future.

=== Ihme Contemporary Art Festival 2010 ===
The Ihme Project 2010 was the sound installation When Day Closes designed by the Scottish artist Susan Philipsz for the Helsinki Central Railway Station. The artwork was presented 12 March - 11 April 2011. In the work the artist performs unaccompanied The Song of My Heart (Sydämeni laulu) composed by Jean Sibelius to a poem by Aleksis Kivi.

The Ihme Days 2011 were held 26–28 March 2010 at the Old Student House in Helsinki. The themes were sound as art work and art in public space.

Ihme Edition 2010 was Free Shop by Superflex. The artwork takes place in an ordinary shop. Anything purchased in the shop by any given customer is free of charge. Free Shop was realized during September 2010 - March 2011.

=== Ihme Contemporary Art Festival 2009 ===
British sculptor Antony Gormley was the artist to conceive the first Ihme Project in 2009. Gormley created a work called Clay and the Collective Body in the Kaisaniemi sports field in Helsinki, bringing together clay and Helsinki locals in a specially erected pneumatic building. The artwork was realized in two phases. In the first phase 22–24 March 2009 the public was allowed to view the constructed clay cube. In the second phase 25 March - 3 April 2009, the public had an opportunity to work on and with the clay and to use it to make objects of any kind. The work took place in four-hour sessions, with about 2,000 participants.

The first Ihme Days were held at the Old Student House in Helsinki 3–5 April 2009. The themes of the days were who makes art and who is art made for.

The second Ihme Edition was a video work After Closedown by the artist Susan Philipsz that had its premiere at YLE Teema TV Channel on September 24, 2009. In the video, the artist sings the themes of two movies, The Wicker Man and Rosemary's Baby. The video work was shown for two weeks as the last programme of the evening.

=== Ihme Contemporary Art Festival 2008 ===
The first Ihme Edition was a full-page newspaper announcement devised by Antony Gormley. The Edition appeared in the newspapers Helsingin Sanomat and Metro on Friday 28 March 2008 and in Hufvudstadsbladet on 29 March 2008. The idea of the announcement was to tell people about the existence of the Pro Arte Foundation Finland and its work, and also to invite readers to take part in Gormley's project in Helsinki in 2009.

=== Ihme 0 ===
The first Ihme production was Ihme 0; films and videos by international contemporary artists. The film programme was screened in Bio Rex cinema in Helsinki on 29 March 2008.
