= Aleksis Kiven katu (Tampere) =

Street in Tampere, Finland

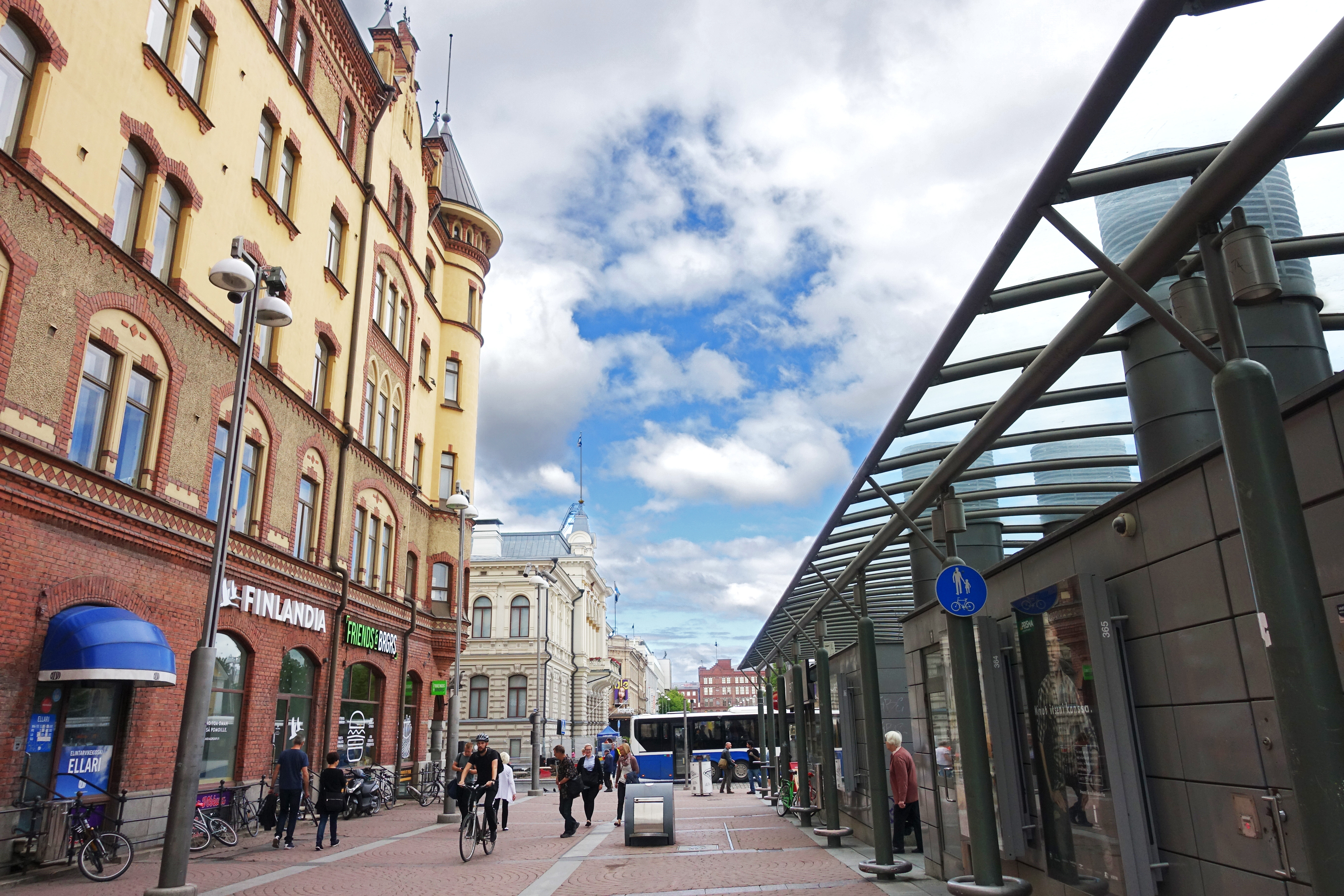
Aleksis Kiven katu

Aleksis Kiven katu is a north–south street in the center of Tampere, Finland, in the districts of Tammerkoski and Nalkala. The street runs along the western edge of Tampere Central Square, and its southern end extends to Laukontori. At the north end of the street is Satakunnankatu. Other cross streets are Puutarhakatu, Kauppakatu, Hämeenkatu and Hallituskatu.

Aleksis Kiven katu, which is named after Aleksis Kivi, the Finnish national author, is one of the most important streets in Tampere, both in terms of location and status. Along it are, among other things, the city's most important administrative buildings, the Tampere City Central Office and the Tampere City Hall.

On the pedestrian section of Aleksis Kiven katu is Radoslaw Gryta's 19-piece work of art Kivikirjasto (2002), which consists mainly of poetic and prose texts carved into granite tiles. They are quotes from works by writers who have lived and worked in Tampere, of which Yrjö Jylhä, Viljo Kajava, Väinö Linna, Eeva-Liisa Manner, Erno Paasilinna, Kalle Päätalo, F. E. Sillanpää and Lauri Viita are represented.
