= Central Square =

Central Square may refer to:

== United States ==
- Central Square, Cambridge, Massachusetts, U.S.
  - Central Square Theater
- Central Square, East Boston, Massachusetts, U.S.
- Central Square, New York, U.S.
  - Central Square School District
  - Central Square Airport, now Syracuse Suburban Airport
- Central Square, Waltham, Massachusetts

== Elsewhere ==
- Tampere Central Square, Finland
- Central Square, Chennai, India
- Central Square (Tolyatti), Russia
- Central Square, Cardiff, Wales, UK

== See also ==
- Central Square Historic District (disambiguation)
