= Kalervo Kummola =

Finnish ice hockey executive, businessman, and politician (born 1945)

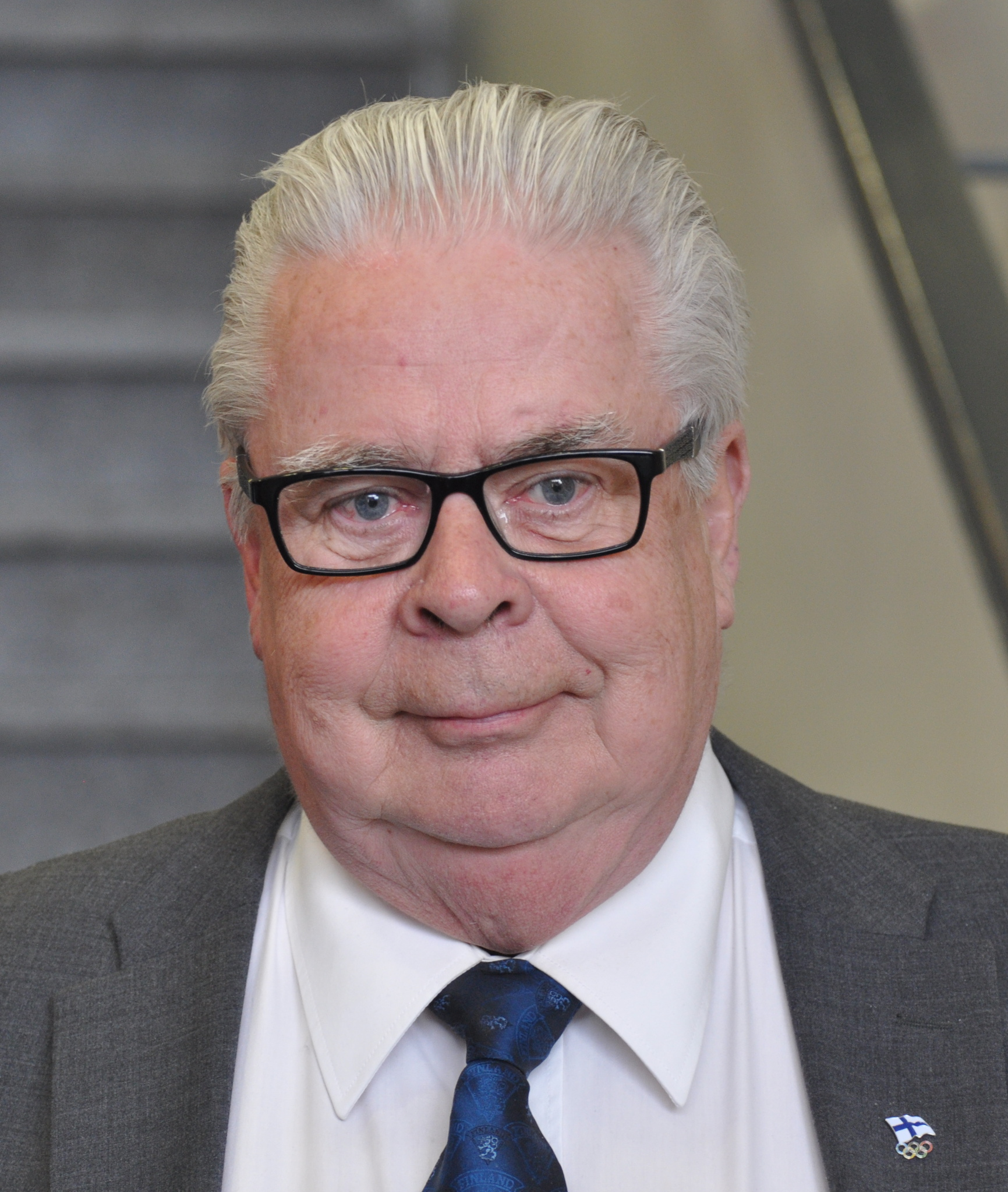
- Kummola in 2015

Member of the Parliament of Finland
- In office 24 March 1999 – 18 March 2003
- Constituency: Pirkanmaa

Member of the City Council of Tampere
- In office 1989–2004

Mayor of Tampere
- In office 15 May 2023 – 2 June 2025

Personal details
- Born: 21 November 1945 (age 80) Raisio, Finland
- Party: National Coalition
- Occupation: Ice hockey executive; businessman
- Known for: International Ice Hockey Federation vice-president; Finnish Ice Hockey Association president; Finnish Olympic Committee chairman; SM-liiga chief executive officer
- Awards: IIHF Hall of Fame; Finnish Hockey Hall of Fame; Order of the White Rose of Finland

Kalervo Juhani Kummola (born 21 November 1945) is a Finnish ice hockey executive, businessman, and politician. He co-founded the hockey club Kiekko-67 at age 21, was later marketing director for HC Turun Palloseura, and chief executive officer of the SM-liiga. Becoming a board member of the Finnish Ice Hockey Association in 1975, he was elected vice-president in 1990, and served as president from 1997 to 2016. He helped organize multiple World Championships hosted in Finland, was an International Ice Hockey Federation (IIHF) vice-president from 2003 to 2021, and chairman of the Finnish Olympic Committee from 2005 to 2016.

In business, Kummola co-founded the television production company VipVision, and was its chief executive officer from 1987 to 1999. He also served as chairman of the Tampere chamber of commerce, was the chief executive officer of the Tampere Hall entertainment and convention facility. In politics, he is a member of the National Coalition Party, was the member of the Parliament of Finland for Pirkanmaa from 1999 to 2003, served on the City Council of Tampere for 15 years, and was a member of the Pirkanmaa regional council, and served on the Finnish delegation to Nordic Council. He served as mayor of Tampere from May 2023 until June 2025.

Kummola was inducted into the builder categories of the Finnish Hockey Hall of Fame in 1996, and the IIHF Hall of Fame in 2023. He was the first hockey person awarded the Grand Cross of Merit for Finnish Sports Culture and Sport, and was given the honorary title of Consul General by the president of Finland. Other honors given to Kummola include the Knight of the Order of the White Rose of Finland, the Medal of the President of the Slovak Republic, and the Golden Cross of the Finnish Olympic Committee.

== Early life ==
Kalervo Juhani Kummola was born on 21 November 1945, in Raisio, Finland, to parents Eino Viljam Kummola and Aili Johanna Lehto. He grew up in a Pentecostal family, and had one brother and two sisters. He played ice hockey as a youth, and described himself as a troublemaker in elementary school. From age 10 onward, he went to a Christian summer camp, and accompanied his father building houses.

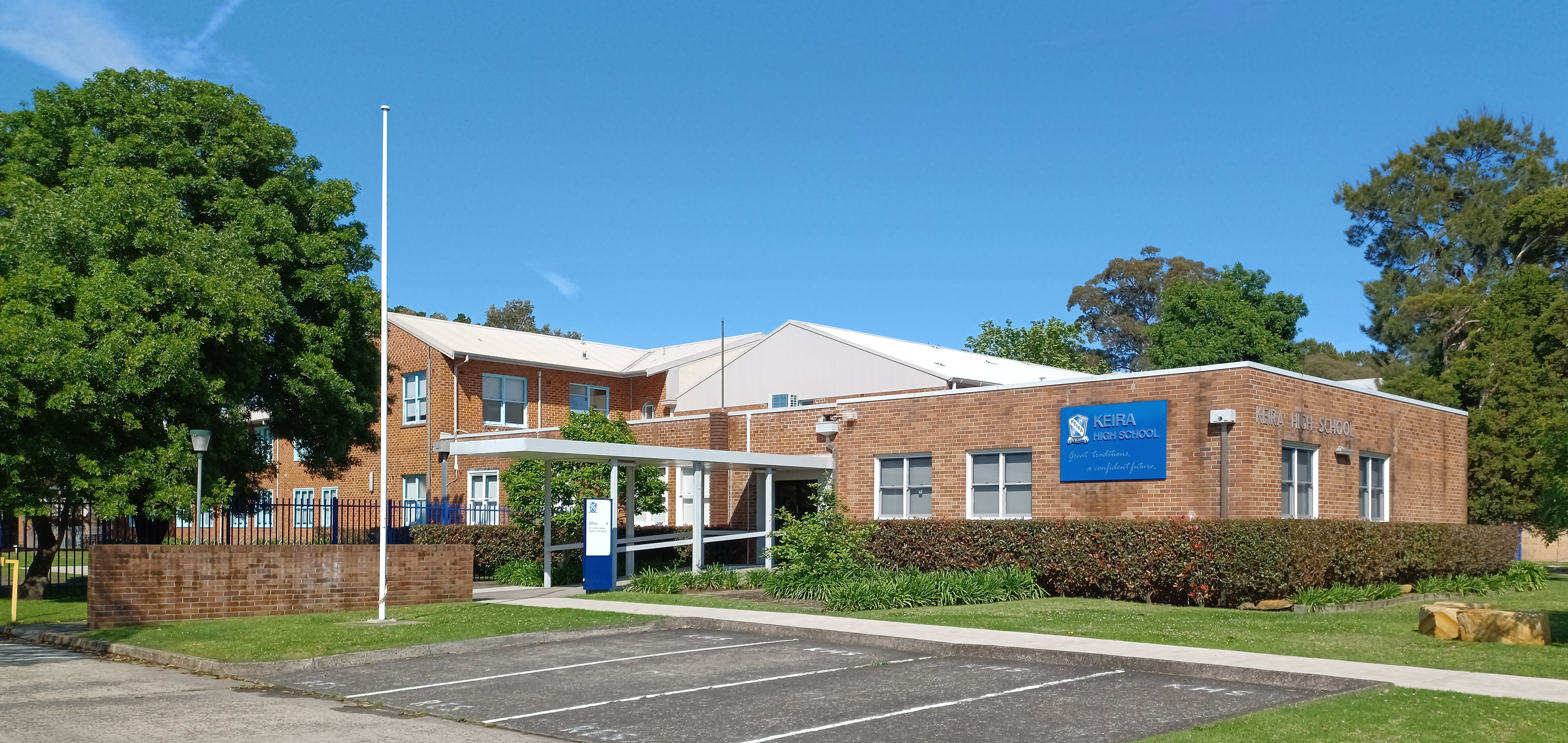
Keira Boys' High School

At age 13, Kummola moved with his family to Australia, where he lived for three years and learned to speak English. He played football and baseball at school, and graduated from Keira Boys' High School in North Wollongong, New South Wales, in 1962.

Kummola returned to Finland with his family at age 16, and attended the Reserve Officer School to become a second lieutenant in the Finnish Defence Forces. When his family moved to Australia again, he remained in Finland since he could have been drafted into service for Australia during the Vietnam War. He later reached the rank of major in the reserves of the Finnish Defence Forces.

== Ice hockey career ==
Kummola played hockey as goaltender in for several lower-division teams in Turku, and established a team for the Pentecostal church. After retiring from playing, he co-founded the Kiekko-67 ice hockey and roller in-line hockey club. He was elected president of Kiekko-67 at age 22, becoming the youngest ice hockey club president in Finland. The election came on his 22nd birthday. He later joked that, "My teammates said I would be better as a club manager than as a goalkeeper". He later worked as the marketing director for HC Turun Palloseura from 1971 to 1975, then relocated to Tampere when he became chief executive officer of the newly-established professional SM-liiga in 1975. He served in the position for 12 years until 1987.

=== Finnish Ice Hockey Association ===
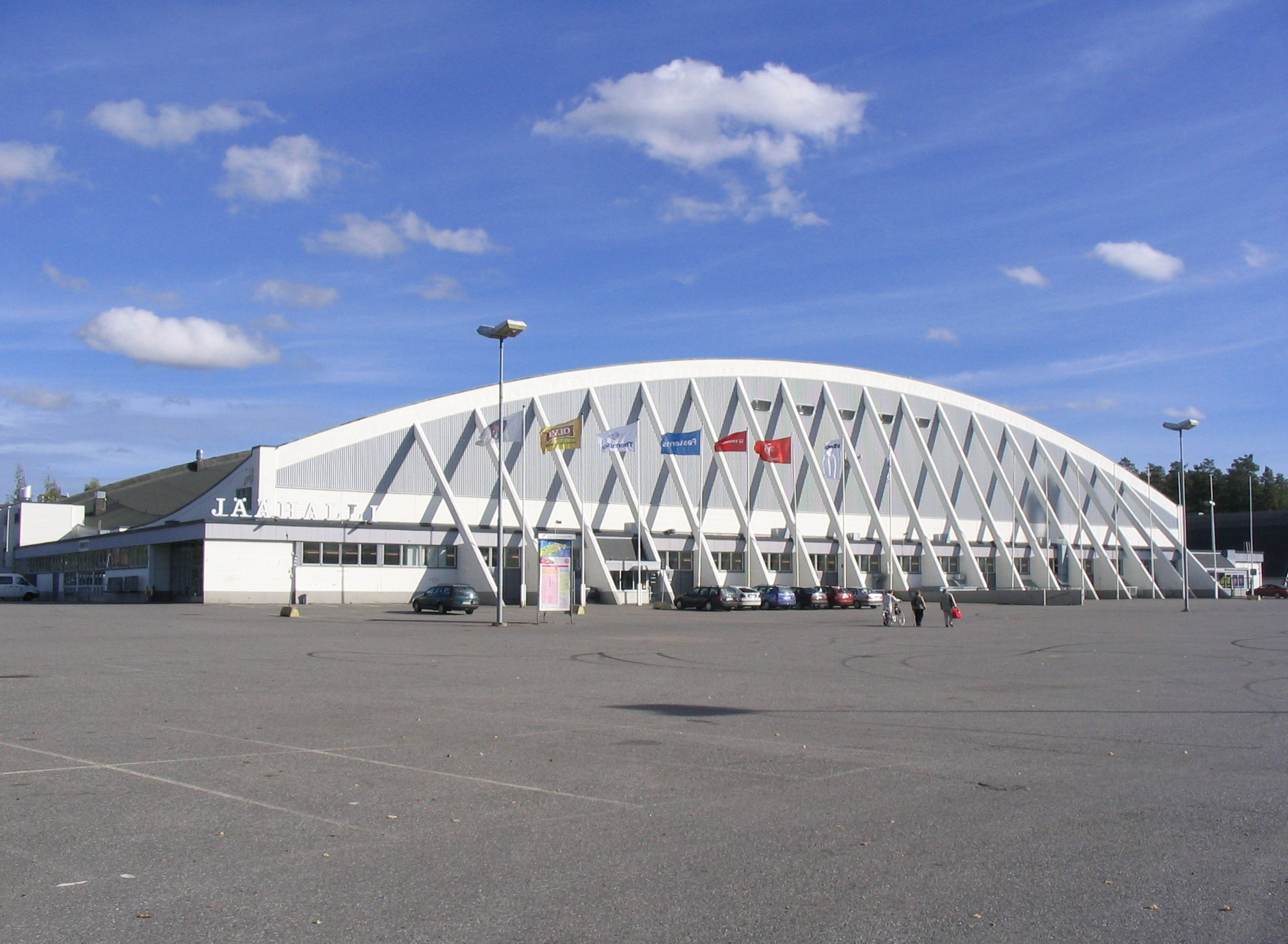
Tampere Ice Stadium was the original home of the Finnish Hockey Hall of Fame.

Kummola became a board member of the Finnish Ice Hockey Association in 1975, was elected its vice-president in 1990, and served as its president from 1997 to 2016, serving under president Kai Hietarinta. Kummola was one of the founding members of the Finnish Hockey Hall of Fame in 1979, sat on its board of directors for 33 years, and has been chairman of the inductee selection committee since 1986.

During his tenure with the association, he served as secretary general of the 1982 Ice Hockey World Championships held in Helsinki and Tampere; and was on the organizing committees of multiple Ice Hockey World Championships and IIHF World Junior Championship hosted in Finland. When the Finland national men's team won its first World Championships gold medal at the 1995 championships hosted in Sweden, Kummola called it his "great moment"; and recalled that "We had a Swedish coach, Curt Lindström, who I found in a nightclub in Munich in 1993".

One of Kummola's concerns as president was reducing the number of players leaving the country for Sweden, and felt it more of a priority than winning a World Championship. In the latter part of his presidency, he worked on preparations for the 2022 IIHF World Championship hosted in Tampere, which had last hosted the World Championships in 1965. Kummola was a driving force behind construction of the Nokia Arena in Tampere, which took 15 years of planning to build the venue. He also enacted a ban on tobacco and alcohol for players and officials shall be prohibited, with the reasoning that it upheld ethics in sport in addition to avoiding health hazards.

=== International Ice Hockey Federation ===
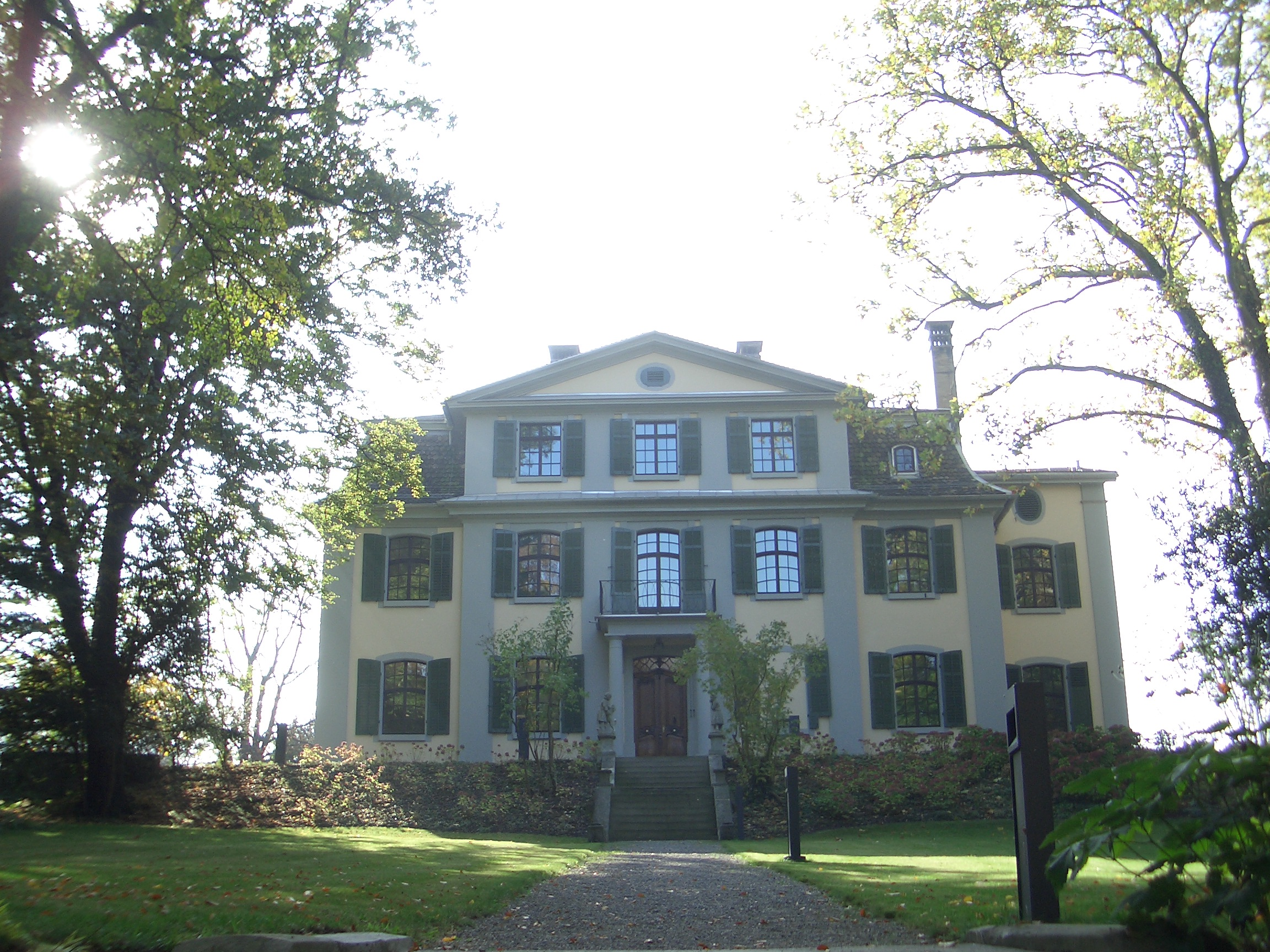
IIHF headquarters in Zürich

Kummola was named the Finnish delegate to the International Ice Hockey Federation (IIHF) in 1976, and the IIHF council beginning in 1998. From 1998 to 2003, he was chairman of the IIHF committees for championship host bids, championship structure, and discipline.

The IIHF elected Kummola a vice-president in 2003. In 2005, he helped the IIHF reach an agreement with the National Hockey League to govern the movement of professional players from Europe to North America. He was chairman of the IIHF committees for coaching and sport from 2003 to 2008, and was president of the international Champions Hockey League for the 2008–09 season. Other work included chairman of the facilities and environment committee from 2008 to 2012, chairman of the co-ordination committee from 2013 to 2016, and chairman of the event and evaluation committee from 2016 to 2020.

Kummola retired as vice-president in 2021, serving his whole tenure under president René Fasel, who also retired in 2021. Kummola remained involved with the IIHF, named to the hall of fame and historical working group from 2021 to 2026.

== Finnish national sports ==
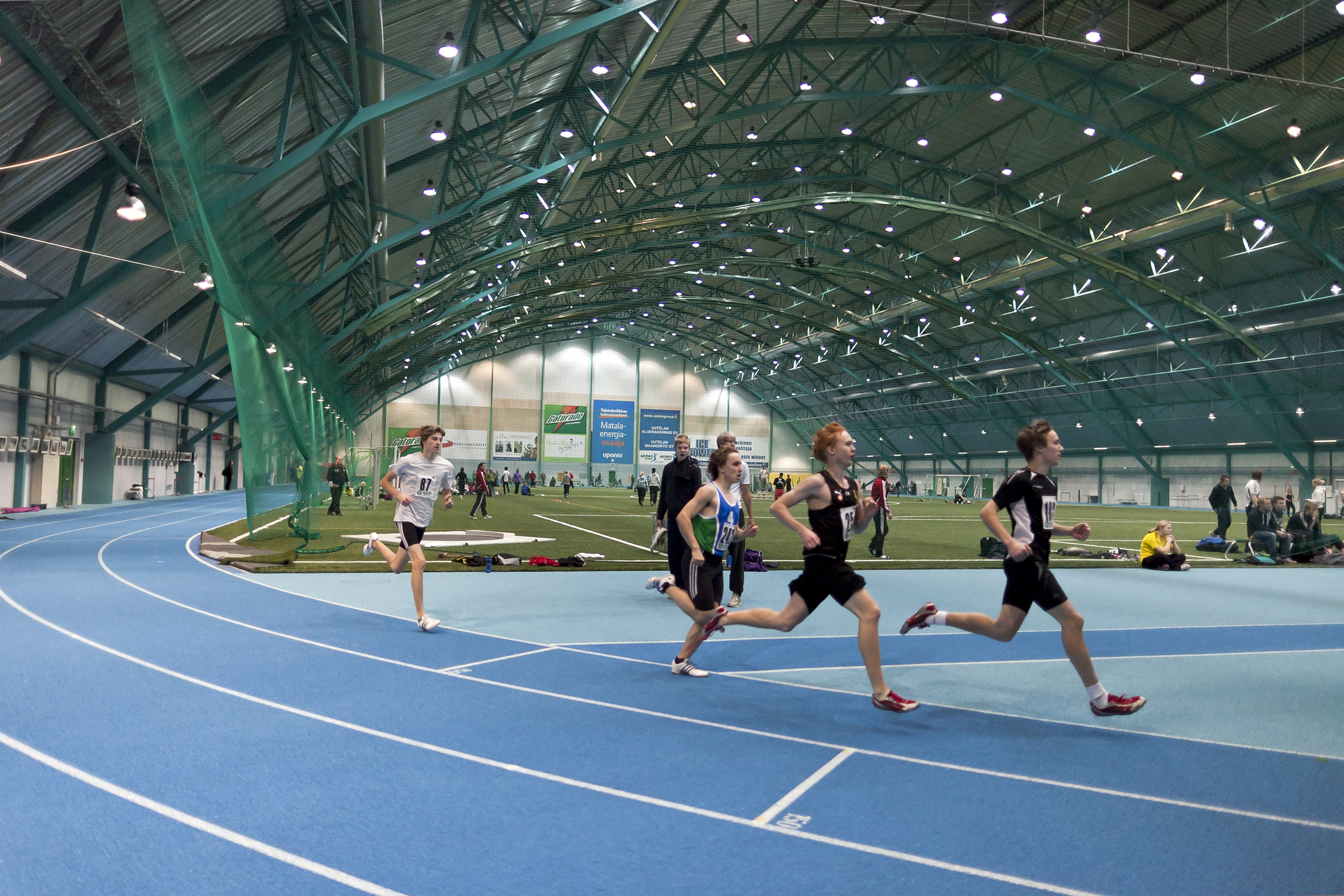
Pajulahti Sports Institute

Kummola was a member of the board of directors for the Finnish Olympic Committee from 1993 to 2005, then served as its chairman from 2005 to 2016. He was a member of the board of directors for the Pajulahti Sports Institute from 1994 to 2006, then served as its chairman from 2006 to 2014. He also served as chairman of the organizing committee for the Finnish Athletics Championships in 1996.

== Business career ==
Kummola worked in administration for Unilever Finland from 1966 to 1973, then was the marketing manager for FC Inter Turku from 1973 to 1975. He co-founded the television production company VipVision in 1987, and served as its chief executive officer from 1987 to 1999.

VipVision produced entertainment shows for MTV3, and Kummola was in involved with making the Finnish version of Wheel of Fortune, Hyvät herrat (Gentlemen), and Hockey Night in Finland. During his tenure at VipVision, he was inspired to introduce karaoke to Finland after visiting his brother. Kummola thought it would be a craze for a few years, but it remained popular to his surprise.

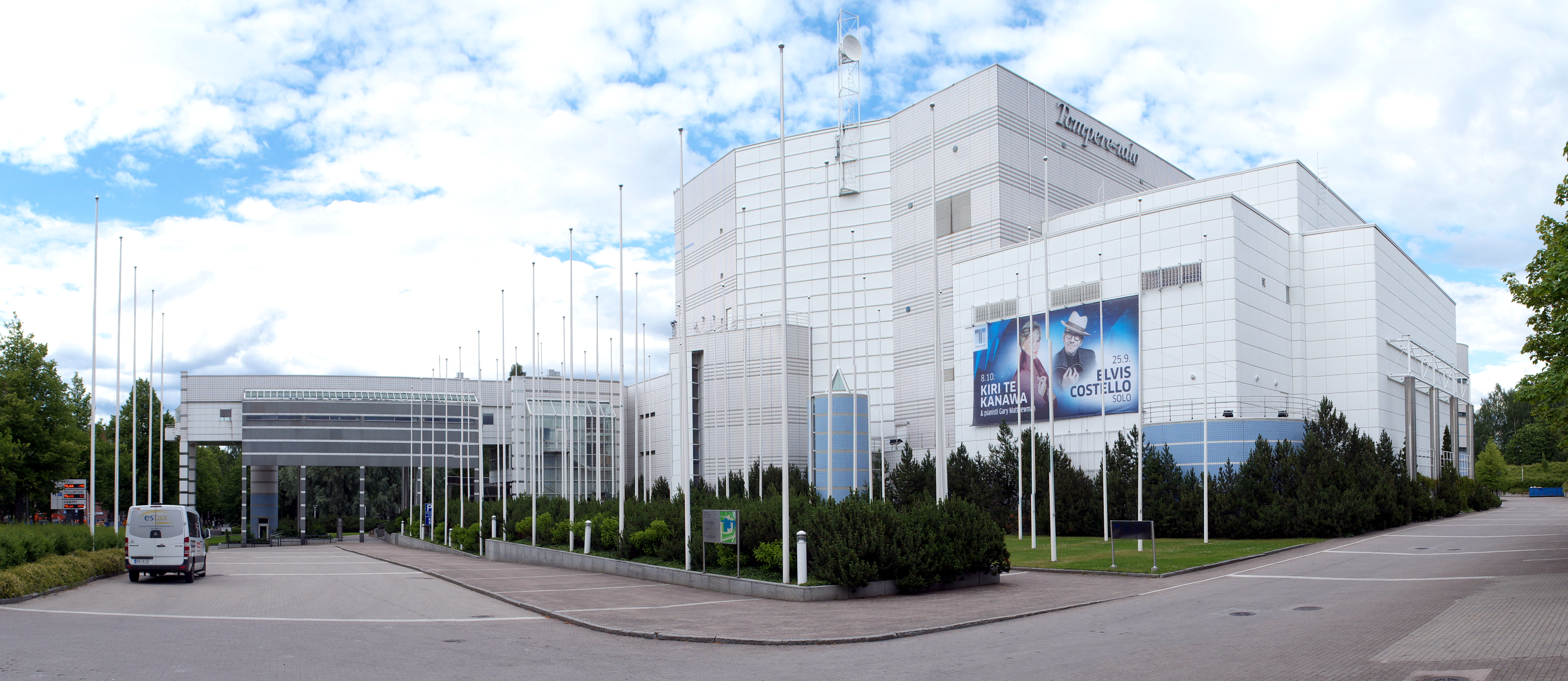
Tampere Hall

Kummola served as chairman of the Tampere chamber of commerce from 1993 to 2017, was chairman of the Vierumäki Country Club from 2006 to 2017, and served as vice-chairman of the School of Art and Communication at the Tampere University of Applied Sciences. From 2004 to 2011, he was the chief executive officer of the entertainment and convention facility, Tampere Hall. He helped organize European Union meetings at the hall, and envisioned a multi-purpose centre expansion next to the Sorsapuisto for major events including World Championships.

Kummola later served as chairman of the Tampere Group, which oversees 40 local companies. In a 2020 magazine interview, Kummola stated his desire to be involved in "projects that leave something visible to the next generations".

== Political career ==
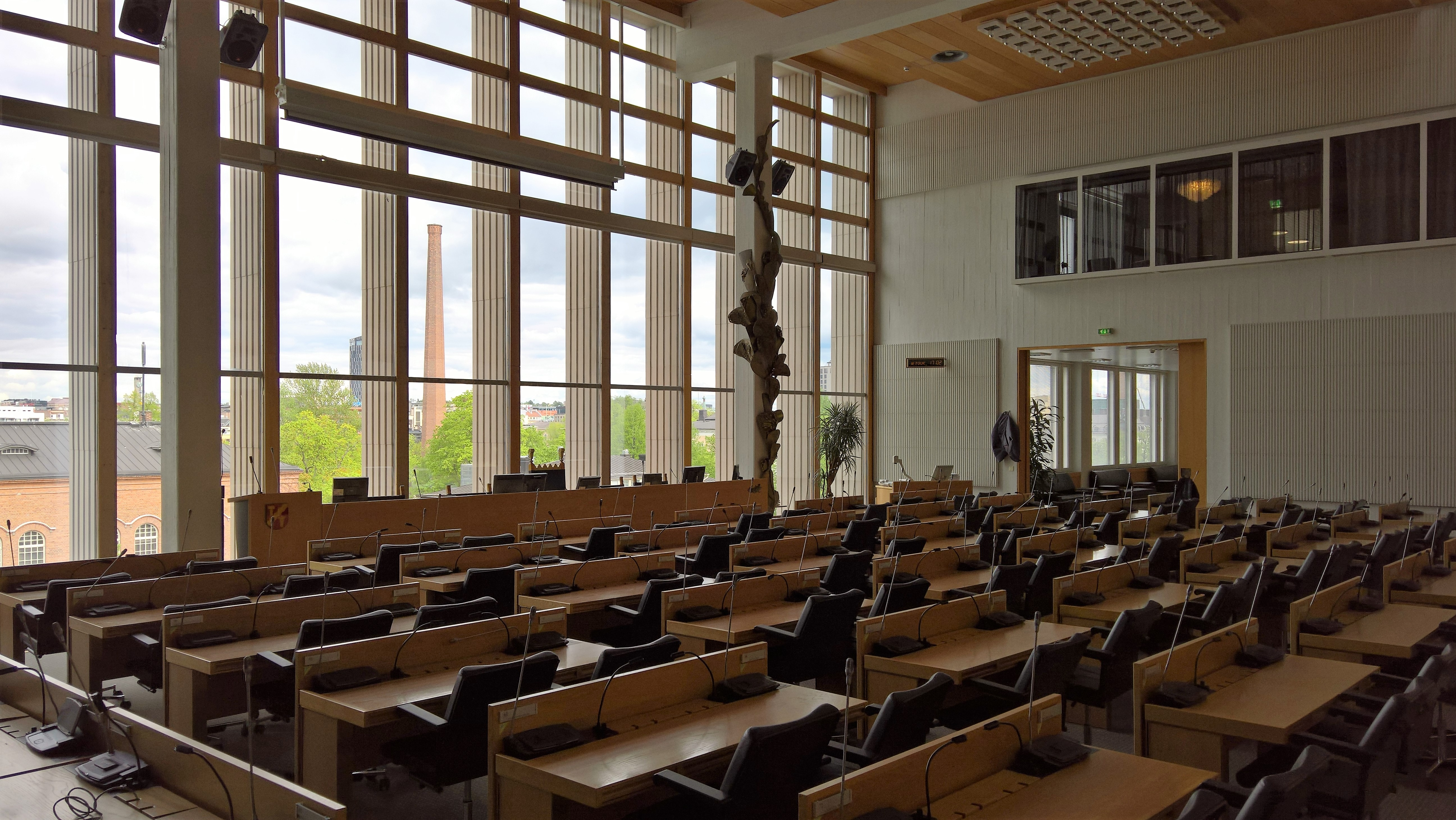
Meeting hall of the City Council of Tampere

Kummola served as chairman of the Pirkanmaa electoral district of the National Coalition Party, and was elected the district's deputy commissioner in advance of the 1980 Finnish municipal elections. He served on the City Council of Tampere from 1989 until 2004, and was its vice-chairman from 1997 to 1999. He also served on the Tampere City Board from 1989 to 1997; was a member of the Pirkanmaa Council from 1997 to 2001, and its chairman from 2001 to 2005.

In the 1999 Finnish parliamentary election, Kummola was elected to the Parliament of Finland as the National Coalition Party candidate for Pirkanmaa, serving from 24 March 1999, until 18 March 2003. In parliament, he served on committees for national defense, economics, and environmental audits. He also served on the Finnish delegation to Nordic Council in 1999, and was an auditor of the Bank of Finland from 2000 to 2002. He declined candidacy in the 2003 election, as he was not interested in serving as opposition to the government.

Contesting the National Coalition Party nomination for mayor of Tampere in the 2021 Finnish municipal elections, Kummola sought to improve elderly care, medical treatments, and the situation for marginalized youth. Anna-Kaisa Ikonen won the party's nomination and was later elected mayor.

Kummola was appointed mayor of Tampere on 15 May 2023, to complete the mayoral term vacated by Anna-Kaisa Ikonen who was elected to the Parliament of Finland. Serving until 31 May 2025, Kummola was also chairman of the city board. In his first speech as mayor, he sought a balanced budget to continue urban development, and stressed the need to take care of children, youth and the elderly, and have a comprehensive school network. Two new city council committees were established in 2023, for education, and culture and recreation. He felt that the Tampere light rail project and arena project were priorities, and the need to keep highly educated people in Tampere.

Running for a second term in the 2025 Finnish municipal elections, Kummola lost to Ilmari Nurminen. Kummola remained chairman of the city council when his term as mayor expired on 2 June 2025.

== Personal life ==
Kummola married Tuula Annikki Kuusela in 1969, and has two daughters. The couple met on a blind date in 1966, and reside in Tampere as of 2015. He became independently wealthy due to his success in television.

In recreational time, Kummola partakes in birdwatching and fishing, and listens to the Christian Radio Dei. He owns an island in the Kustavi-Uusikaupunki area, and claims to have spotted more than 50 bird species locally. He is interested in environmental issues, nature conservation, and preserving the Baltic Sea.

In 1999, Kummola was a rallying participant involved in a crash with a car driven by Teemu Selänne, which put Kummola into a wheelchair for four months.

== Honors and legacy ==
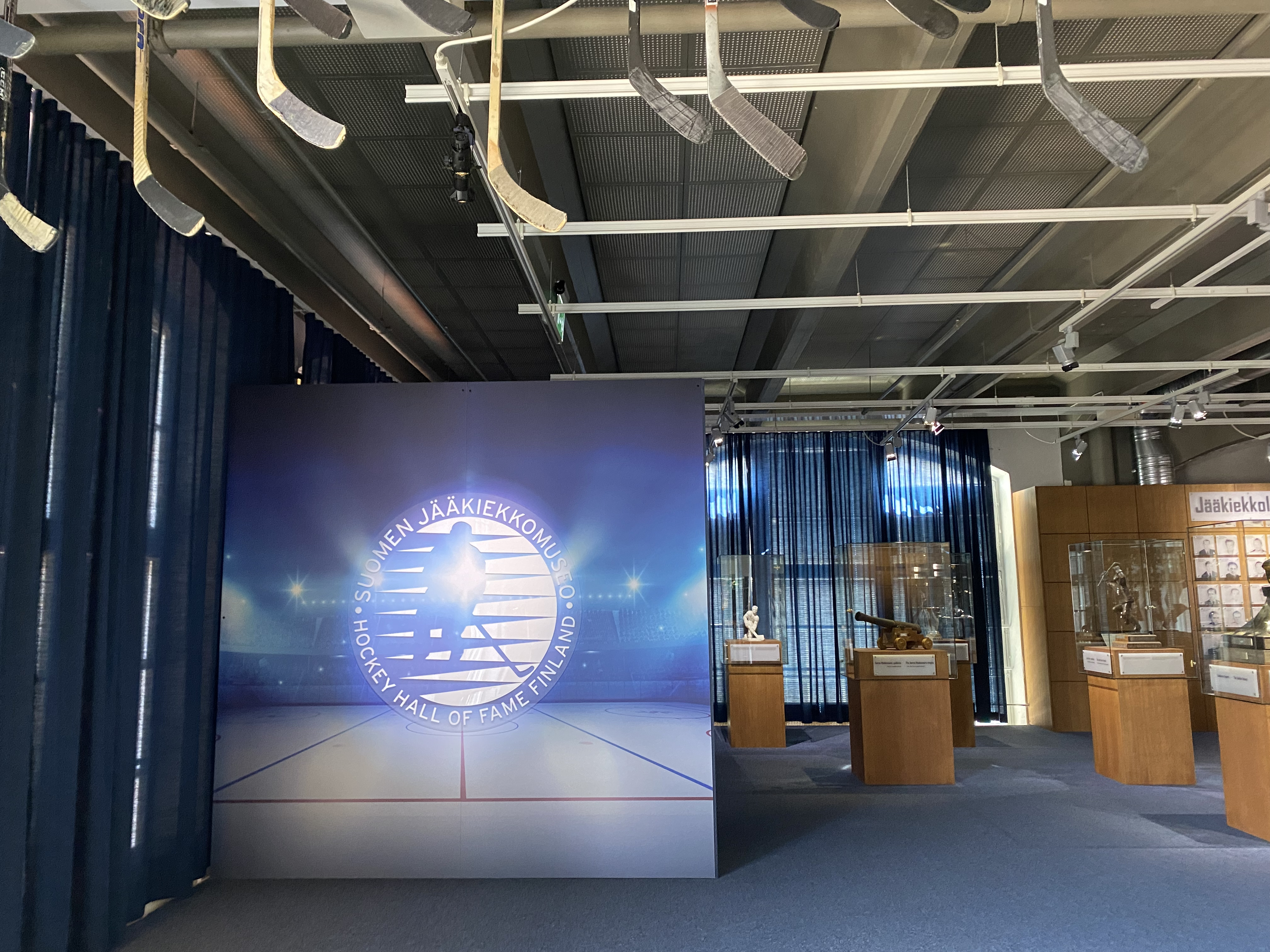
Finnish Hockey Hall of Fame entrance

Kummola has received multiple honors for his work in hockey. He was inducted into the builder category of the Finnish Hockey Hall of Fame in 1996, and inducted into the Hall of Fame for HC Turun Palloseura in 2015. He was honored for his lifetime contributions to Finnish ice hockey, at the Finnish Sports Gala in January 2019. He was also named an honorary chairman of the Finnish Ice Hockey Association. He was inducted into the builder category of the IIHF Hall of Fame in 2023, during a ceremony held prior to the medal games of the 2023 IIHF World Championship in Tampere.

In April 2016, Kummola was the first ice hockey person to be awarded the Grand Cross of Merit for Finnish Sports Culture and Sport. In June 2016, the president of Finland awarded Kummola the honorary title of Consul General to Kummola. The Tampere Chamber of Commerce named Kummola the economic influencer of the year for 2017.

On 22 October 2015, Kummola received the Medal of the President of the Slovak Republic for his work in international ice hockey. Other honors given to Kummola include the Knight of the Order of the White Rose of Finland, the Golden Cross of the Finnish Olympic Committee, the Grand Cross of Merit, the Golden Medal of Merit of the City of Tampere, and the Golden Order of Merit of the National Coalition Party.

Kummola is known by the nickname "Rautakansleri" ("Iron Chancellor"), which was also the title of his biography co-authored with Jari Korkki in 2020. Kummola established the Kalervo Kummola Fund, to benefit low-income youth playing hockey in Finland. When his tenure ended as vice-president of the IIHF, the Finnish Broadcasting Company felt that Finland would lose influence in international hockey without his presence.
