= Charles Street Workers' Housing Historic District =

Historic district in Massachusetts, United States

- U.S. National Register of Historic Places
- U.S. Historic district
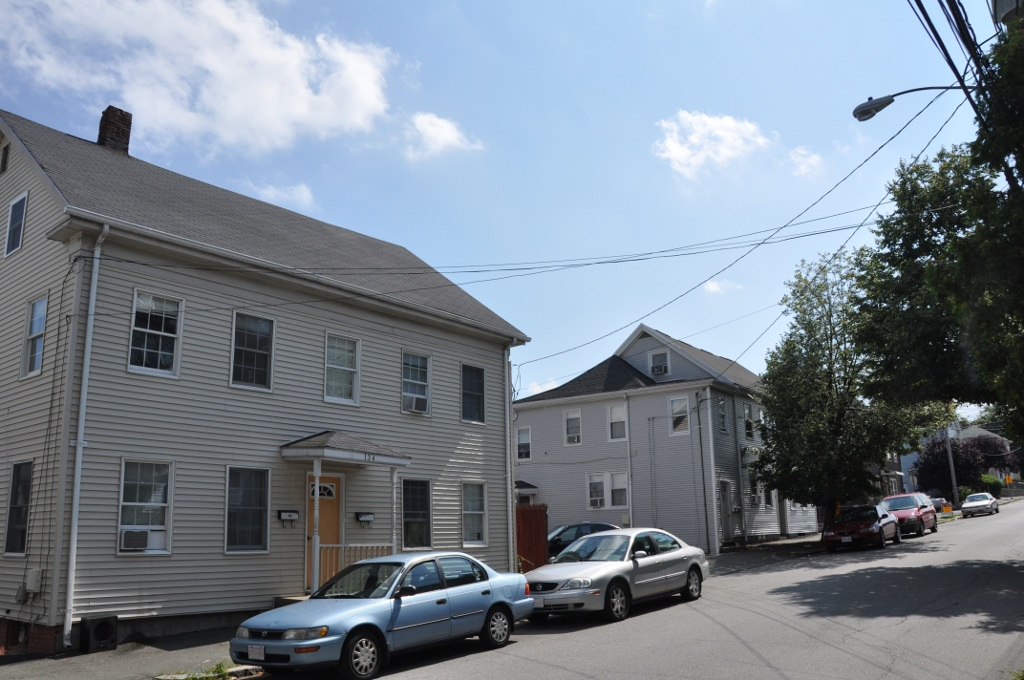

- Location within Massachusetts Location within the United States
- Location: 128–144 Charles St., Waltham, Massachusetts
- Coordinates: 42°22′25″N 71°14′37″W
- Area: less than one acre
- Built: 1865
- MPS: Waltham MRA
- NRHP reference No.: 89001503
- Added to NRHP: September 28, 1989

The Charles Street Workers' Housing Historic District is a residential historic district at 128–144 Charles Street in Waltham, Massachusetts. It consists of four houses on a single city block, all of which are well-preserved vernacular worker houses built in 1865. They are representative of the city's growth of the period, and typify housing built for the city's laborers. The district was listed on the National Register of Historic Places in 1989.

== Description and history ==
The district is located on the south side of Charles Street, a predominantly densely-built residential street extending west from the city's Central Square. It consists of a single block of Charles Street, between Williams and Harvard Street, with four uniform houses on it. All are unpretentious vernacular 2-1/2 story wood frame buildings, with simple decorations, and only modest modern alterations. One of the buildings, that at 128-132 Charles, is a duplex; the others are single family houses. The styling of the houses is reminiscent of the Greek Revival, with only one of the three houses sporting a 20th-century porch.

The houses were constructed in 1865 by Edward Campbell, as part of a westward expansion of worker house along the street. The area in which they were built was populated mainly by Irish laborers, as evidenced by what is known of the owners and residents of these houses at the time, and by the use of Irish names for some of the area streets. Early occupants were described in city directories as laborers.

== See also ==
- Building at 202-204 Charles Street
- National Register of Historic Places listings in Waltham, Massachusetts
