= City Council of Tampere =

Highest decision-making organ in the Finnish city of Tampere

City Council of Tampere Tampereen kaupunginvaltuusto

Leadership
- Chairperson: Kalervo Kummola, SDP

Structure
- Seats: 67
- Political groups: Social Democrats (20); National Coalition (17); Green League (12); Left Alliance (8); Finns Party (4); Centre Party (3); Christian Democrats (2); SFP (1)
- Length of term: 4 years

Elections
- Last election: 2025
- Next election: 2029

City Council of Tampere (Finnish: Tampereen kaupunginvaltuusto) is the highest decision-making organ of Tampere. It consists of 67 members who are elected every four years in the municipal election.

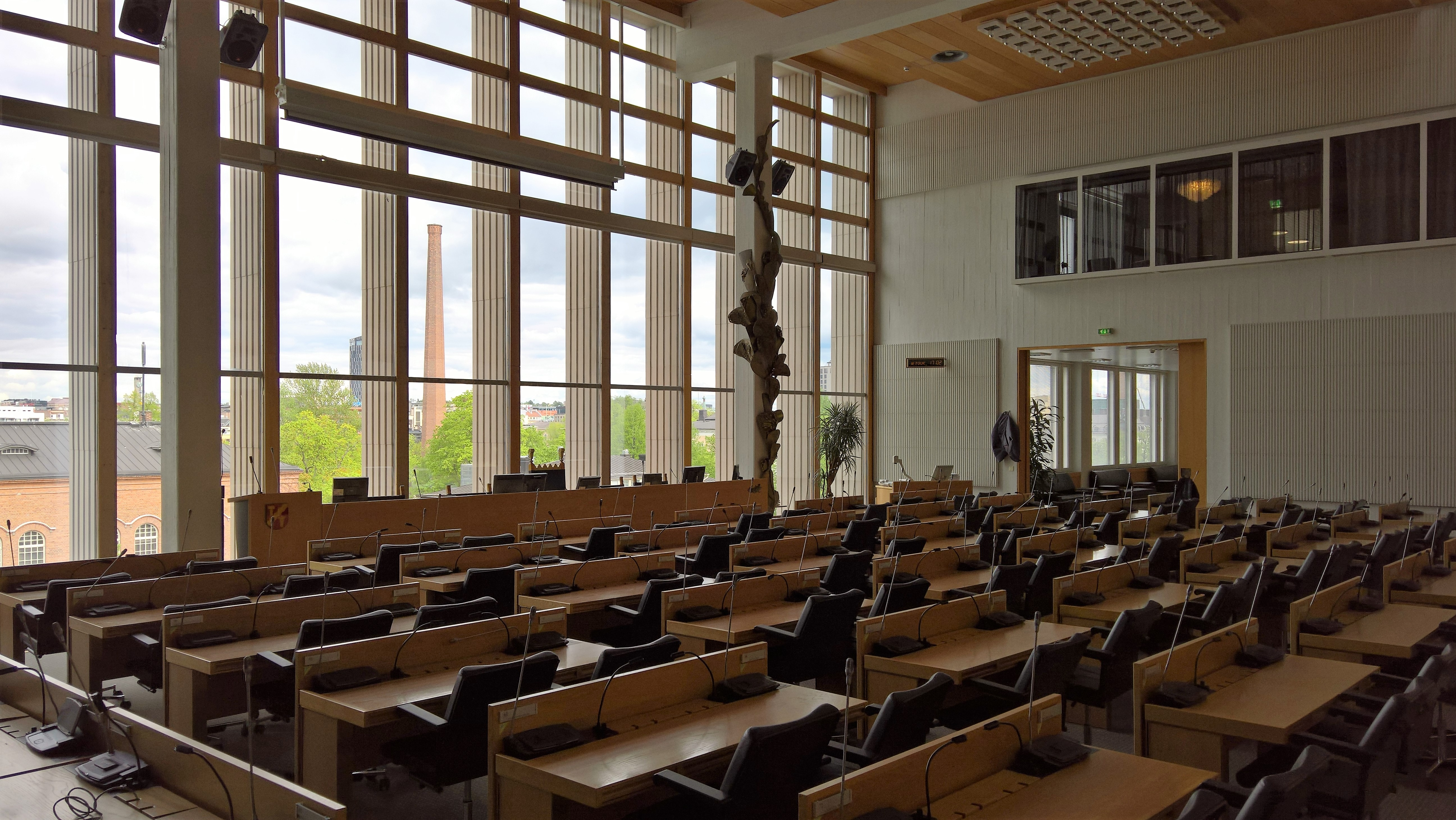
The sitting hall of the city council.

The council meets at the Tampere City Central Office Building (sometimes called "The White House") in the city centre. The meetings take place almost always on Mondays. The meetings are sent on radio by Radio Moreeni.

The National Coalition Party and the Swedish People's Party have been in a local alliance since the municipal election of 2008, which means they form one unified council group.

== Latest election ==
Following the 2025 Finnish municipal elections the SDP won a plurality of 27 seats with the runner up NCP placing three seats behind. As a result of the election Ilmari Nurminen became the mayor of Tampere. He leads a political coalition consisting of the SDP, NCP, Greens, Left Alliance, Centre Party and SFP.
