= Moody Street Fire Station =

- U.S. National Register of Historic Places
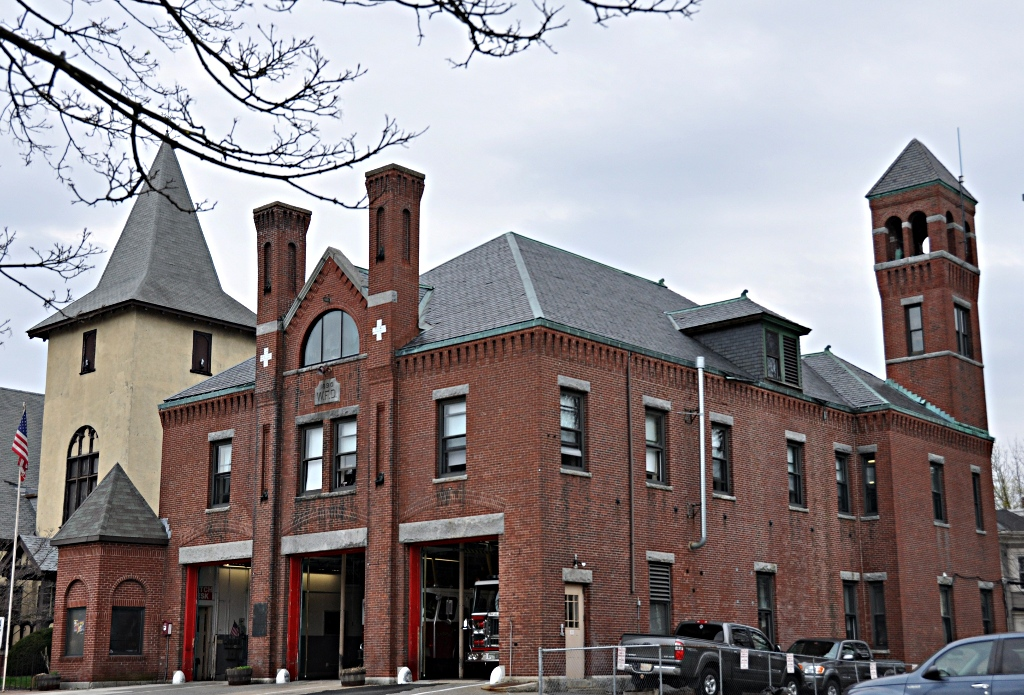

- Location within Massachusetts Location within the United States
- Location: 533 Moody St., Waltham, Massachusetts
- Coordinates: 42°22′1.9″N 71°14′16.8″W
- Built: 1890
- Architect: Patch, Samuel
- Architectural style: Queen Anne, Romanesque
- MPS: Waltham MRA
- NRHP reference No.: 89001541
- Added to NRHP: September 28, 1989

The Moody Street Fire Station is a historic fire station at 533 Moody Street in Waltham, Massachusetts. Built in 1890, it is one of two nearly identical fire stations designed by local architect Captain Samuel Patch. (The other is the central fire station on Lexington Street, listed in the Central Square Historic District.) It was built during the South Side's rapid development due to the growth of the Waltham Watch Company, and is an excellent example of Queen Anne/Romanesque Revival styling. It was gutted by fire in 1900, and reopened in 1901. The station underwent a full renovation with a new station built next door and connected to the existing station in 2019. On June 21, 2021, the fire station reopened after a nearly $10 million renovation.

The building was listed on the National Register of Historic Places in 1989.

== See also ==
- National Register of Historic Places listings in Waltham, Massachusetts
