= Daniel French School =

Historic school building in Massachusetts, United States

- U.S. National Register of Historic Places
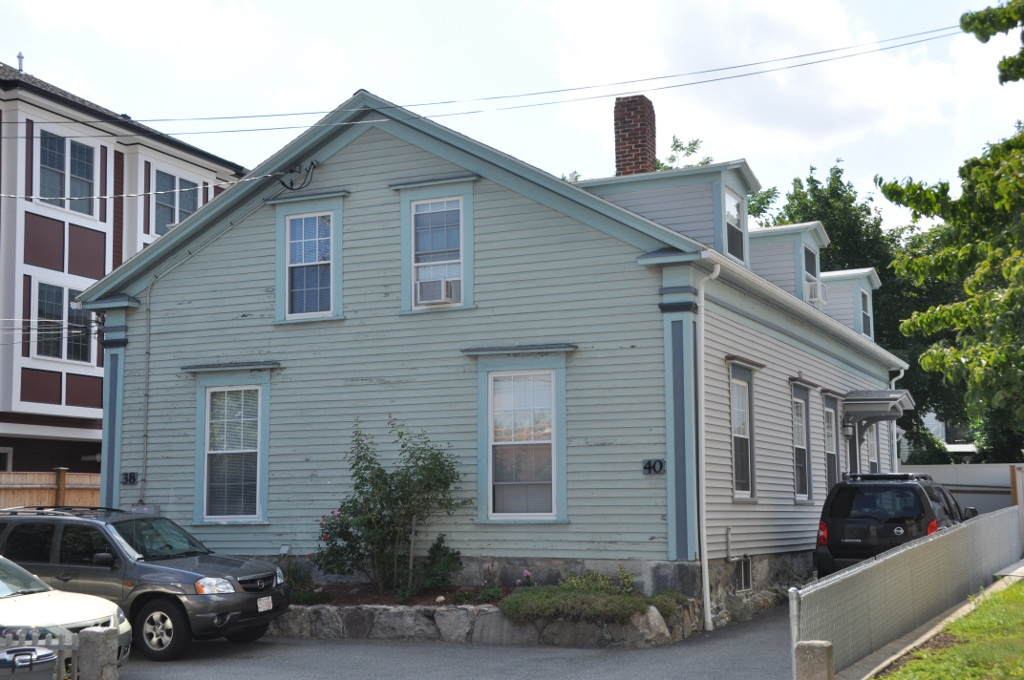

- Location within Massachusetts Location within the United States
- Location: 38–40 Common St., Waltham, Massachusetts
- Coordinates: 42°22′39″N 71°14′15″W
- Built: 1847
- Architectural style: Greek Revival
- MPS: Waltham MRA
- NRHP reference No.: 89001581
- Added to NRHP: September 28, 1989

The Daniel French School is a historic school building at 38–40 Common Street in Waltham, Massachusetts. Built in 1847 by a prominent local educator, it is a well-preserved example of vernacular Greek Revival architecture, and is important for the role it played in Waltham's 19th century educational environment. The building was listed on the National Register of Historic Places in 1989. It is now a residential duplex.

== Description and history ==
The Daniel French School is located on the west side of Common Street, which extends north from Waltham's Central Square. It is a 1 1/2-story wood-frame structure, oriented with its front facing north and presenting a side gable to the street. The building corners have paneled pilasters, and the roof is pierced on both sides by three gabled dormers. The two first-floor windows on the street-facing facade may be replacements for the original school doors, done c. 1860 when the building became residential.

The building was built by Daniel French, an educator whose students (when he first began teaching in Boston) included Charles Francis Adams, Jr. He moved to Waltham in 1842, where he first served as principal of its high school. He established a private school in 1844, building this structure in 1847 for that endeavour. He stopped teaching in 1858, selling the building the following year to William Clark, a grocer. Clark converted it into its present use as a residential duplex.

== See also ==
- National Register of Historic Places listings in Waltham, Massachusetts
