= Central Square Historic District =

Central Square Historic District may refer to:

- Central Square Historic District (Cambridge, Massachusetts), listed on the NRHP in Massachusetts
- Central Square Historic District (Lynn, Massachusetts), listed on the NRHP in Massachusetts
- Central Square Historic District (Stoneham, Massachusetts), listed on the NRHP in Massachusetts
- Central Square Historic District (Waltham, Massachusetts), listed on the NRHP in Massachusetts
- Central Square Historic District (Weymouth, Massachusetts), listed on the NRHP in Massachusetts
- Central Square Historic District (Bristol, New Hampshire), listed on the NRHP in New Hampshire

== See also ==
- Central Square (disambiguation)
