= Hallituskatu (Tampere) =

Street in Tampere, Finland

Coordinates: 61°29′46″N 23°45′11″E

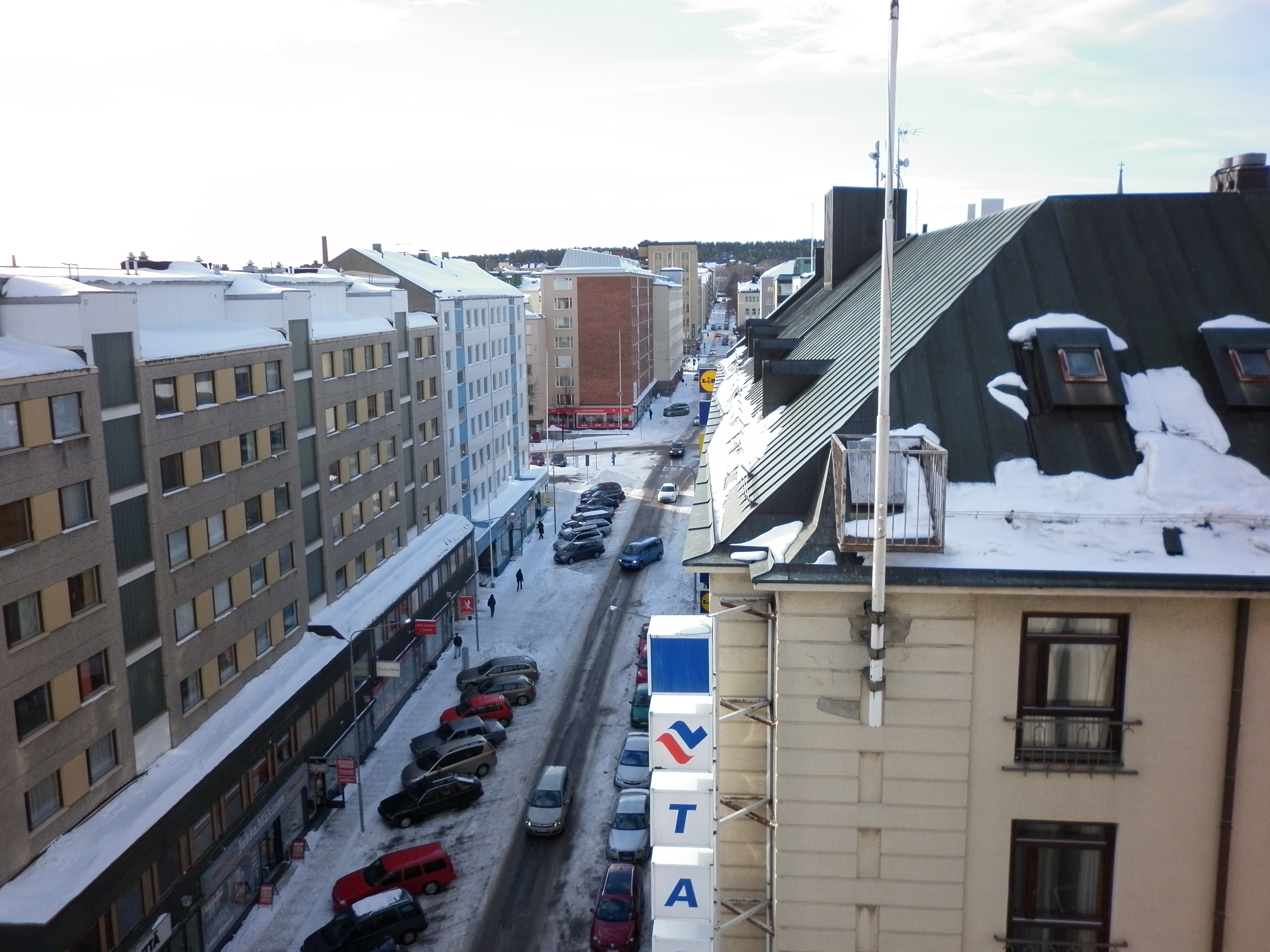
A view of the Hallituskatu in the direction of Pyynikki.

Hallituskatu is an east–west street running through the districts of Nalkala and Kaakinmaa, in the centre of Tampere, Finland. Its end point in the east is the cartboard factory area of Metsä Board Tako.

The street name Hallituskatu (literally translated "government street") dates from 1807, when it was created as a result of committee work. It is one of the oldest street names in Tampere. The name model may have been a Stockholm street name, as it is known that there were no other Hallituskatus in Finland's major cities at that time. There is also no local justification for using the name.

Along Hallituskatu are Tampere Workers' Hall, Tampere Market Hall, The Aamulehti Building and three school buildings.

== See also ==
- Aleksis Kiven katu

== Sources ==
Media related to Hallituskatu (Tampere) at Wikimedia Commons

- Louhivaara, Maija (1999). Tampereen kadunnimet. Tampere: Tampereen museot. ISBN 951-609-105-9. (in Finnish)
