= Viikinsaari =

Island in Finland

Coordinates: 61°29′N 23°41′E

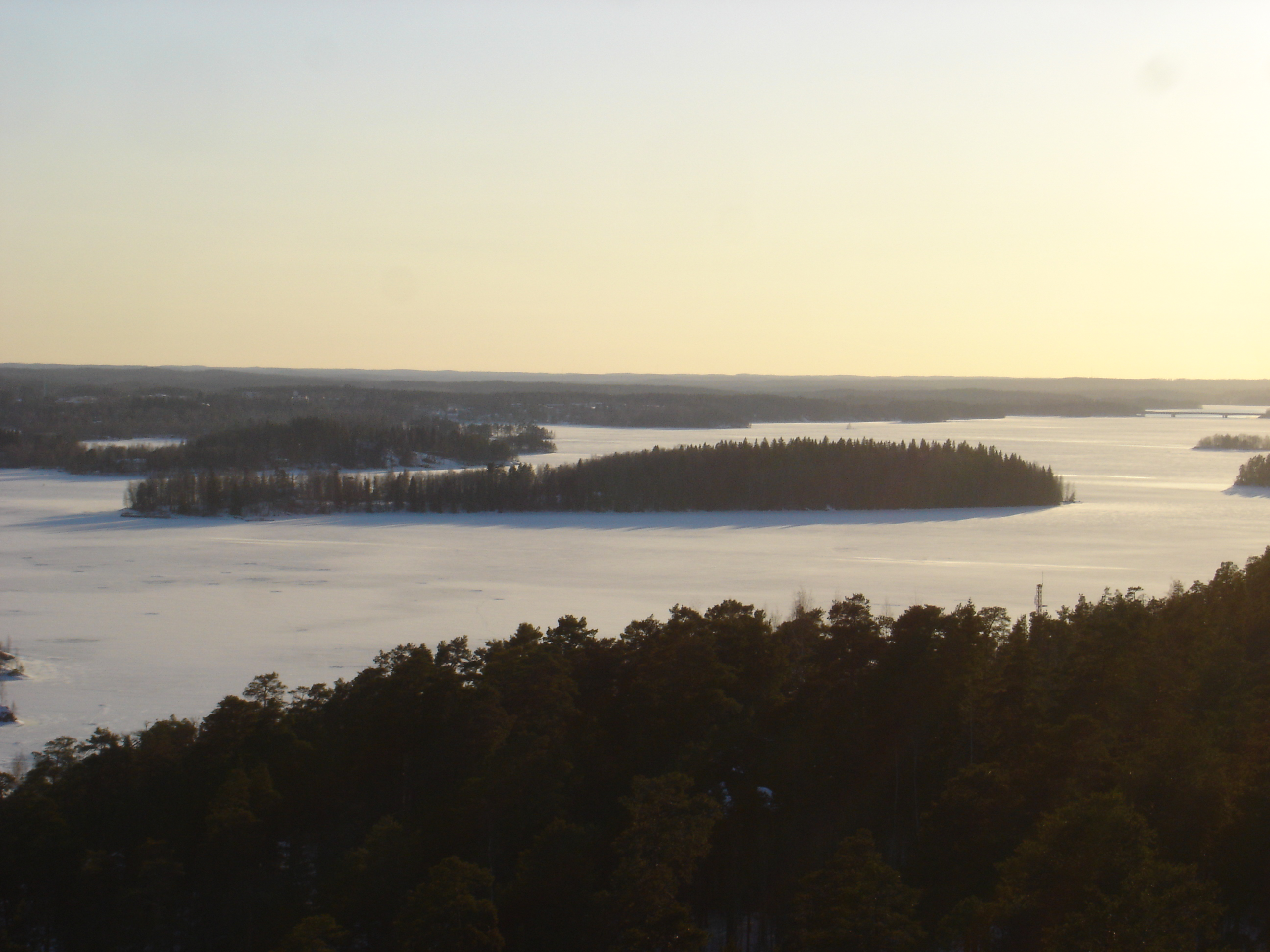
View of Viikinsaari island in Pyhäjärvi near Tampere

Viikinsaari is an island located in the lake Pyhäjärvi belonging to the City of Tampere, Finland. The island is a popular nature resort and an outdoor recreation area, attracting visitors all year round. In the summertime there is a boat connection to the island from the Laukontori harbour. In winter, the island can be reached by walking or skiing.

The western part is a nature reserve, but there are also swimming shores, playgrounds, a small chapel, a fireplace for roasting sausages, a restaurant, a footpath through the nature reserve and a dance pavilion on the island. Viikinsaari is administrated by the Tampere Culture Affairs, which organises happenings and events throughout summer for people in all ages, for example nature tours for children, dance lessons and events and music nights. It is also possible to rent a rowing boat, fishing rods, miniature golf equipment and there's a selection of games that can be borrowed from the Info office, including petanque, croquet, badminton, darts, football, volleyball and board games. Part of the events are organised by the private ferry company Suomen Hopealinja and the restaurant Wanha Kaidesaari.

The first mentions about Viikinsaari date back to 1596. Until the 19th century the island was known as Kaidesaari, but the name was changed when the island became property of the Viikki Manor. The confectioner Carl Gustav Tallqvist opened a restaurant on the island first in 1866 and had a boat built to start a ferry service from the land. He later bought the islands from Viikki mansion, in the year 1881. After Tallqvist's death the island was deserted for some time. It was at the most used for herding until the City of Tampere bought it in 1893. After the restaurant had burnt down twice, the city architect Lambert Petterson designed the building in 1900 that is still in use today. Also a small jail was built on the island, which was altered into a chapel of East and West in 1995 and is a piece of art itself, designed by Ilkka Väätti. Viikinsaari has mostly been in use of the working class as their recreation space since the early 20th century. After some quieter years in the latter half of last century, the island is again in active use and attentively maintained.

The price for a round trip by a ferry from Laukontori is 16 euros for adults, 10 euros for children (4-17), 8 euros for students and pensioners and with 35 euros it's possible to have a family ticket for 2 adults and 4 kids. Tickets can be bought from the ticket kiosk at Laukontori harbour or online for a discount.

== Sources ==
- Information on the Viikinsaari Island on the City of Tampere webpage
