= Nalkala =

City district in Tampere, Finland

Coordinates: 61°29′40″N 23°45′20″E

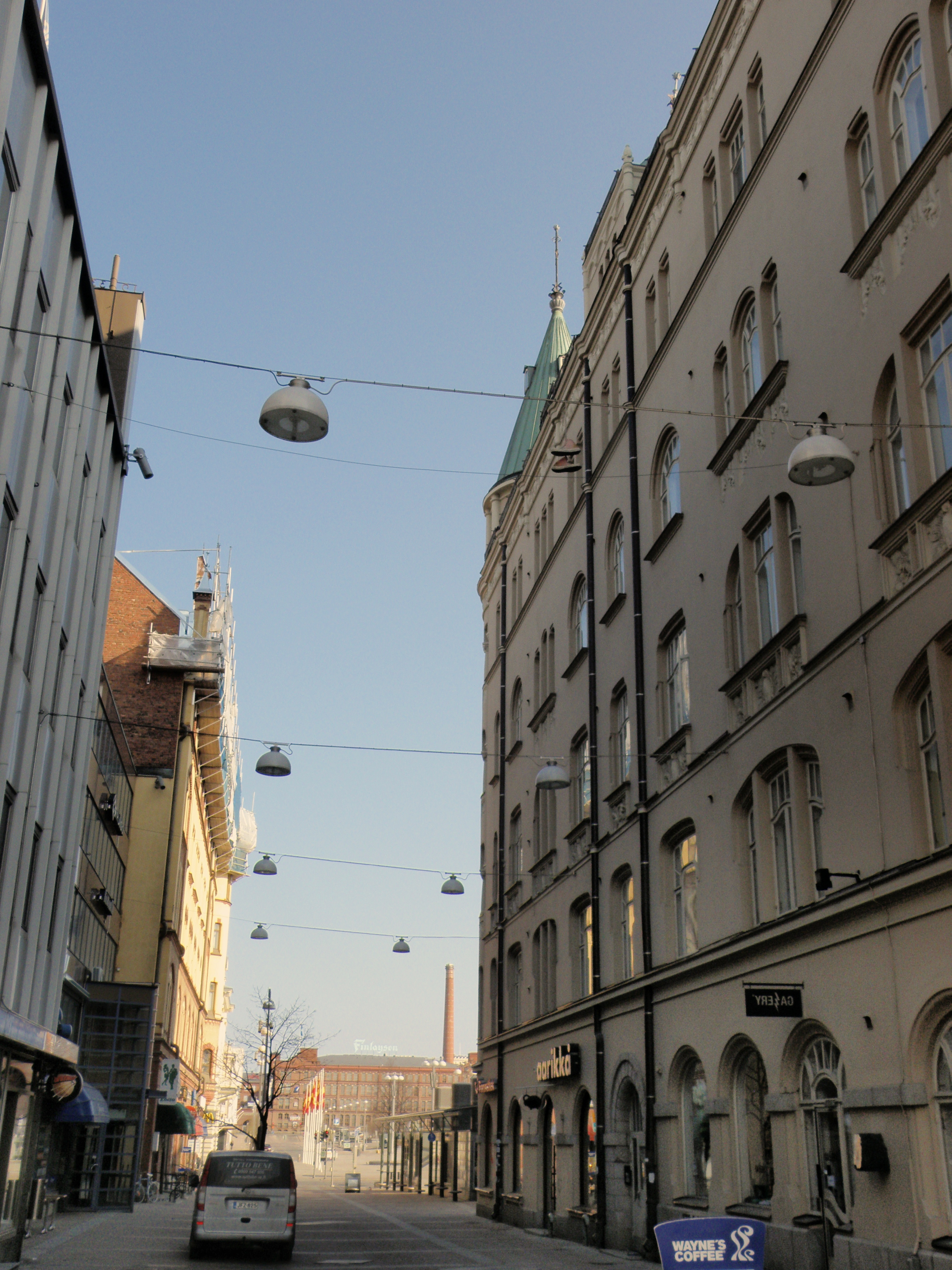
Aleksis Kiven katu in Nalkala

Nalkala is a neighbourhood in the city of Tampere, Finland, covering the southern part of the city center from Hämeenkatu to the Laukontori market square. The district is bordered by the lower reaches of Tammerkoski, the Ratina estuary, Lake Pyhäjärvi and to the west by Hämeenpuisto. The original 19th-century street names in the area still include Hämeenkatu, Hallituskatu and Kuninkaankatu, the latter been named after the founder of the city of Tampere, King Gustav III of Sweden. The area is named after two houses called Nalka, which were mentioned in the 1540 land register.
