= Laukontori =

Market square in Tampere, Finland

Coordinates: 61°29.7′N 023°45.6′E

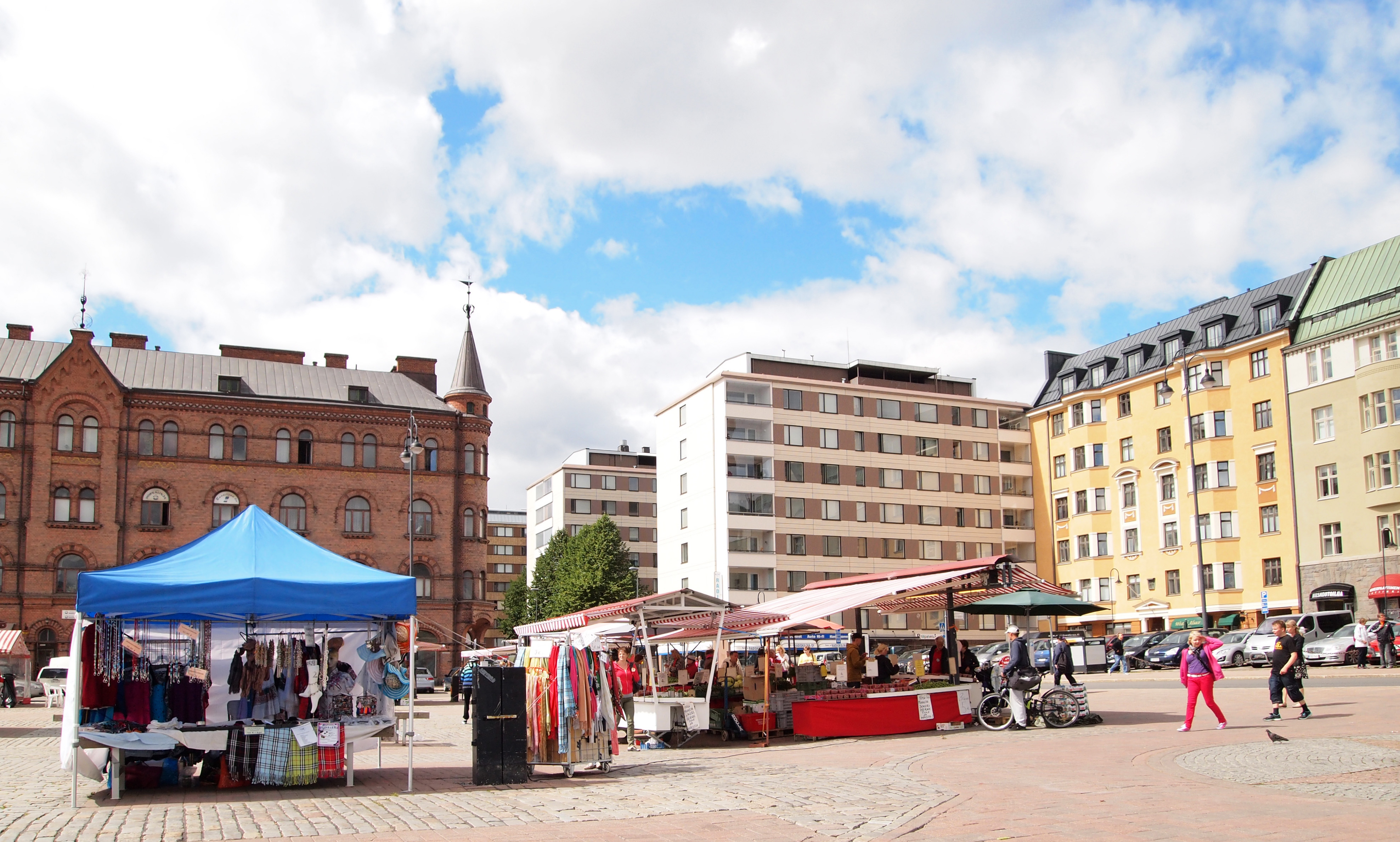
View on the Laukontori square in 2013

Laukontori (or the Laukko Square, also known as Alaranta) is a market square in the southern part of the city center of Tampere, Finland, on the shores of Lake Pyhäjärvi. It is located just a few hundred meters from Tampere Central Square. Square's beach serves as a harbor for cruise ships to the Viikinsaari island and the city of Hämeenlinna in the summer.

Laukontori got its name from the first steamboat sailing on Lake Pyhäjärvi, the Laukko paddle steamer, which was built in 1859 but scrapped as early as 1864. As such, the ship was so significant that the people of Tampere began to use the name Laukontori, or the square on which Laukko landed. The same berth was later used by another steamboat named Laukko. Alaranta and Alasatama have been used as parallel names for Laukontori, although on the other hand the port of the Mustalahti bay on the shores of Lake Näsijärvi has never been called Yläranta or Yläsatama. Laukontori has officially belonged to the Tampere street system in 1868–1886 and again since 1897. In the intervening years, the market was called Kalatori ("fish market square"). Residential apartment buildings were built on the outskirts of Laukontori in the early 20th century, and the area was a favorite residential area for wealthy city dwellers. In 1905, almost half of the residents of the entire Nalkala district were considered to belong to the highest social group. Until the 1950s, Laukontori was a lively trading place where rural residents who came to Tampere from the Lake Pyhäjärvi area sold their products on inland waterway vessels.

In addition to Tammelantori, Laukontori is also a famous "original" place to enjoy the mustamakkara black sausage. The Laukontori is led across the Tammerkoski by the Vuolteensilta bridge, completed in 1985, and the Laukonsilta bridge, completed in the summer of 2010, connects Laukontori and the Ratina district.

== See also ==
- Sori Square
- Tammelantori
