= Tampere City Central Office Building =

Building in Tampere, Finland

Coordinates: 61°29′56.3″N 23°45′34.3″E

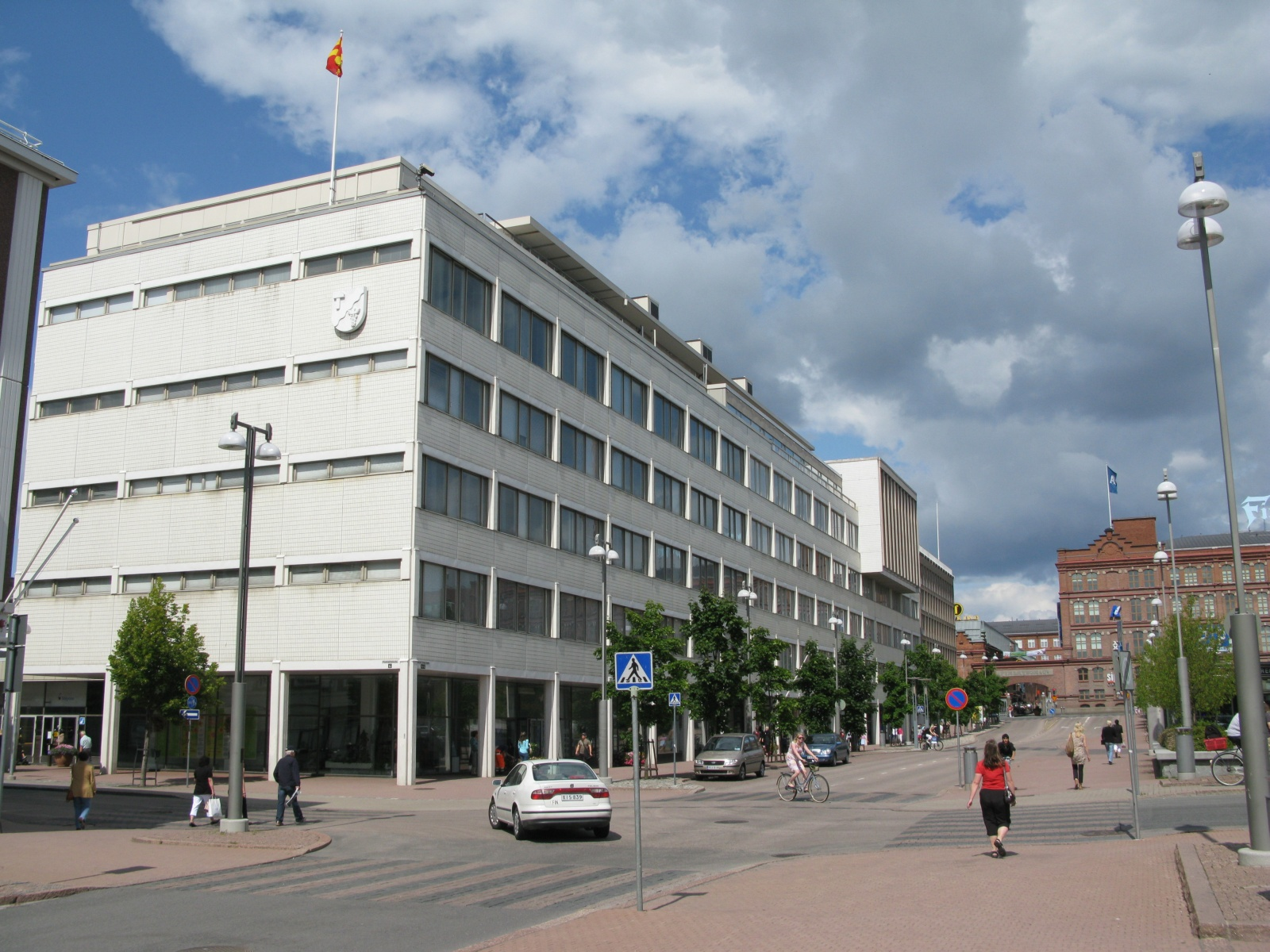
The Tampere City Central Office Building in July 2009

The Tampere City Central Office Building (Finnish: Tampereen keskusvirastotalo; the so-called "White House") is an office building in Tampere, Finland, located on the edge of Tampere Central Square and the city's administrative center. Among other things, the council hall is located there.

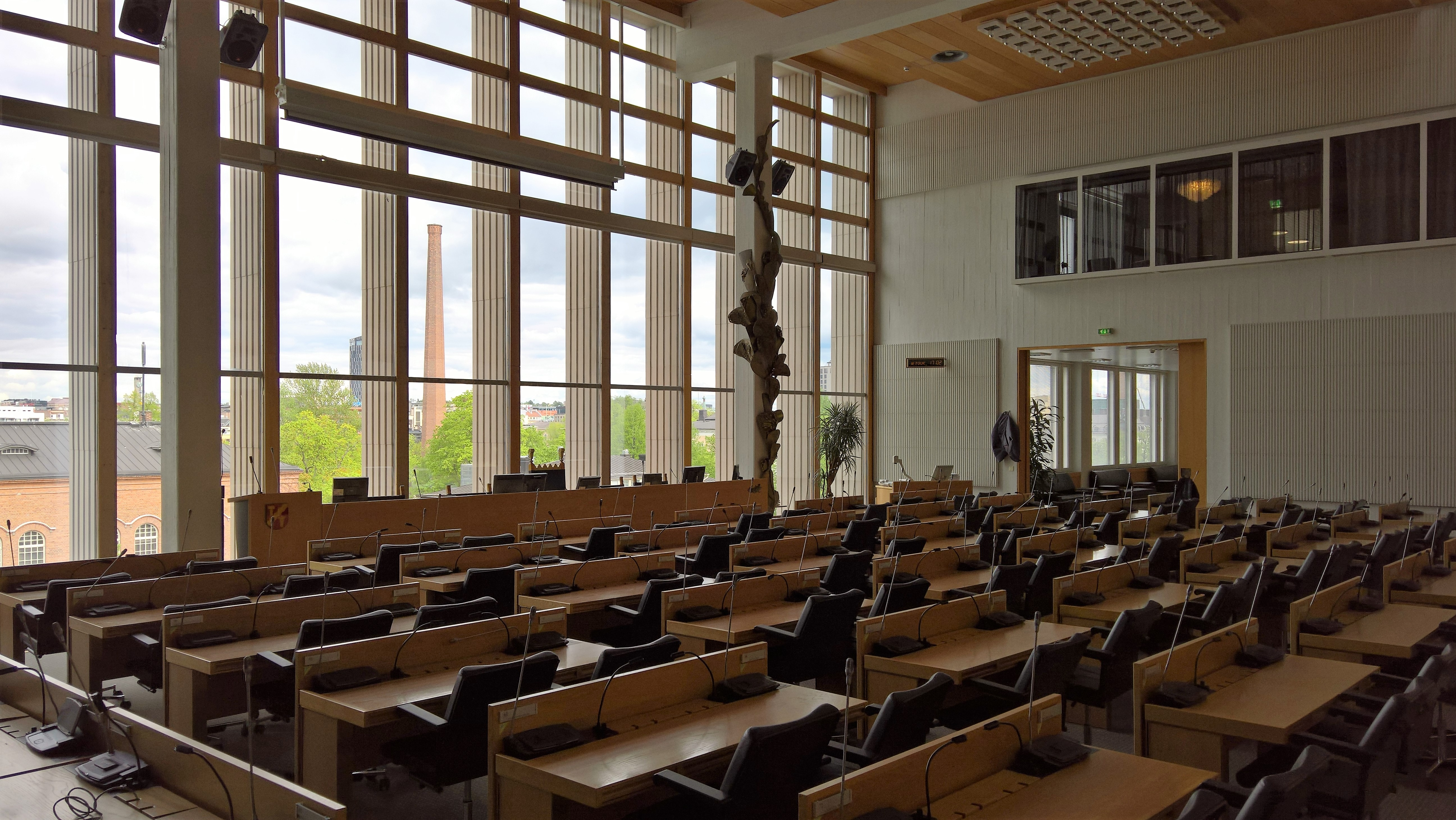
The council hall of the City Council of Tampere

The office building was designed by architect Aarne Ervi. It was built in two phases: the first, the southern part was completed in 1967 and the northern extension in 1975. The building is protected cultural property by a town plan in 2009. Opposite the office building is Frenckell's former factory property, which is also used by the city's offices.

The Central Office Building is one of the most significant representatives of modern architecture in the center of Tampere. The light color of the façade, the strip-like windows, the street-level pillars and the partial roof terrace are typical of functionalism. The layout is reminiscent of an ordinary office building, but the council hall, which protrudes from the façade, adds a distinctive character and feel to the administration building. The restaurant, lobby and public areas are spacious and bright. The exterior of the building is almost in its original appearance, but major alterations have been made to the interior. The original appearance of the council hall has been well preserved.

== See also ==
- City Council of Tampere
- Tampere City Hall
