= Radio Dei =

Coordinates: 60.204377°N 24.899517°E

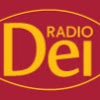

Helsinki; Finland
- Broadcast area: Finland

Programming
- Format: Christian radio

Ownership
- Owner: Kristillinen Media Oy

History
- First air date: 1997; 28 years ago

Links
- Webcast: Listen live
- Website: Radio Dei

Radio Dei (Radiance of God, Radio of God) is a Christian radio station in Finland. It broadcasts on 89.0 MHz in the Greater Helsinki metropolitan area, and simulcasts on other frequencies in most other major Finnish cities. Radio Dei also simulcasts over the Internet, through its website.

== Programming ==
In addition to broadcasting Christian music, Radio Dei offers STT news every hour, and general talk radio programs. In particular, the station's most listened-to programs are Taivaan ja Maan väliltä (English: Between Heaven and Earth), by Patmos Lähetyssäätiö broadcast on Saturday late evenings, and Raamattu kannesta kanteen (English: Bible from beginning to end), by the Sanansaattajat missionary organization.
