= 2029 Finnish municipal elections =

The 2029 Finnish municipal elections will be held on the 15h of April 2029, the same day as the 2029 county elections. On that day, the representatives for the 308 municipal councils will be elected.

== Electoral system ==
The right to vote in municipal elections is determined by the municipality in which a person is registered fifty-one days before the election. In addition, they must be at least 18 years old by election day and meet one of the following conditions:

- Finnish citizen
- Citizen of another EU member state who resides in a municipality of Finland
- Citizen of a country other than the above who has had a continuous residence in a municipality of Finland for at least 2 years (i.e. 51 days before election day)
- Employed by an EU or international organisation operating in Finland and residing in a municipality of Finland on the 51st day before election day, provided that their information has been stored in the Finnish population data information system at their request and that they have notified the Digital and Population Data Services Agency in writing no later than the fifty-second day before election day that they wish to exercise their right to vote in the upcoming municipal elections.
