= Ilmari Nurminen =

Finnish politician (born 1991)

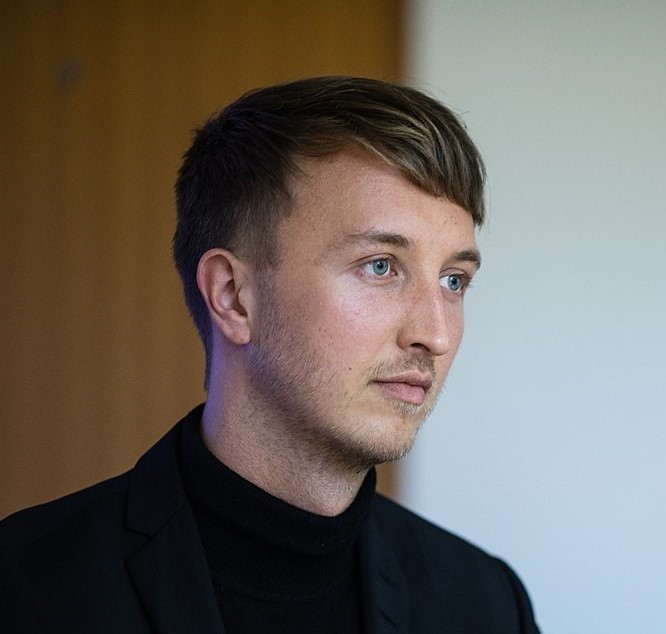
- Nurminen in 2020

Member of the Finnish Parliament for Pirkanmaa

Mayor of Tampere
- Incumbent
- Assumed office 2 June 2025

Personal details
- Born: February 24, 1991 (age 35) Vammala, Pirkanmaa, Finland
- Party: Social Democratic Party of Finland
- Website: https://www.meidanilmari.fi

Ilmari Taisto Nurminen (born 24 February 1991 in Vammala) is a Finnish politician currently serving in the Parliament of Finland for the Social Democratic Party of Finland at the Pirkanmaa constituency. He currently serves as the mayor of Tampere.

In August 2021 Nurminen was nominated as the chair of the Tampere City Council for one election period.

In the 2025 Finnish municipal elections, Nurminen was the Tampere mayoral candidate for the Social Democratic Party (SDP). SDP won the election in Tampere; Nurminen is therefore likely the next mayor of the city. Due to this, he has been relieved of his post as member of the parliament of Finland from June 2025.

== Political career ==
In 2013, Nurminen was elected to the City Executive Board of Sastamala, where he served as the vice chairperson. In the 2015 Finnish parliamentary election, he received 5079 votes from the Pirkanmaa electoral district earning him a seat in Parliament. At 24, Nurminen became the youngest member of the new Parliament and the first member in general to be born in the 1990s. He was re-elected in 2019 with 9712 votes and again in 2023. In 2020, he officially relocated from Sastamala to Tampere.

Nurminen is known to especially advocate the rights of the elderly. Nurminen has had a loyal group behind him from the very beginning, mostly consisting of women older than him. For example, in September 2024, Nurminen raised concerns about the availability and adequacy of care for the elderly.

In Parliament, Nurminen began serving as the chair of the Parliamentary Music Network in 2019. In April 2021, Nurminen started as the Vice-Chair of the Parliamentary LGBT Network, "sateenkaariverkosto". In addition, Nurminen also leads the Parliamentary IKÄ Network.

Nurminen made headlines in 2021 when he, as chair of the Parliamentary Music Network, organized an event for the music industry alongside prime minister Sanna Marin and the minister of science and culture Antti Kurvinen. The event was held in the official residence of the prime minister in Kesäranta, Helsinki. Later, it was brought to light that the event had generated a ~3000 euro bill for taxpayers. Parliament had intended to cut spending on the industry.
