= Tampere City Hall =

Building in Tampere, Finland

Coordinates: 61.4980°N 23.7593°E

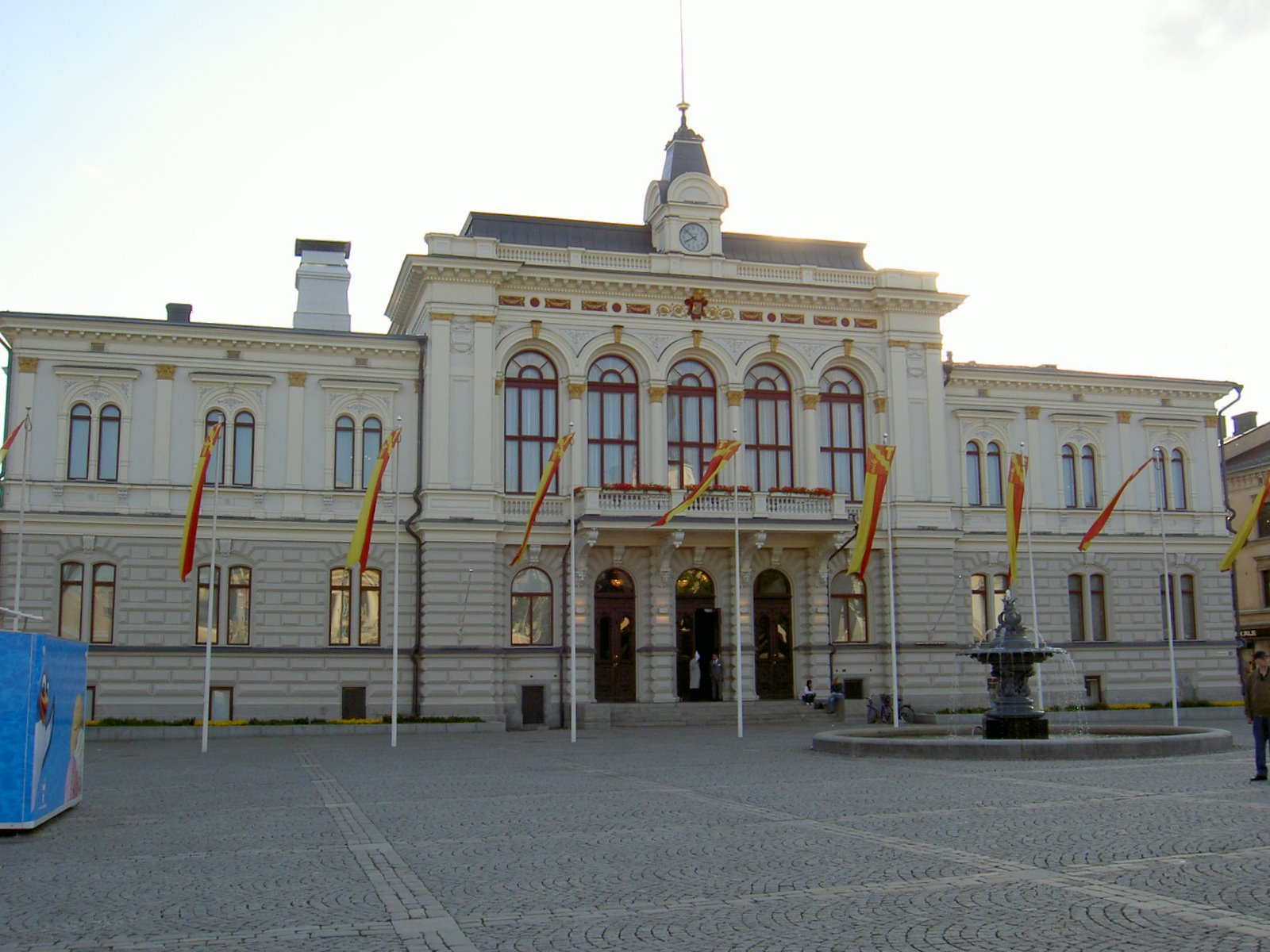
The Tampere City Hall on the edge of the Tampere Central Square. In the front of the building are the banners of the city of Tampere.

The Tampere City Hall (Finnish: Tampereen Raatihuone; Swedish: Tammerfors rådhus) is a Neo-Renaissance building in Tampere, Finland, situated at the edge of the Tampere Central Square. The current city hall was built in 1890 and was designed by Georg Schreck. The palacial building has many halls and the city of Tampere holds many events there. During the Great Strike in 1905, the so-called "Red Manifest" was read from the balcony of the Tampere City Hall.

== See also ==
- Tampere City Central Office Building
