= Building at 202–204 Charles Street =

- U.S. National Register of Historic Places
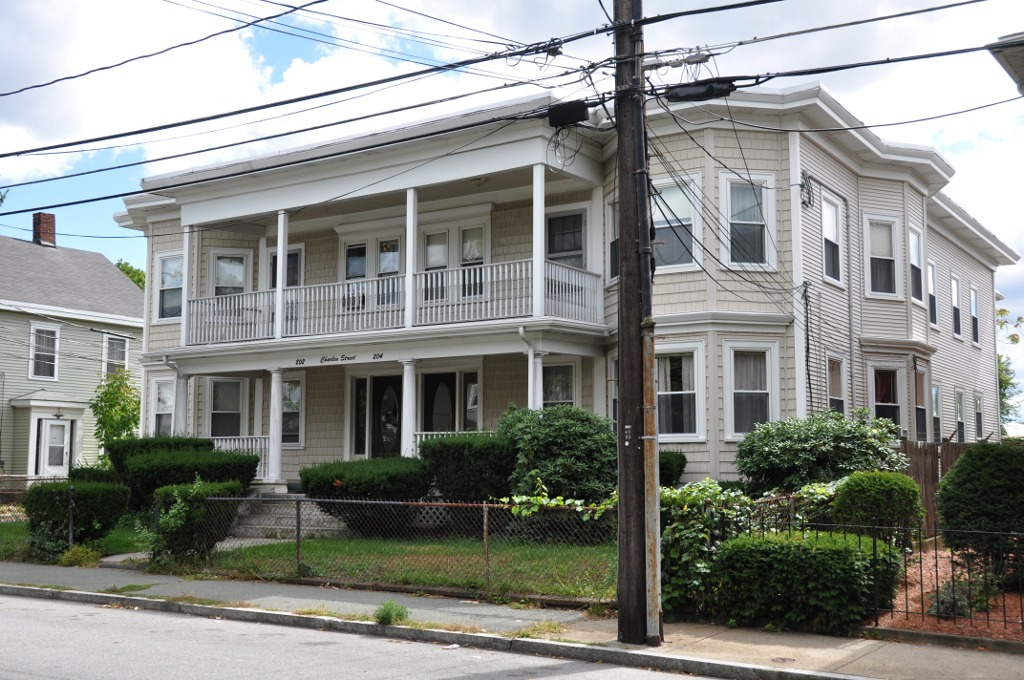

- Location within Massachusetts Location within the United States
- Location: 202–204 Charles St., Waltham, Massachusetts
- Coordinates: 42°22′24″N 71°14′45″W
- Area: less than one acre
- Built: 1913
- Architectural style: Colonial Revival
- MPS: Waltham MRA
- NRHP reference No.: 89001493
- Added to NRHP: September 28, 1989

The building at 202–204 Charles Street in Waltham, Massachusetts is a well-preserved example of multi-unit residential housing built in the city in the early decades of the 20th century. It was built in 1913, and was listed on the National Register of Historic Places in 1989.

== Description and history ==
Charles Street is a secondary east-west road on the west side of downtown Waltham, running roughly midway between Main Street (United States Route 20) and the Charles River. 202-204 Charles Street is on the south side of the street, roughly midway between Prospect and Floyd Streets, in an area densely built with other residential properties. The main building is set near the street, with a five-bay garage at the rear of the property. The main building is 2-1/2 stories in height, of wood-frame construction, and is covered with a flat roof and aluminum siding. Despite the application of siding, it retains a number of well-preserved Colonial Revival features, including pillared supports and turned balusters on its two-level porch, flanking projecting bays on both sides of the porch, and an extended cornice; modillions once found on the cornice have been removed. The two entrances are identical, with doors that have oval windows framed by sidelight windows.

The house was built in 1913 for Henry Milesky, a resident elsewhere on Charles Street, and has historically been a rental property. Most of its documented occupants have been in working-class professions. Its construction took place near a peak in the city's growth, most of which had taken place in the 19th century, spurred by the Boston Manufacturing Company and the Waltham Watch Company.

== See also ==
- National Register of Historic Places listings in Waltham, Massachusetts
