= Tampere Central Square =

Square in Tampere, Finland

Coordinates: 61°29.89′N 23°45.65′E

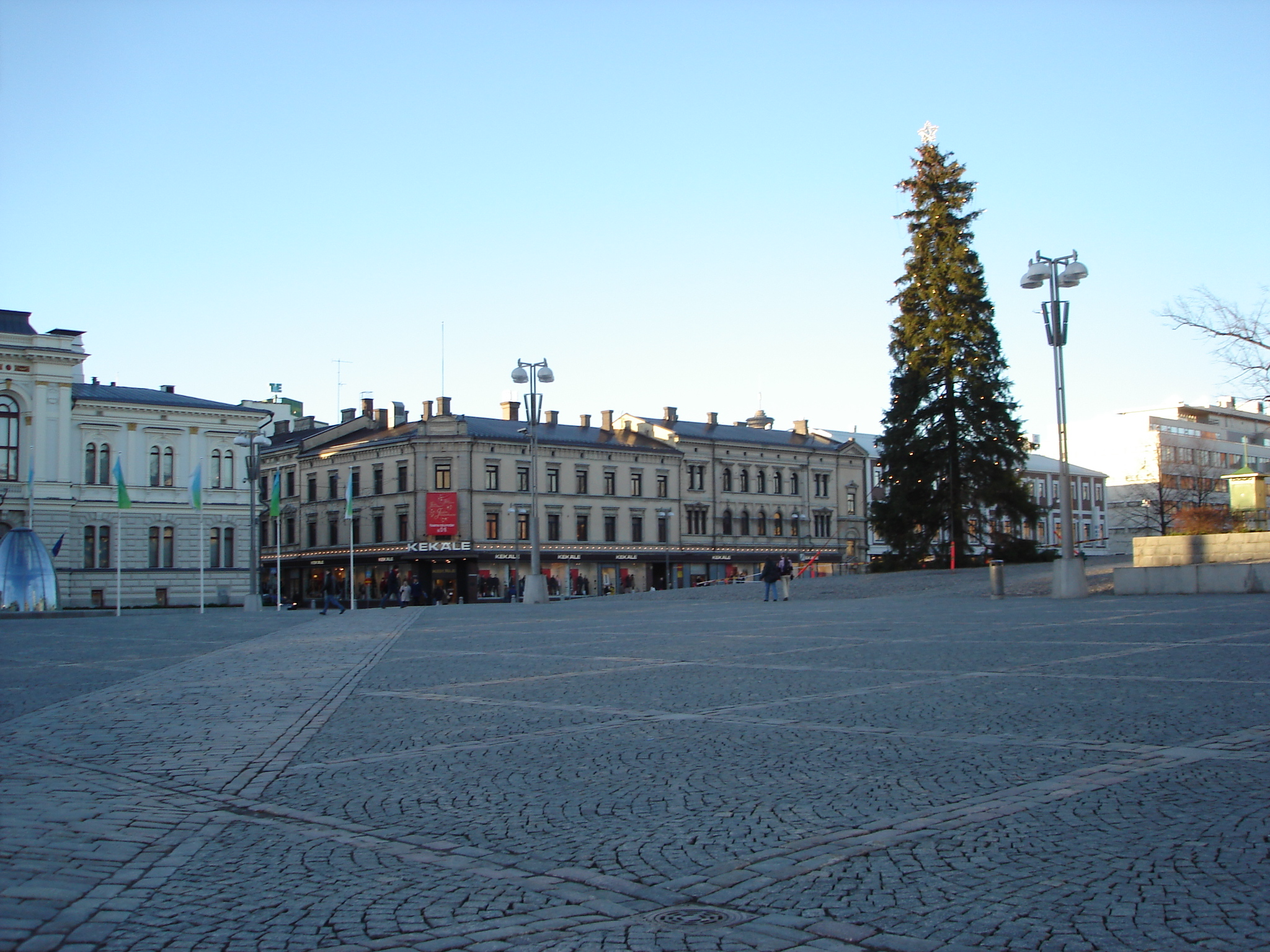
Tampere Central Square

The Tampere Central Square (Finnish: Keskustori) is a public square in the centre of Tampere, Finland, along the main street Hämeenkatu. The Central Square is located on the western shore of Tammerkoski and many important buildings in Tampere are located near it. These include the Tampere City Hall, the Tampere City Central Office Building, the Old Church of Tampere and the Tampere Theatre. The Central Square was called Kauppatori ("Market Square") until 1936.

== See also ==
- Tammelantori
