= Central Square Historic District (Waltham, Massachusetts) =

Historic district in Massachusetts, United States

- U.S. National Register of Historic Places
- U.S. Historic district
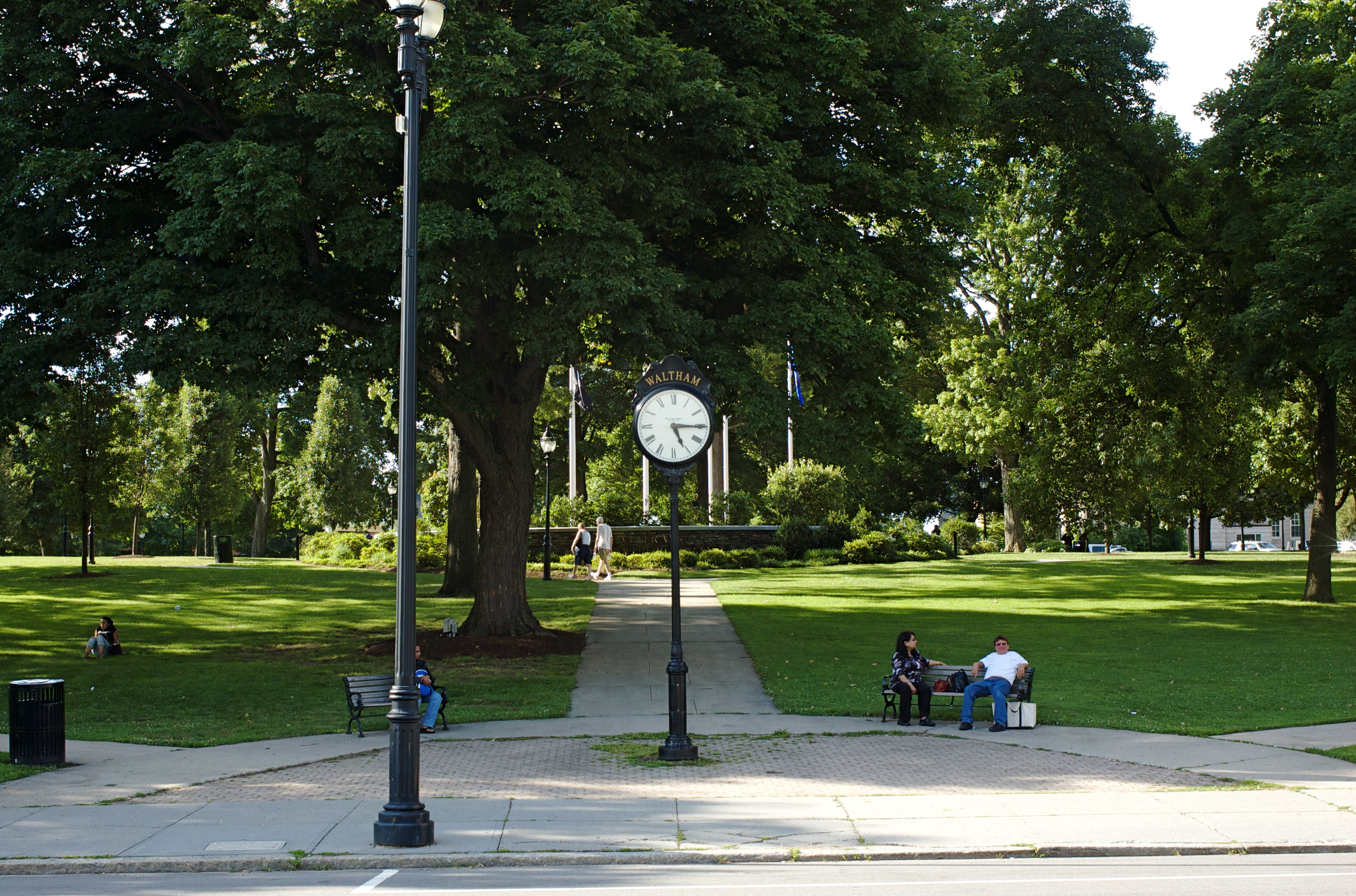

- Location within Massachusetts Location within the United States
- Location: Roughly bounded by Church, Carter, Moody, Main and Lexington Sts., Waltham, Massachusetts
- Coordinates: 42°22′32″N 71°14′10″W
- Area: 6.34 acres (2.57 ha)
- Architect: Hartwell and Richardson; Et al.
- Architectural style: Colonial Revival, Late Victorian
- MPS: Waltham MRA
- NRHP reference No.: 89001526
- Added to NRHP: September 28, 1989

The Central Square Historic District is a historic district encompassing the central town common of the city of Waltham, Massachusetts, and several commercial buildings facing the common or in its immediate vicinity. The common is bounded by Carter, Moody, Main, and Elm Streets; the district includes fourteen buildings, which are located on Main, Elm, Lexington, and Church Streets, on the north and east side of the common. The district was listed on the National Register of Historic Places in 1989.

Although Waltham was settled in the 17th century and incorporated as a town in 1738, it had no recognizable town center until the 1830s, when the nearby Boston Manufacturing Company gave the town the land that now serves as its central square. The area was further enhanced as a central location by the arrival of the railroad, and the construction of the Moody Street bridge across the Charles River, both in the 1840s. Waltham was incorporated as a city in 1884. Its City Hall, a 1924–26 Georgian Revival building designed by William Rogers Greely, stands on the common at the corner of Main and Elm Streets. The oldest municipal building in the district is the 1887 fire station at 25 Lexington Street; it is a brick Queen Anne structure designed by local architect Samuel Patch. It stands next to the 1890 police station building, designed by Hartwell & Richardson. A row of commercial buildings stand across Main Street, facing the common. Many of these were designed by architect Henry W. Hartwell, as was the Music Hall building at 15 Elm Street. Most of these buildings were built between 1880 and 1920.

== Waltham Common ==
The common itself is a rectangular area about 2.4 acres (0.97 ha) in size, out of which a smaller rectangle has been cut where City Hall is located. It is planted with mature trees, and has a network of paths as well as four major monuments. The oldest is a granite obelisk with urn designed by George F. Meacham and placed in 1867. A statue of native son, Governor of Massachusetts, and American Civil War General Nathaniel Prentice Banks, designed by Henry Hudson Kitson was placed in 1909, and a copy of "The Hiker", a memorial to veterans of the Spanish–American War, designed by Kitson's wife Theodora, was placed in the early 20th century. Within the Veterans Memorial Mall stands a lectern erected in 1973 commemorating Samuel M. Shriberg, a local business owner who founded Support Our Servicemen. Lastly, a memorial celebrating the city's centennial was placed in 1984.

Within Waltham Common

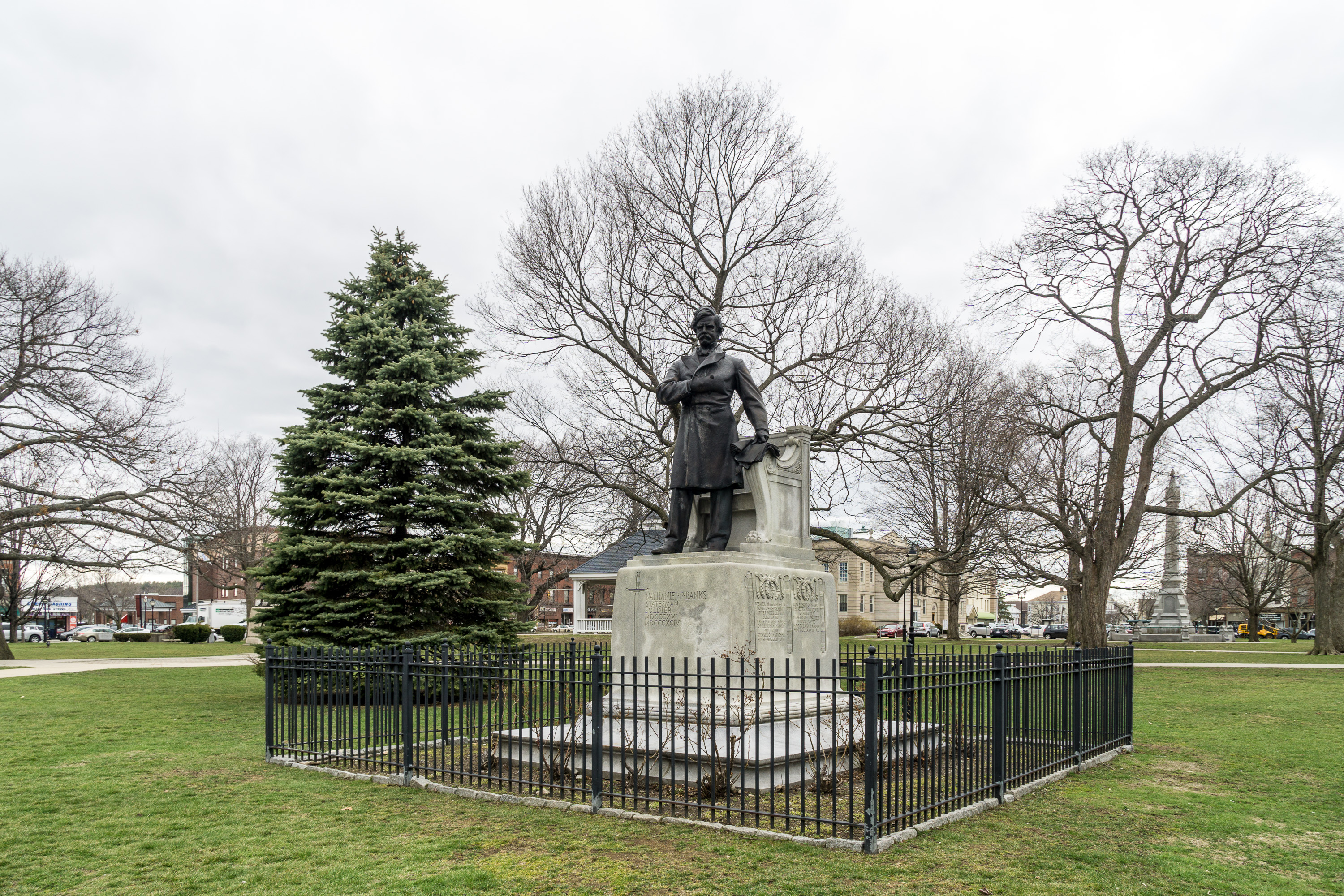
Nathaniel P. Banks statue

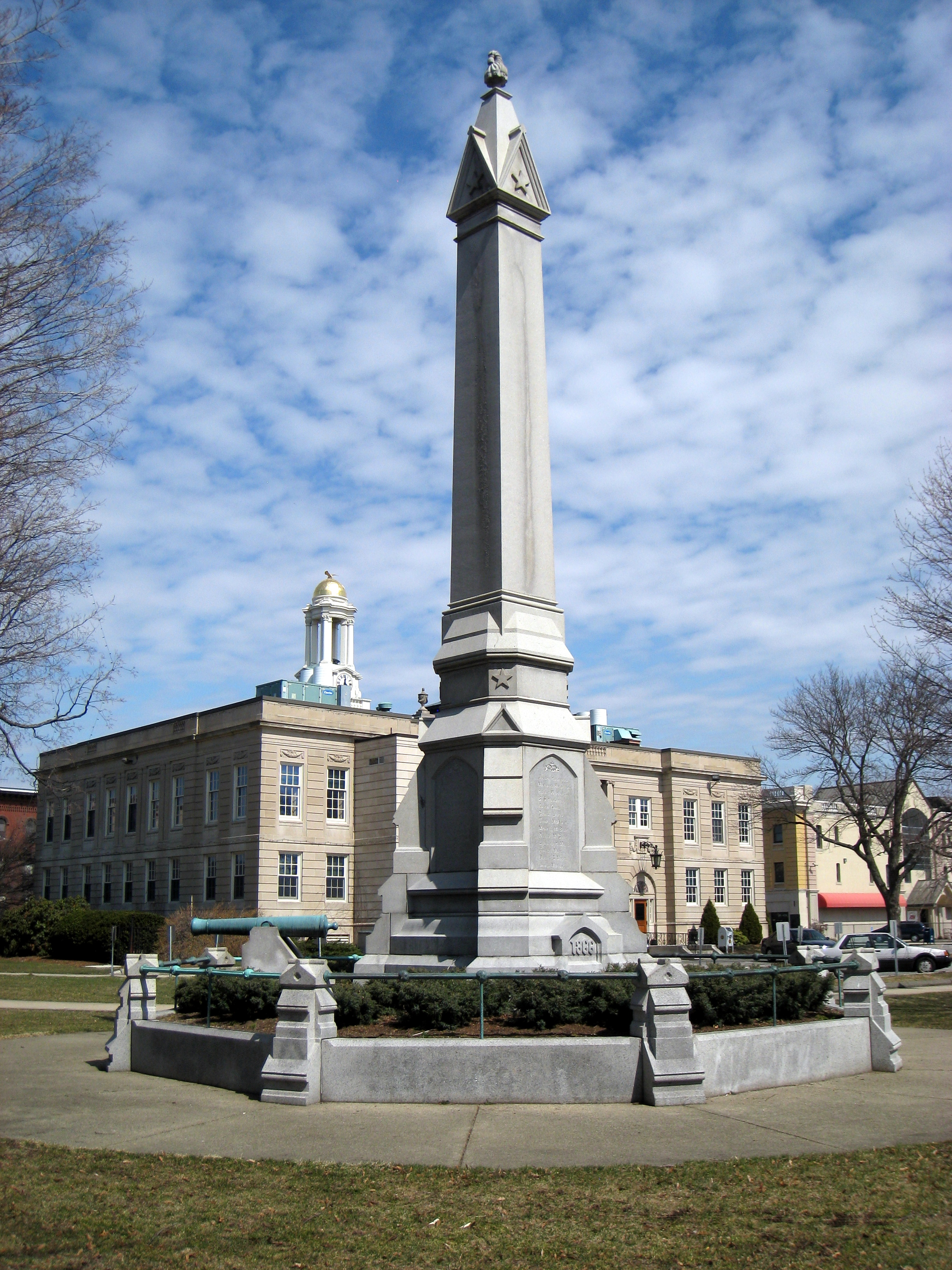
Civil War Monument and Town Hall

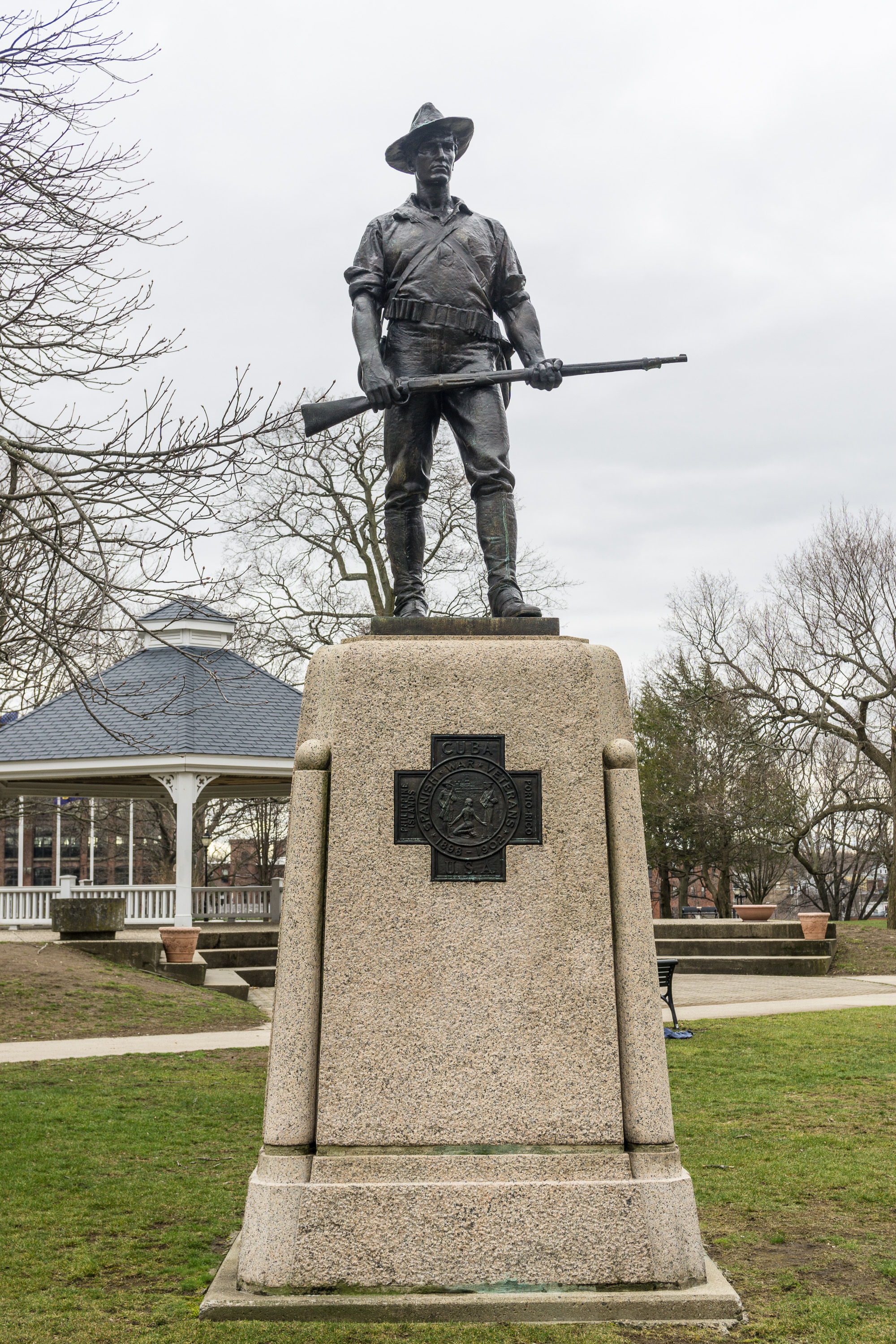
The Hiker

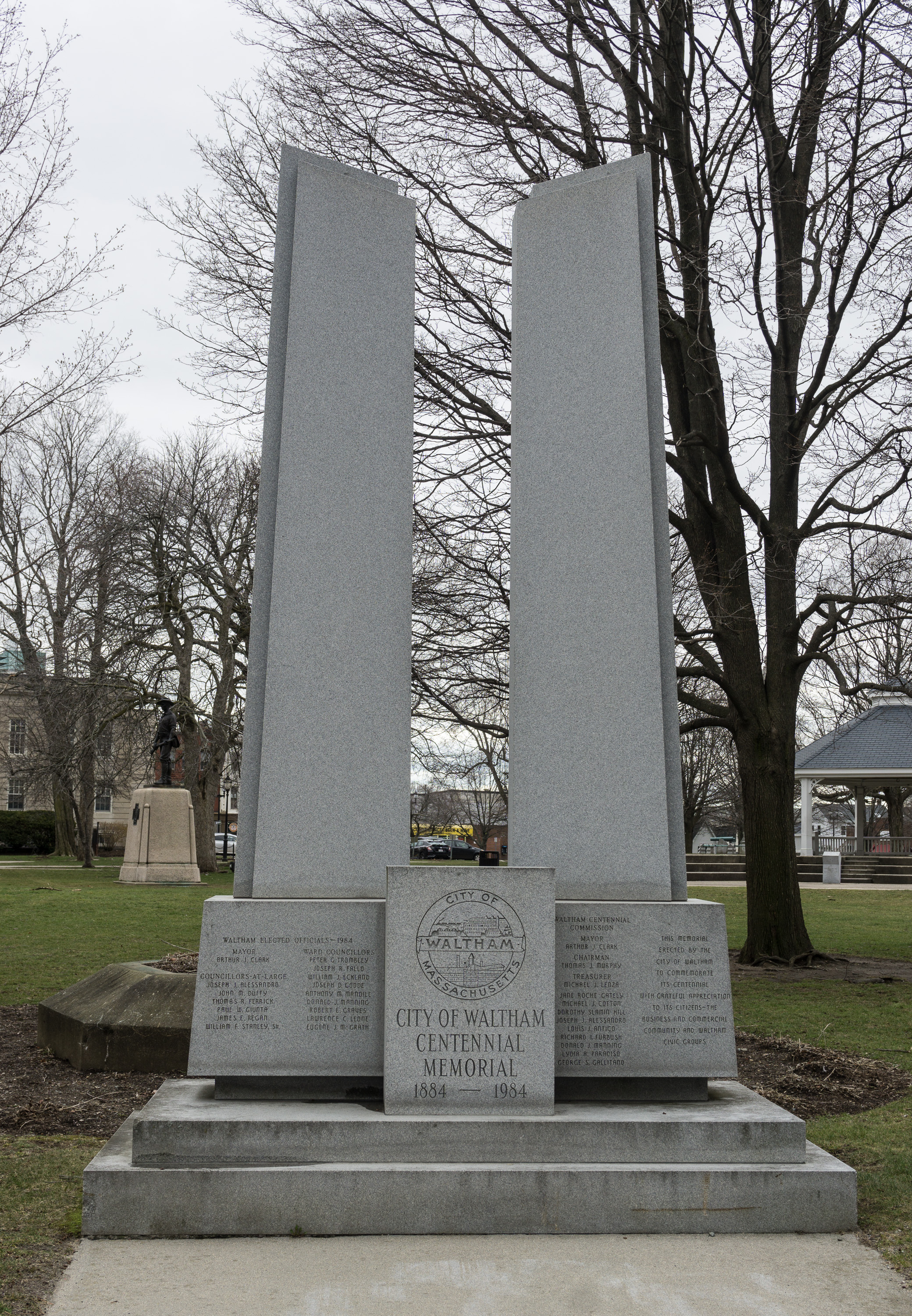
Waltham Centennial Memorial

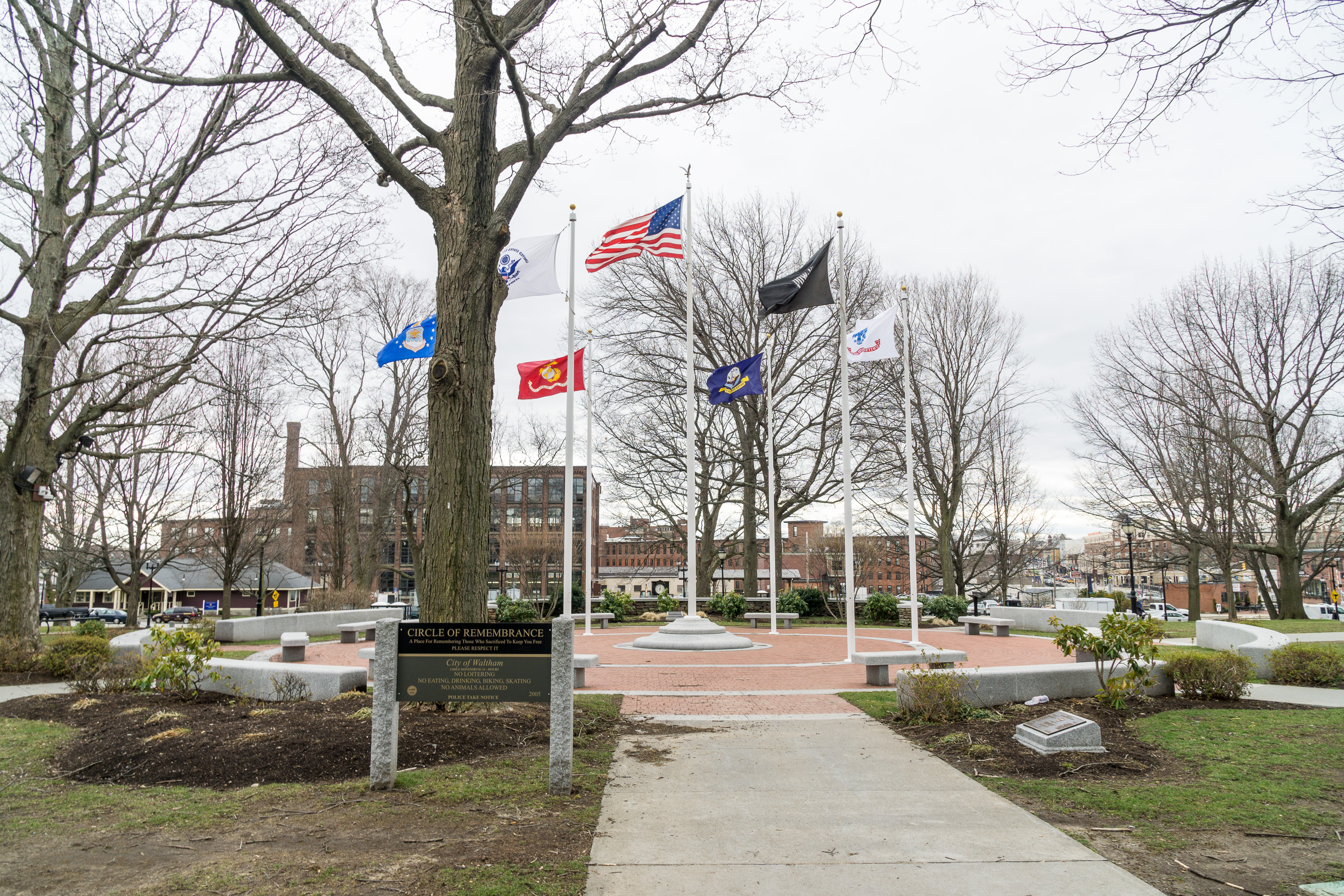
Circle of Remembrance

== See also ==
- National Register of Historic Places listings in Waltham, Massachusetts
