= Old Church =

Old Church may refer to:

- Old Church, New Jersey, United States
- Helsinki Old Church, Finland
- Tampere Old Church, Finland
- The Old Church (Portland, Oregon), United States
- Old Church, County Antrim, a townland in Tickmacrevan, County Antrim, Northern Ireland
- Old Church Formation, a geologic formation from the eastern united states dating to the Oligocene Epoch

== See also ==
- Oude Kerk (disambiguation), Dutch for "Old Church"
