= Helsingin pitäjä =

Helsingin pitäjä may refer to:

- the former name of the Finnish city of Vantaa
- Helsingin pitäjän kirkonkylä, a district of Vantaa
- Helsingin pitäjä, an annual book series published by the Vantaa-Seura about the history of Vantaa
