= Oude Kerk =

Oude Kerk (Dutch: "Old Church") may refer to:

- Oude Kerk, Amsterdam
- Oude Kerk (Delft)

== See also ==
- Old Church (disambiguation)
