= Helsinki Old Church =

Old Church
- Finnish: Vanha kirkko Swedish: Gamla kyrkan
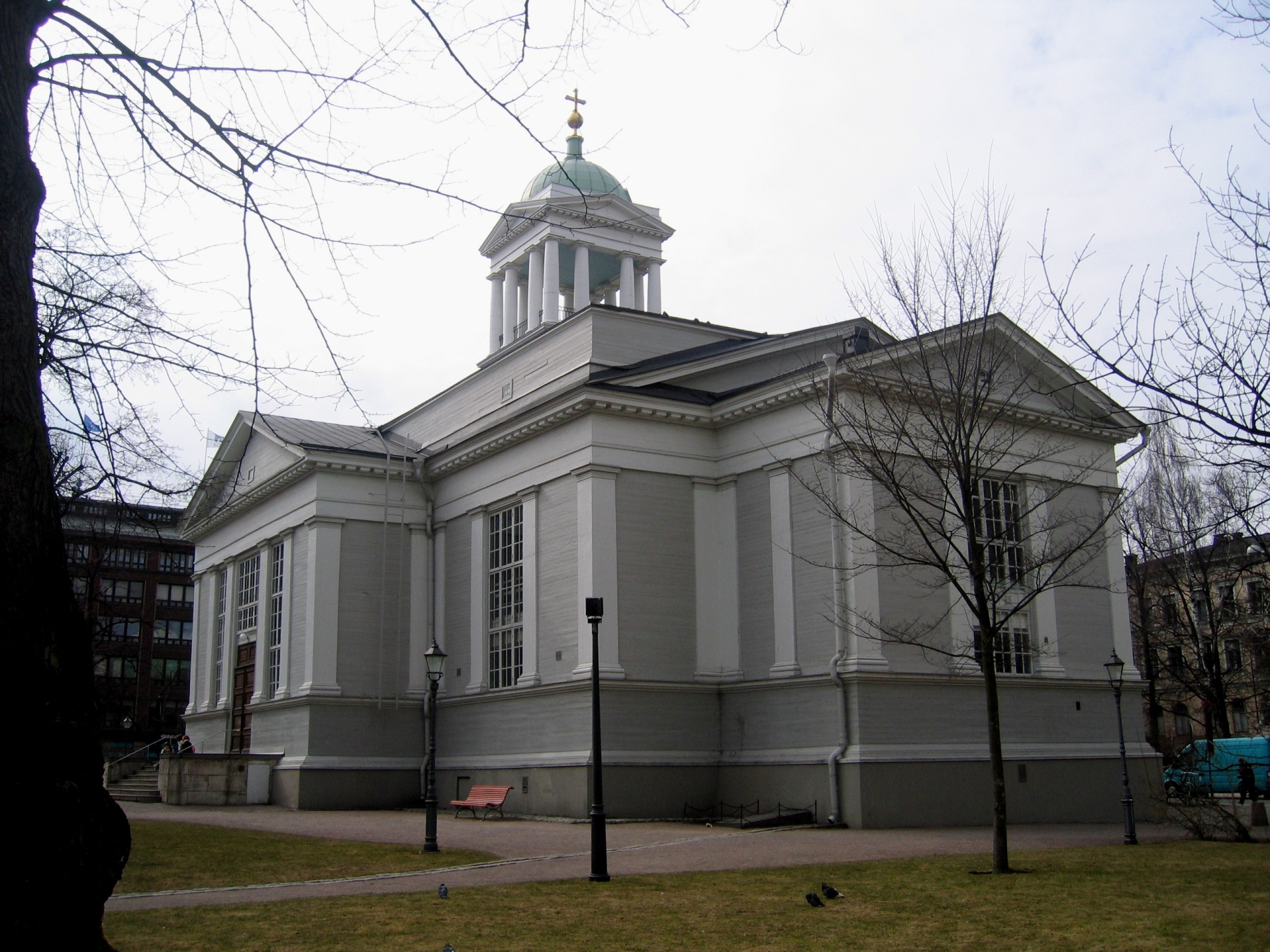
- Old Church
- 60°09′59″N 24°56′21″E
- Location: Helsinki
- Country: Finland
- Denomination: Lutheran
- Website: www.helsinginkirkot.fi/en/churches/old-church

History
- Consecrated: 1826

Architecture
- Architect: Carl Ludvig Engel
- Style: Neoclassical

Administration
- Diocese: Helsinki

The Old Church of Helsinki (Finnish: Helsingin vanha kirkko, Swedish: Gamla kyrkan i Helsingfors), designed by Carl Ludvig Engel and completed in 1826, is an Evangelical Lutheran church in Helsinki. The oldest existing church in central Helsinki, the church was originally planned as a temporary building as the Ulrika Eleonora Church constructed in 1727 had become too small for the congregation and the new church, Helsinki Cathedral, would not be completed until 1852. However, the city's rapid population growth from the early 19th century onwards ensured that the church would remain needed, and also necessitated the construction of many other churches.

== History ==
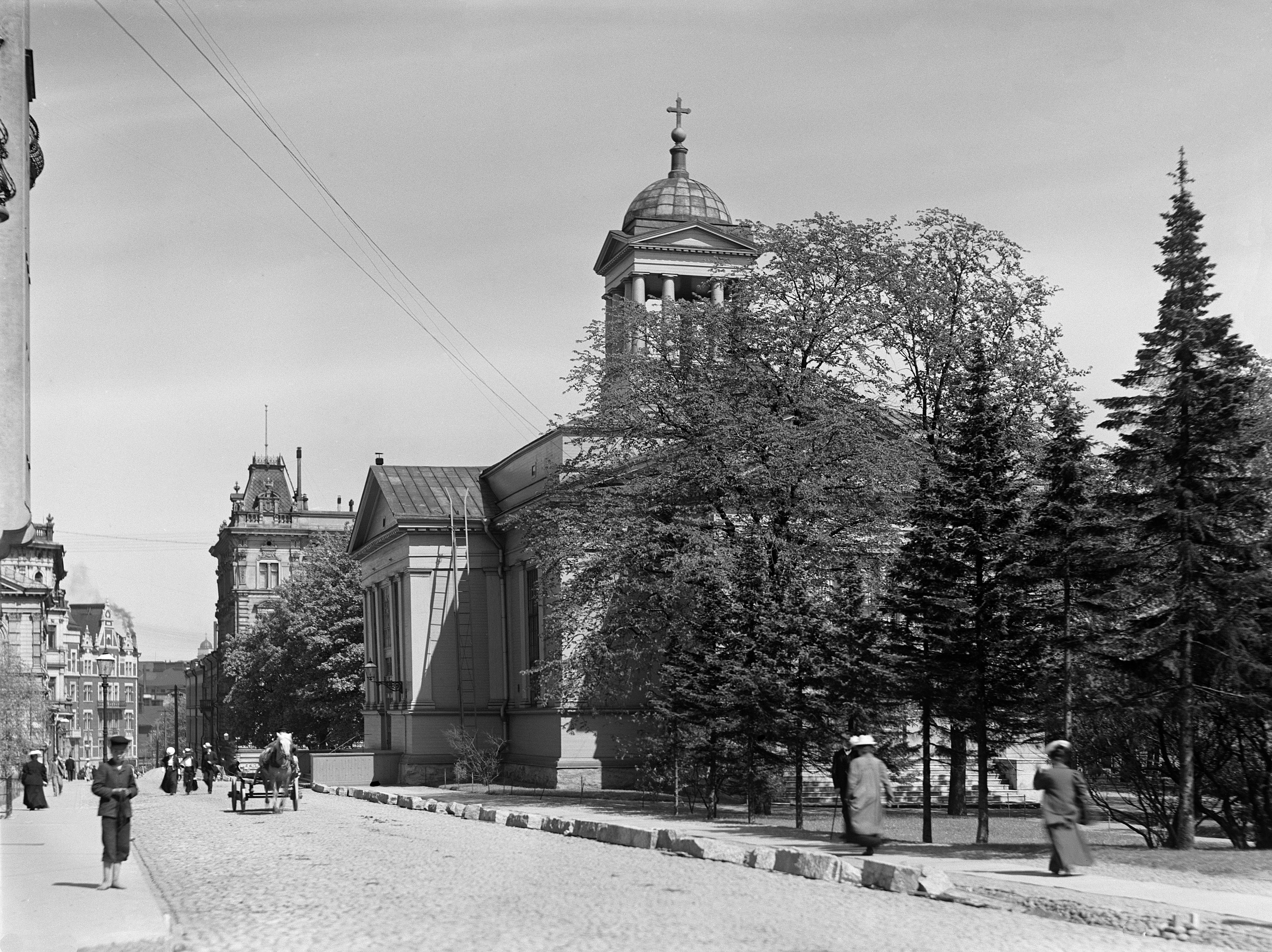
Helsinki Old Church in 1908.

The neoclassical wooden church was built under Engel's supervision between 1824 and 1826 and consecrated on 17 December 1826 by dean Johan Borgström. When the Ulrika Eleonora Church was demolished, the recovered building materials and part of the movables were auctioned but some of the furnishings including the pulpit, benches and chandeliers as well as the organ were relocated to the newly built church. These furnishings were however replaced over the years with the exception of the pulpit. A new 36 stop organ built by Per Larsson Åkermann was installed in 1869.

The altarpiece painted by Robert Wilhelm Ekman was initially commissioned for Helsinki Cathedral, but was instead placed in the Old Church in 1854.

== Park ==
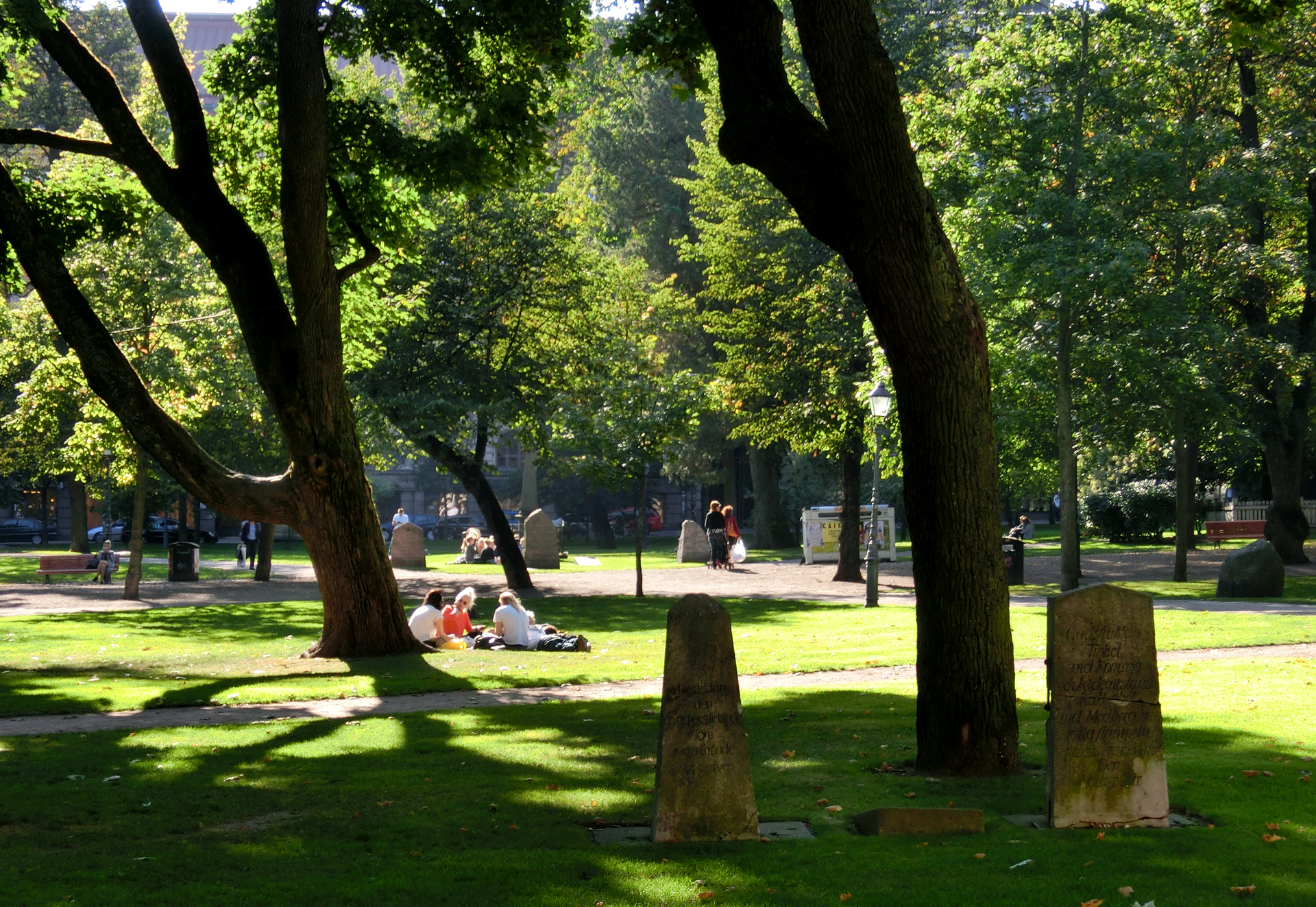
Old Church Park, also known as the "Plague Park"

The church is located in a recreational park maintained by the city and called Old Church Park (Finnish: Vanha kirkkopuisto).

The park is sometimes colloquially called Plague Park (Finnish: Ruttopuisto) as over a thousand victims of the 1710 plague are buried next to the park. The park itself was a cemetery from the 1780s until shortly after the church's construction. Its use as a graveyard was discontinued when the Hietaniemi Cemetery was consecrated in 1829, although some victims of the Finnish Civil War and fallen Finnish volunteers of the Estonian War of Independence were buried there in 1918 and 1919, respectively. Some 40 gravestones and memorials, as well as the tomb of Johan Sederholm, remain.

== See also ==
- St. Lawrence Church, Vantaa
- Tampere Old Church
