= Church of St. Lawrence, Lohja =

Medieval church in Lohja, Finland

Coordinates: 60.2531°N 24.0678°E

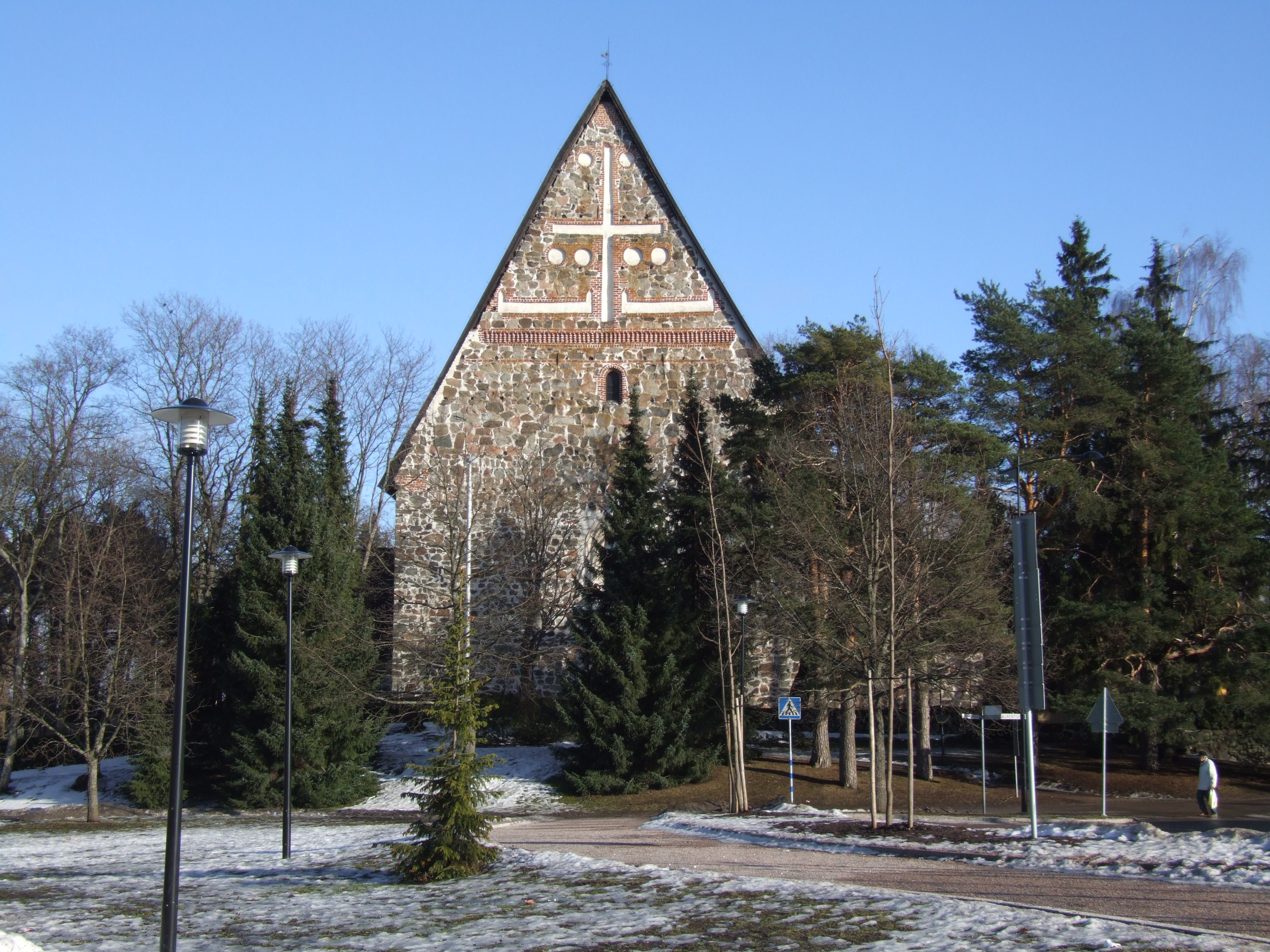
Lohja Church seen from the East.

The Church of St. Lawrence (Finnish: Lohjan Pyhän Laurin kirkko, Swedish: Sankt Lars kyrka) is a church in Lohja, Finland. It is the third largest medieval parish church in Finland. The murals from the early 16th century make it one of the most valuable medieval buildings in Finland. The rustic and naive murals depicted biblical stories for the illiterate population.

== Description ==
Prior to the Protestant Reformation and the introduction of Lutheranism into Finland, the church served the Roman Catholic Church. The church is dedicated to Lawrence of Rome.

On the southeast corner of the church is a bell tower. Its grey stone foot is probably from the Middle Ages. The wooden parts of the bell tower were given their present form during the vast reparations after the Great Northern War. The construction of the upper part was overseen by German master builder Johann Friedrich Schultz around year 1740. The tower houses three bells, the oldest of which was cast in Tallinn in 1594. The largest of the bells was cast in Lohja in 1624 and the smallest was cast in Stockholm in 1740.

In early 19th century the church windows were made larger and the paintings were covered with white chalk colour. In 1880s the white paint was removed and colourful figures were repaired.

== Gallery ==
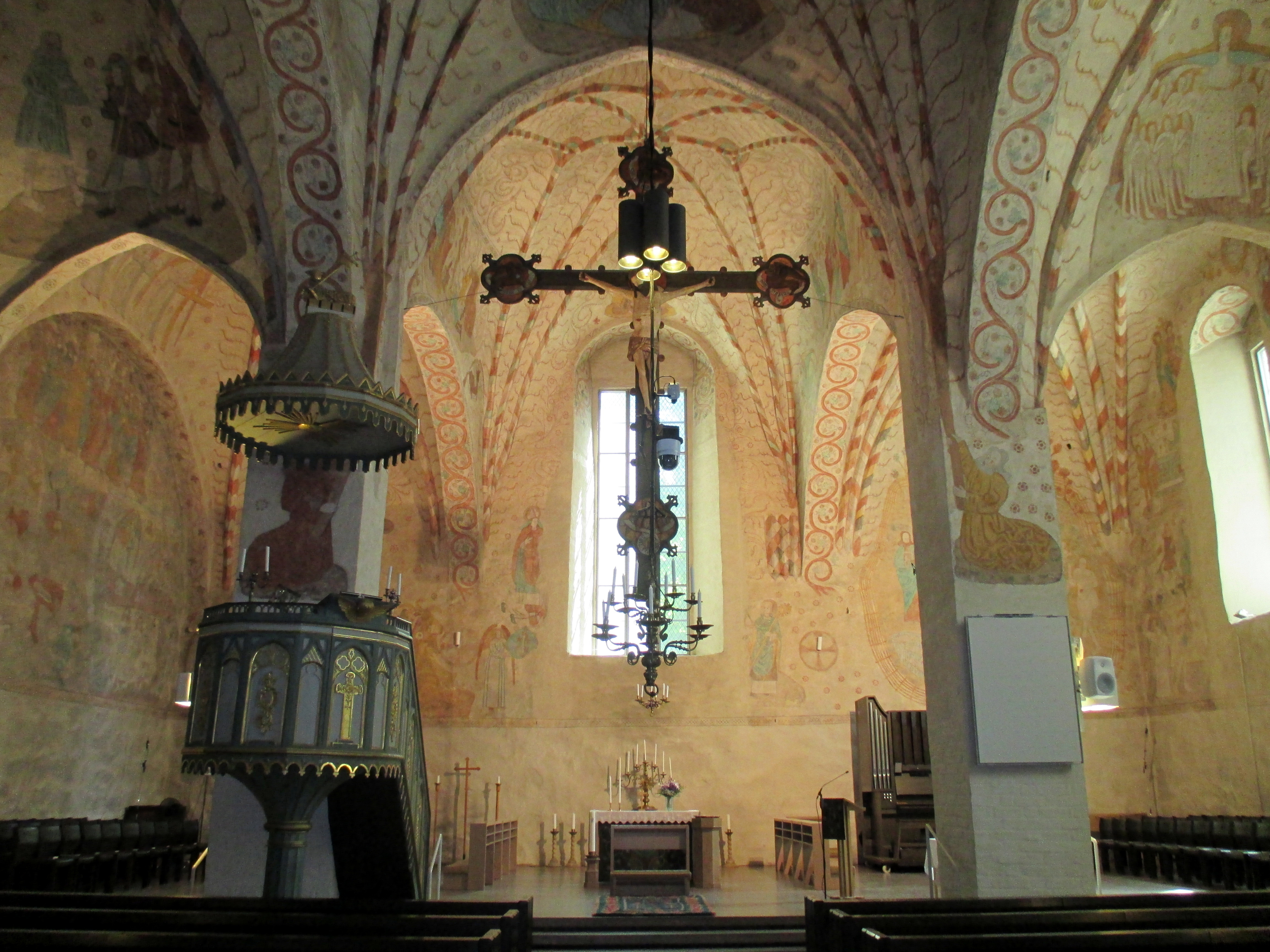
Interior view of Lohja Church showing the vivid medieval paintings executed in 1510s.

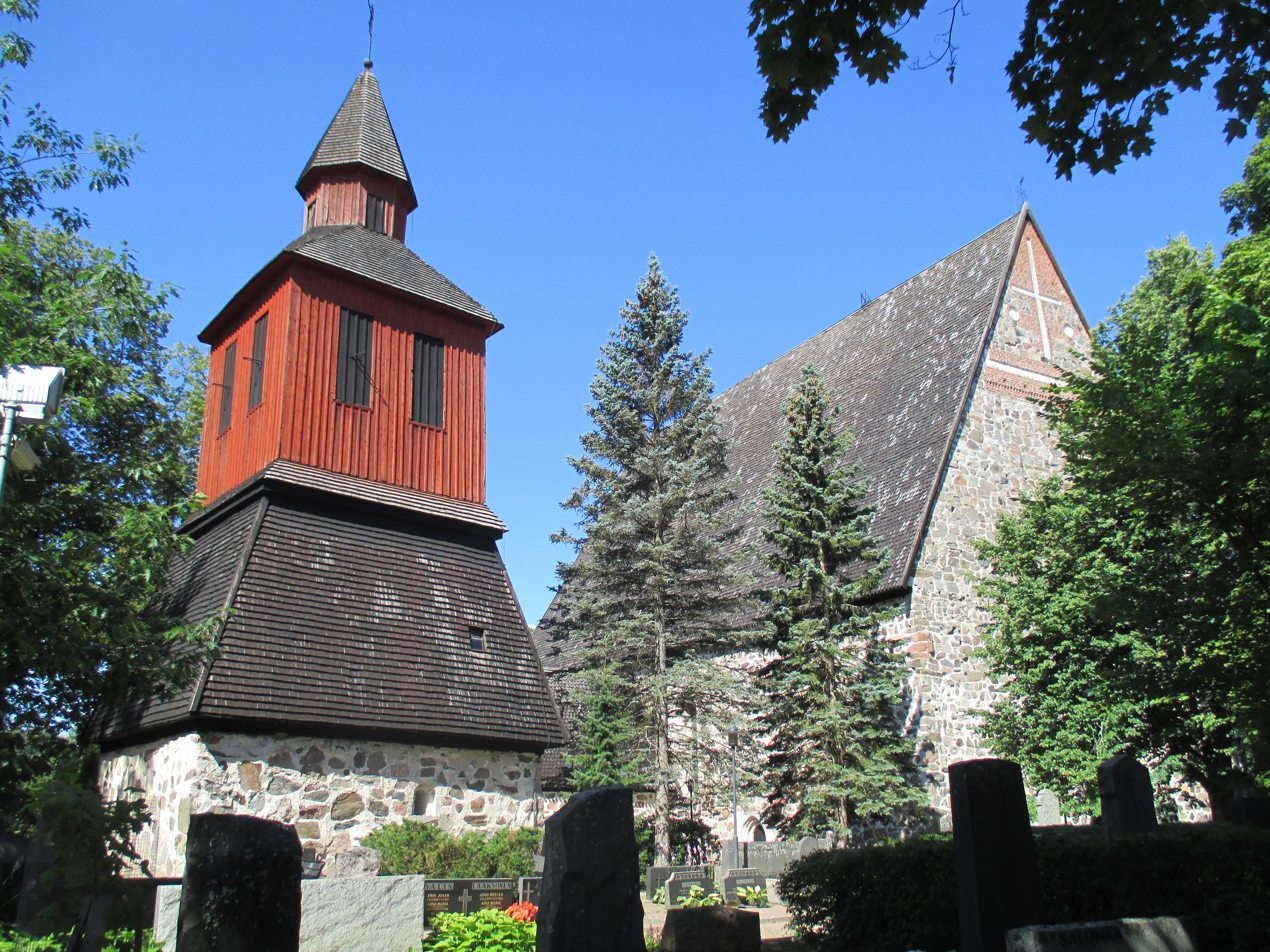
Bell tower. The masonry part dates probably to the Middle Ages and the wooden part was constructed around year 1740.

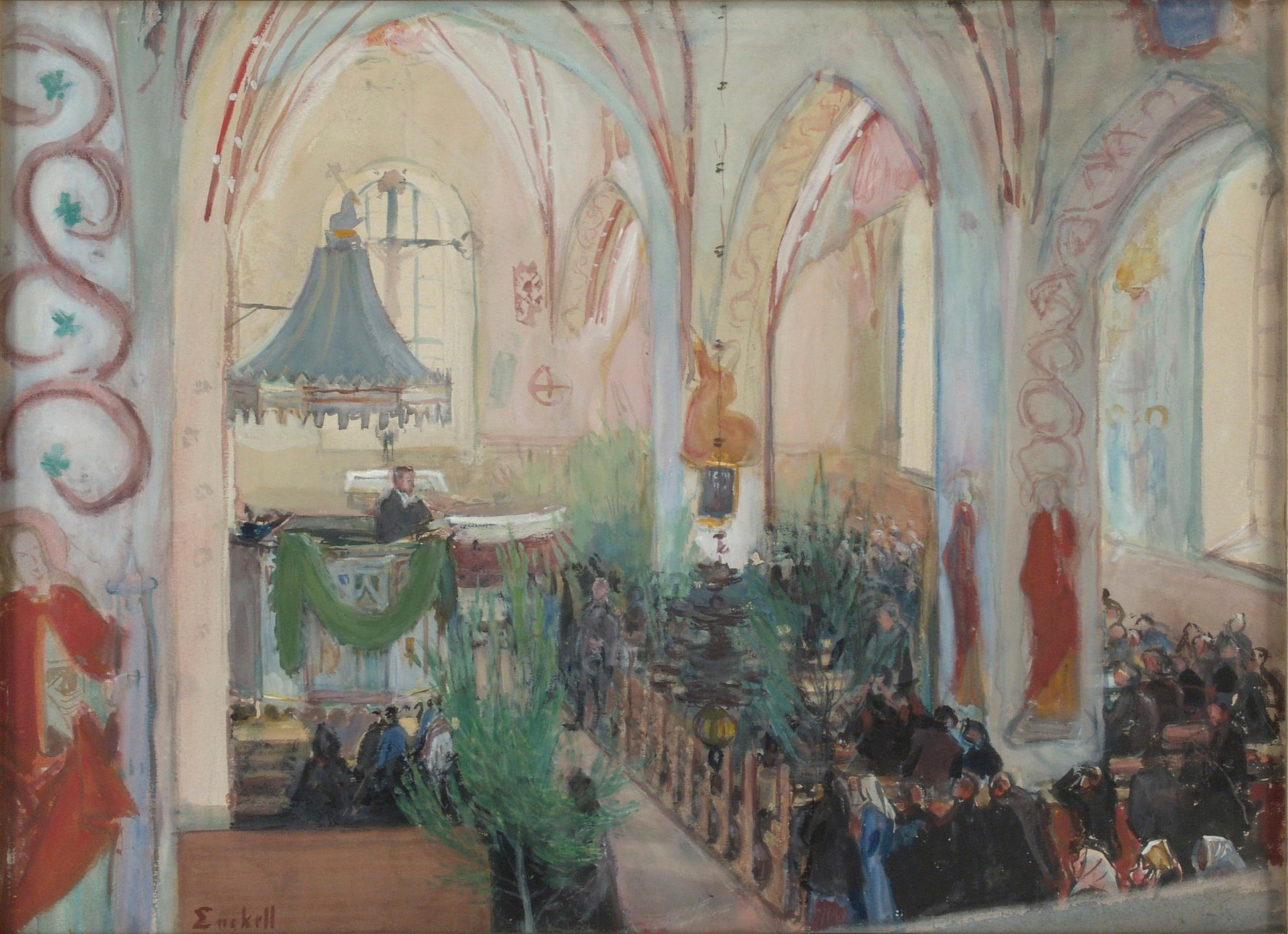
Midsummer Day Service in Lohja Church by Magnus Enckell in 1899

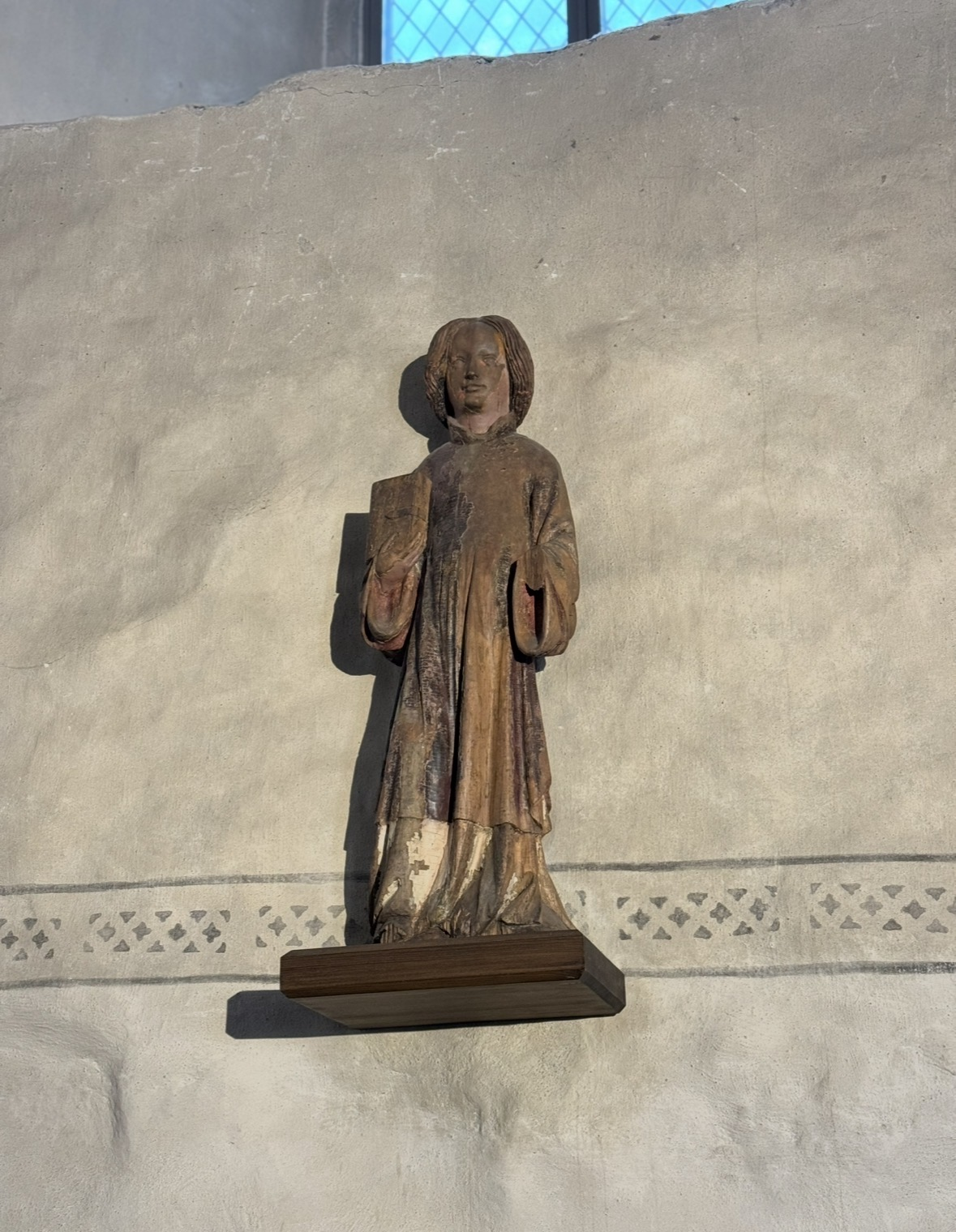
Mediaeval wooden sculpture in the church

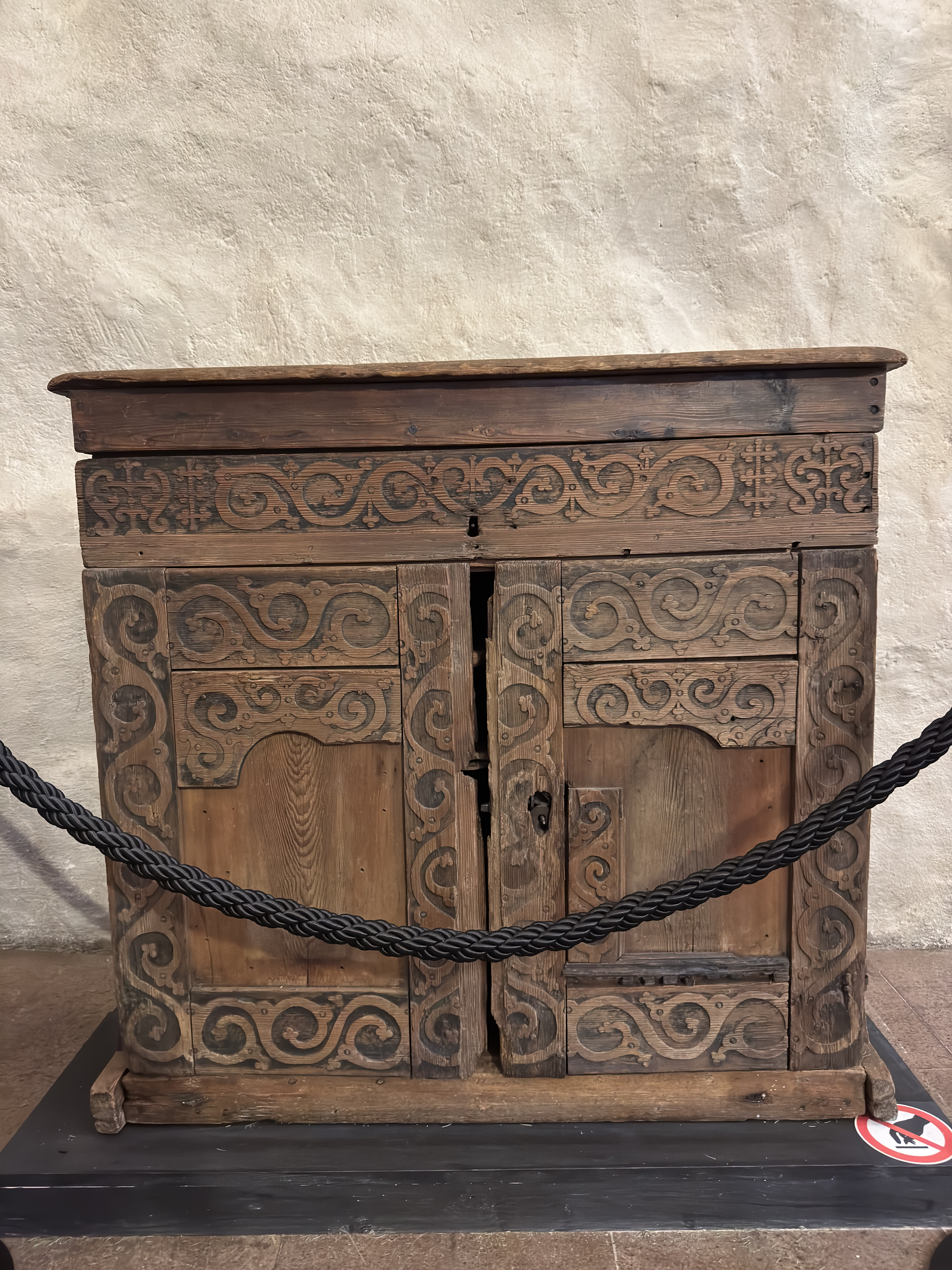
Baroque cabinet from the 17th century inside the church.

== See also ==
- St. Lawrence Church, Vantaa
