= Charles Bassi =

Italian-Finnish architect (1772–1840)

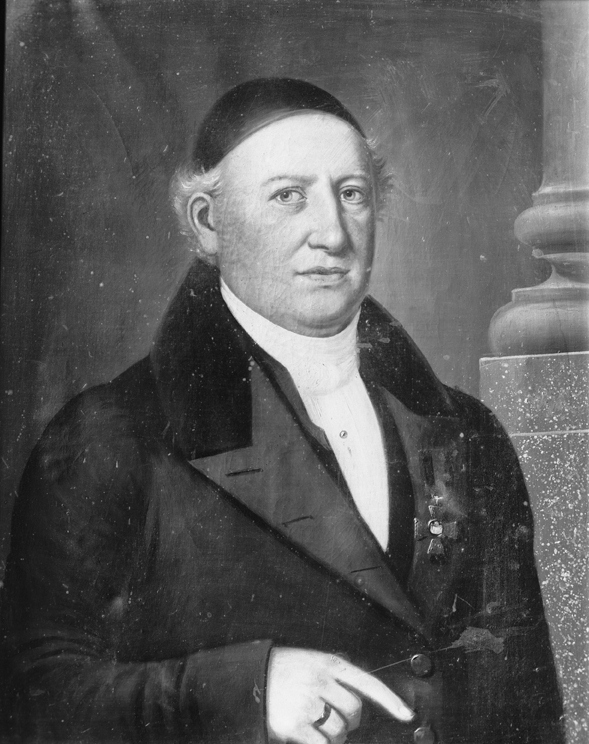
Charles Bassi

Charles (Carlo) Francesco Bassi (12 November 1772, Turin – 11 November 1840, Turku) was a Finnish architect of Italian descent. He was the first professionally trained architect who permanently work in present-day Finland. He worked, both as an independent architect and as an official responsible for planning new churches, in a Neoclassical style.

== Life ==
Charles Bassi was the brother of ballet dancer Giovanna Bassi and came with her from present-day Italy to Sweden in 1783. Initially, he was employed by the Swedish King Gustav III as a page but started studying architecture at the Royal Swedish Academy of Arts in Stockholm in 1784. His principal teacher was Louis Jean Desprez. He was awarded prizes at the academy in 1788 and 1790, and after finishing his studies, left for an eight-year-long study trip to Italy and Paris. He thereafter returned to Stockholm and began his career as an assistant to Carl Christoffer Gjörwell in his position as city architect of Stockholm. Gjörwell and Bassi had studied together at the academy and knew each other.

In 1802, Bassi travelled to Finland (at the time a part of Sweden) to supervise the construction of a new building for the Royal Academy of Turku designed by Gjörwell. The finishing of the construction of the building was delayed until 1815, and by that time Bassi had already established himself as an independent architect in Turku. He never returned to Sweden but settled permanently in Finland (which in 1809 had been lost by Sweden to Russia following the Finnish War).

At first, he was active as an independent architect, notably in Turku, and was in 1810 appointed as the head of a government agency (Swedish: intendenturkontoret) responsible for producing plans for new church buildings. He kept his position and in 1821 moved with the agency to the new capital of the Grand Duchy, Helsinki. He took his leave in 1824 and was succeeded by Carl Ludvig Engel. He moved back to Turku and continued working as an independent architect there until his death in 1840.

== Architecture ==
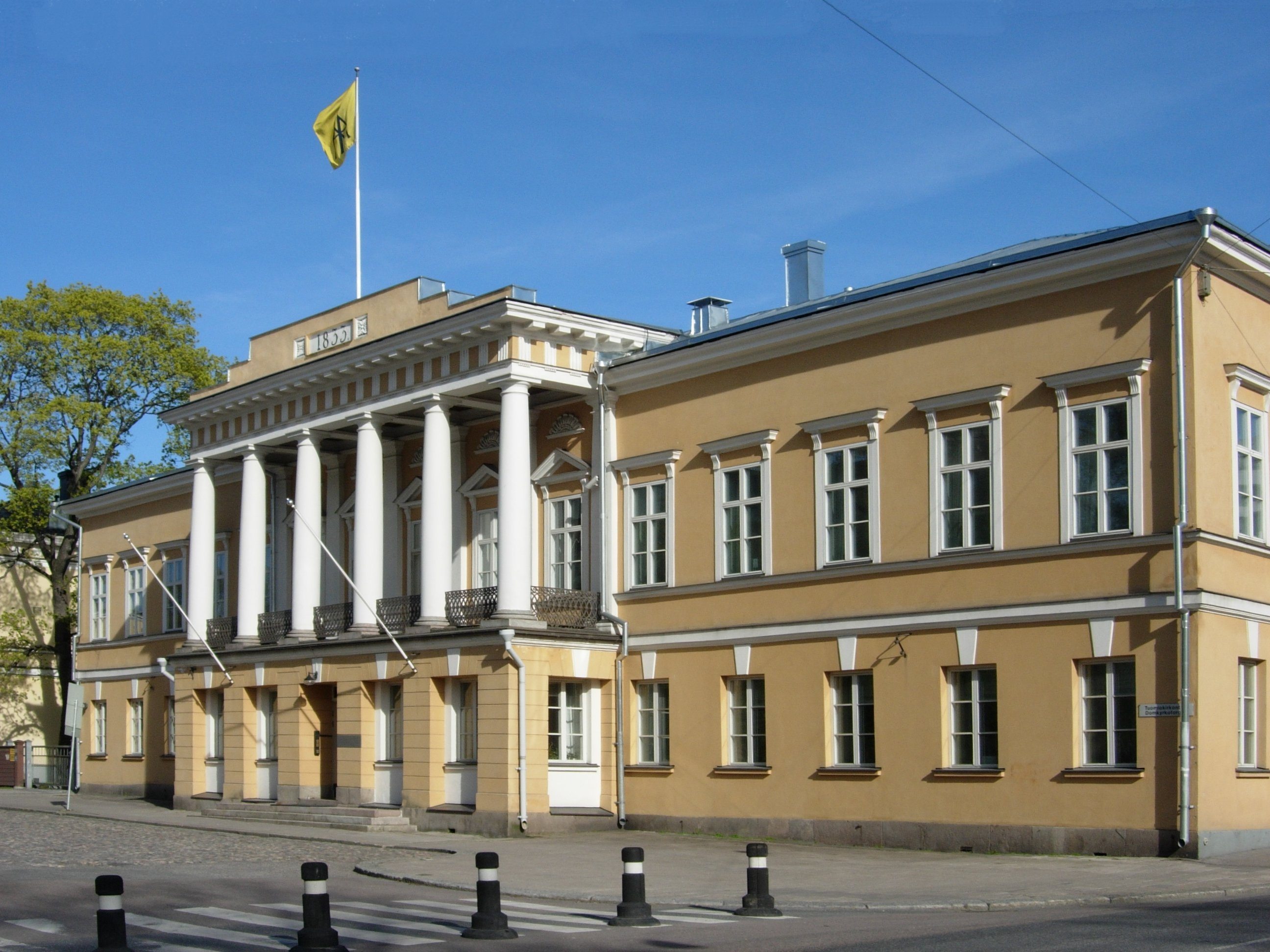
Åbo Akademi University main building in Turku (1832-33)

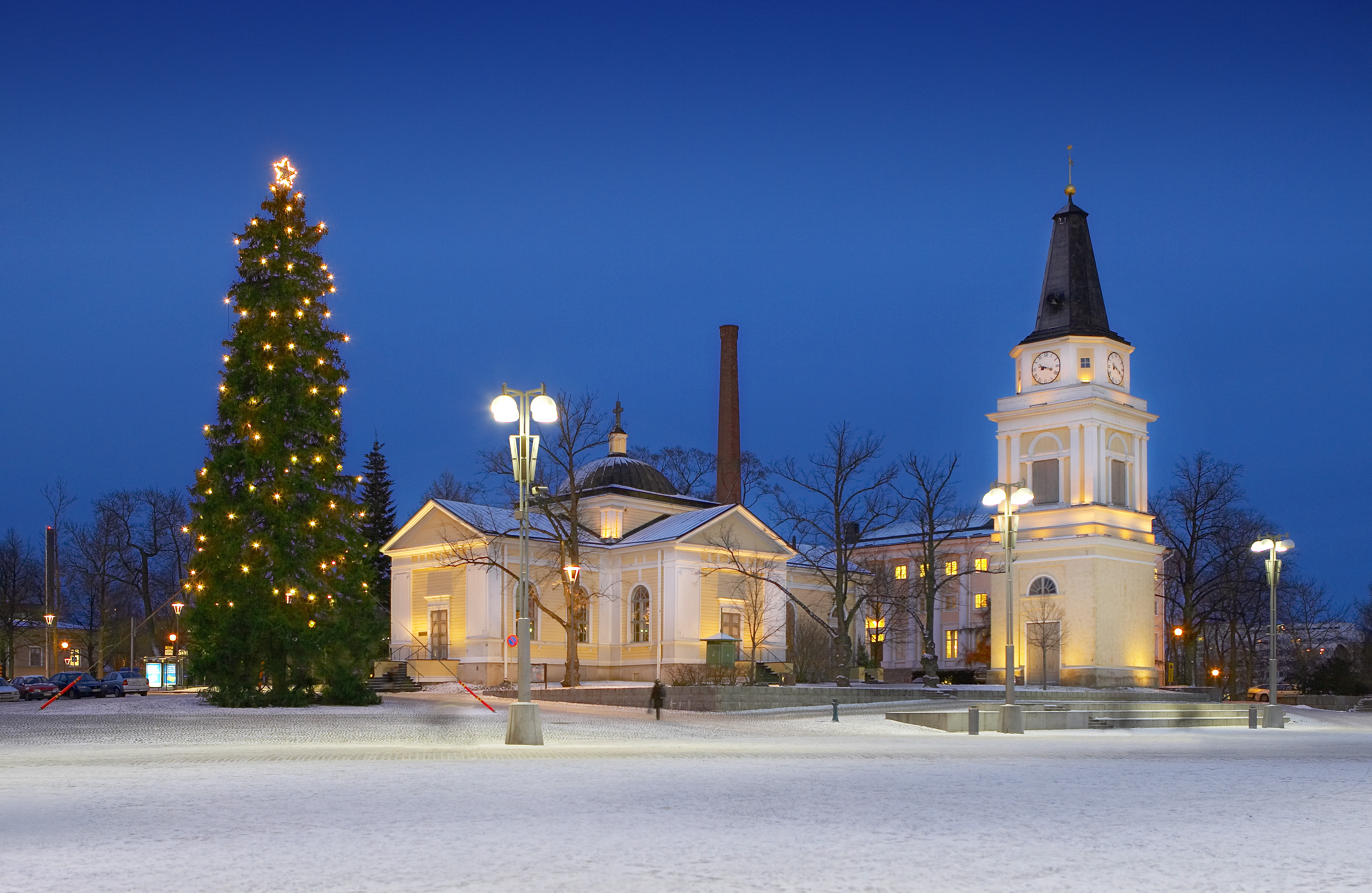
The Tampere Old Church in Tampere (1824-25)

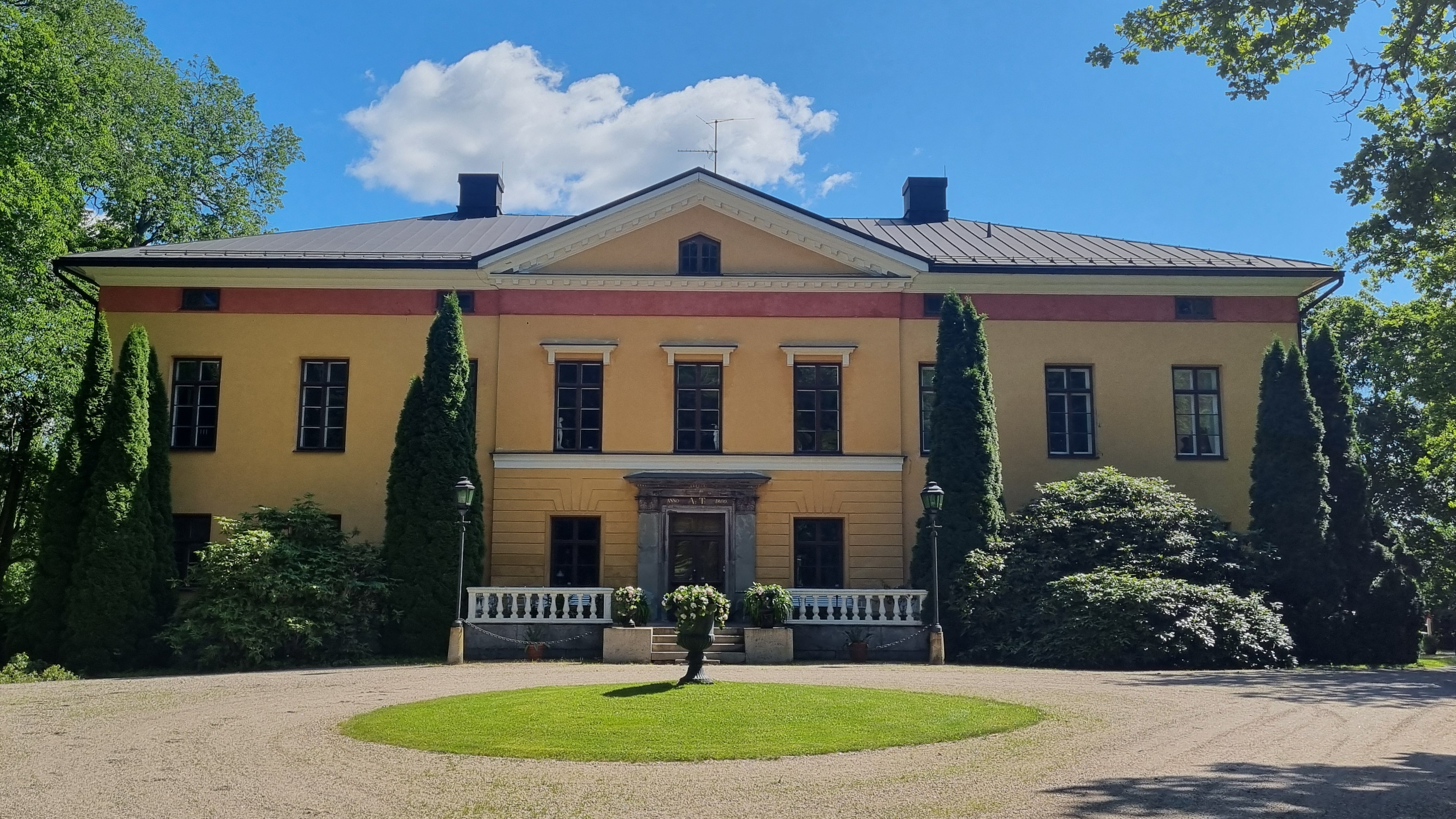
Wiurila Mansion in Salo

Bassi worked in a Neoclassical style and had a significant impact on the architecture of Finland in several ways. Notably, the city centre of Turku, with its pronounced Neoclassical architecture, contains several buildings by Bassi and was to some extent shaped by his work.

In Sweden, where he began his career, only a single building can be safely attributed to Bassi's hand: Aske Manor in Uppland. In Finland, Bassi continued to work in the restrained form of Neoclassicism which was popular in Sweden (sometimes called Gustavian after King Gustav III) and practised by his friend and co-worker Gjörwell. It stands in contrast to the more elaborate Neoclassicism that was later to become popular in Finland through the influence from Saint Petersburg, practised e.g. by his successor Carl Ludvig Engel. Wiurila Mansion has been described as the best example of Bassi's architecture from the 1810s. At Joensuu Manor, he designed a granary which is the first secular Neo-Gothic building in Finland (1813). The churches designed by Bassi usually followed local tradition in their design, as this was often requested by the parishes. Most of them are restrained, cross-shaped churches. Among the later works of Bassi, the main building of Åbo Akademi University in Turku has been proposed as the most accomplished. It displays possible influences from the architecture of Carl Ludvig Engel in the centrally placed colonnade on the facade.

Architects of a younger generation influenced by him include Pehr Johan Gylich and Charles Johnsson.
