= Aske Manor =

Manor house in Stockholm county, Sweden

Coordinates: 59°36′28″N 17°38′40″E

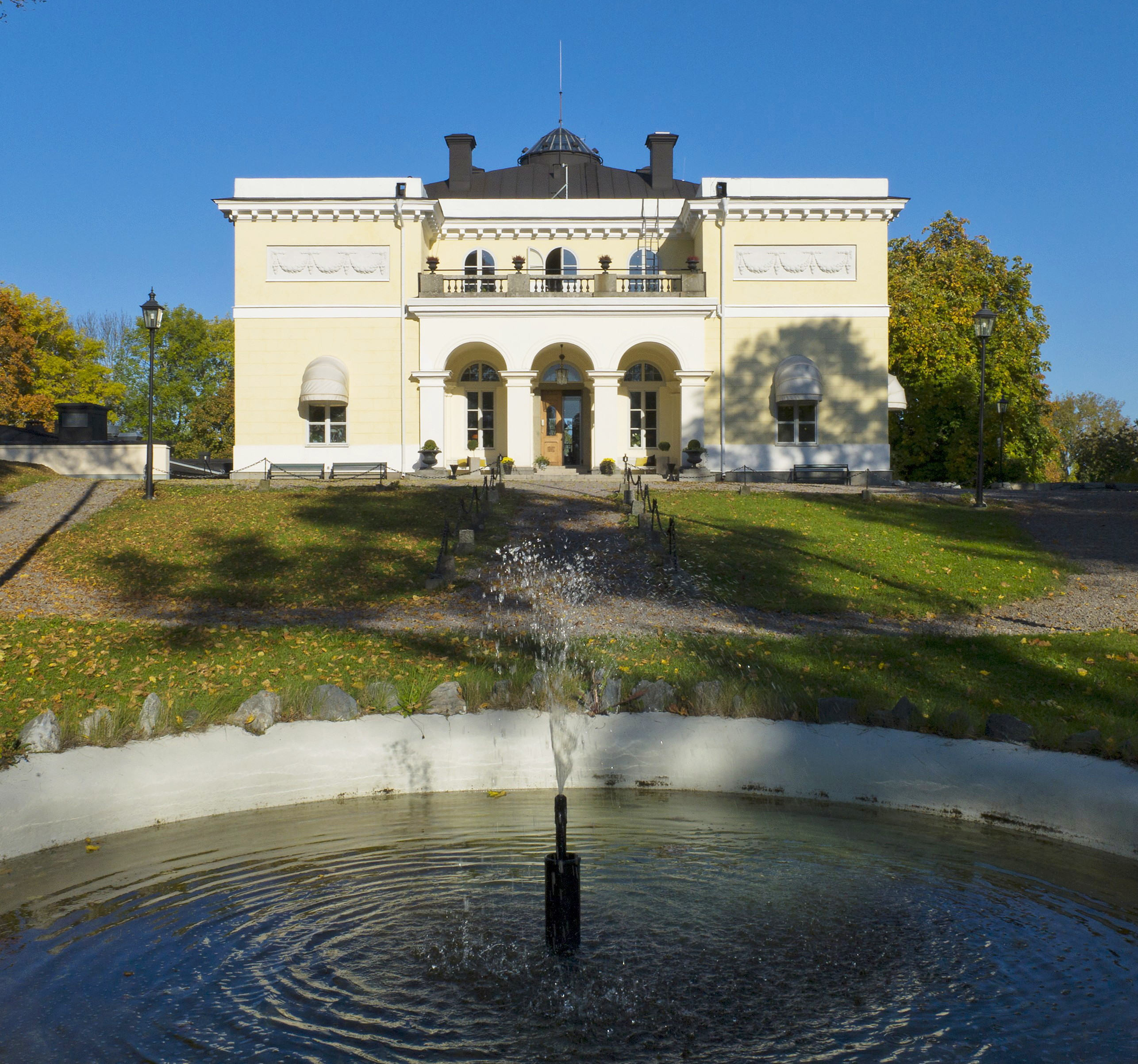
Aske Manor

Aske Manor (Aske herrgård) is a manor house located in Upplands-Bro Municipality, Stockholm County, Sweden.

== History ==
The history of the estate goes back to at least the 14th century, when it is mentioned in written sources for the first time. During the 17th century it belonged to the De la Gardie family, including Privy Councilor Jacob De la Gardie (1583–1652).

During the 18th century it belonged to families Olivecrantz, Wallrawe, Drufva, Leijonstedt, Ingelotz and Fleetwood. In 1799 it was sold to C. G. Sehmann, who built the present main building in Neoclassical architectural style to designs by Italian born, Finnish architect Charles Bassi (1772–1840).

Today it houses a conference venue, Villa Aske.
