= Church of St. Lawrence, Vantaa =

The Church of St. Lawrence
- Vantaan Pyhän Laurin kirkko (in Finnish); Helsinge kyrka S:t Lars (in Swedish)
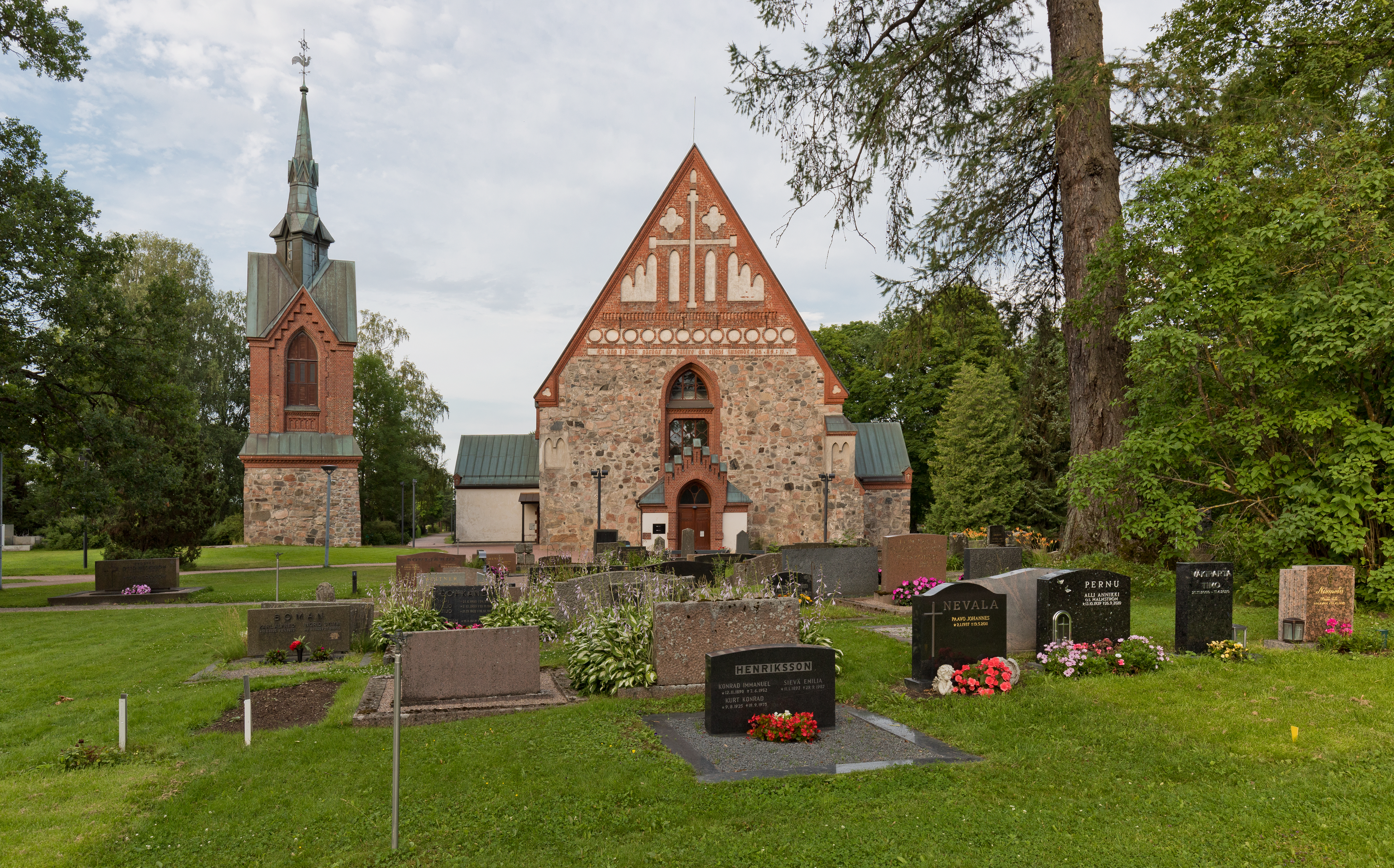
- The Church of St. Lawrence and its bell tower
- The Church of St. Lawrence
- 60°16′59.28″N 24°59′9.49″E
- Location: Kirkkotie 45, Helsinki Parish Village, 01510 Vantaa
- Country: Finland
- Denomination: Evangelical Lutheran Church of Finland
- Previous denomination: Catholic
- Website: www.vantaanseurakunnat.fi/en/saintlawrence

History
- Status: Parish church
- Founded: ca. 1450
- Dedication: Lawrence of Rome

Architecture
- Functional status: Active
- Architect: Carl Theodor Höijer
- Architectural type: Church
- Style: Medieval, Gothic Revival

Specifications
- Capacity: about 500
- Length: 27.6 metres (91 ft)
- Width: 17.4 metres (57 ft)

Administration
- Parish: Tikkurila

The Church of St. Lawrence (Finnish: Vantaan Pyhän Laurin kirkko; Swedish: Helsinge kyrka S:t Lars) is a church in Vantaa, Finland. Dating back to ca. 1450, it is the oldest building in Vantaa and all of Greater Helsinki. It is also the main church of the Tikkurila Parish. Along with its surrounding neighborhood, the church is a part of the Helsingin pitäjän kirkonkylä district, which is one of the best preserved historical parishes in all of Finland.

The Church of St. Lawrence was partially destroyed in a fire on 7 May 1893, after which it was reconstructed in a Gothic Revival style.

== History ==
The Church of St. Lawrence was built around the year 1450, though records suggest that a wooden equivalent stood in its position as early as 1401. Prior to the Protestant Reformation and the introduction of Lutheranism into Finland, the church served the Roman Catholic Church. It was built as the church of Helsinki Parish, well before Helsinki, the city, was founded in 1550. The parish village with its church was favorably located on a coastal road between Turku and Vyborg. A branch of the salmon-rich River Vantaa ran through the village as well.

=== Burning of 1893 ===
On 7 May 1893, the church was largely destroyed by a conflagration, leaving behind only its stone walls and vaults. Reconstruction was overseen by the renowned Finnish architect Theodor Höijer, who opted to alter the appearance of the church by increasing the sizes of its windows and tending toward a Gothic Revival style. The reconstruction, or as it was referred to, the restoration, was influenced by the cultural context of the late 1800s, during which Medieval architecture was gaining newfound respect in Finland.

The church was reopened in 1894, marking the then-believed 400 year anniversary of the building. More recently, the church has been recognized as older, by at least 50 years.

== Exterior ==
The façade of the church is reminiscent of other Finnish medieval churches, such as the Porvoo Cathedral. The reason for the similarity is that many churches from that time period in southern Finland were designed by the same person, the anonymous Pernajan mestari, who is presumed to be a German architect. The church has, however, been redesigned to some extent following the fire of 1893, leading to the current design being a mixture of Medieval and Gothic Revival architecture.

The façade features a biblical excerpt (from Psalms 84:10) in Swedish: "En dag i dina gårdar är bättre än eljest de tusende" (English: "For a day in thy courts is better than a thousand elsewhere").

The roof of the church, prior to the fire, was a tarred shake wood shingle roof. After the reconstruction, it was made into a copper roof.

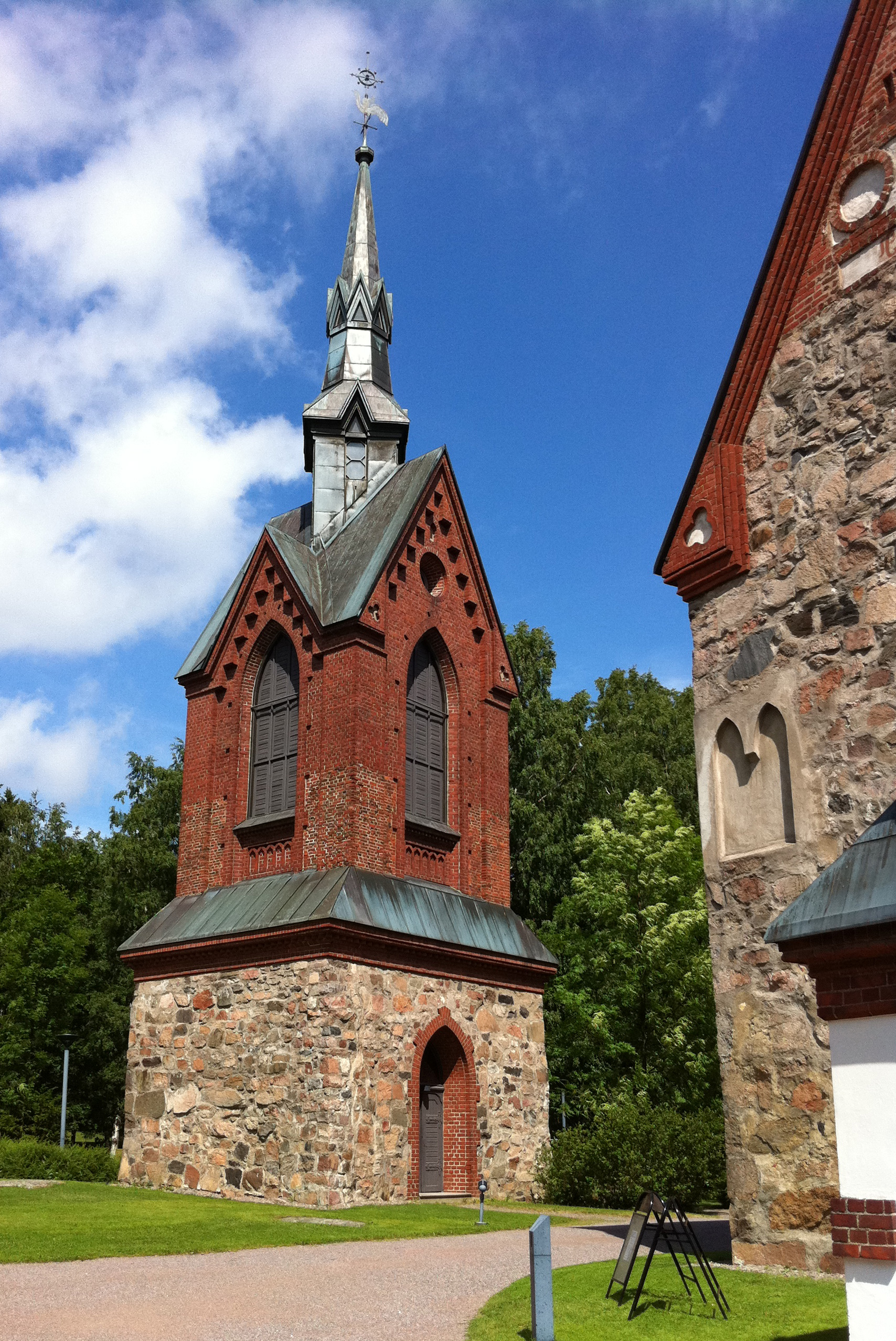
The bell tower.

=== Bell tower ===
The Church of St. Lawrence has an external bell tower located next to the front of the building. It was completely destroyed in 1893 and rebuilt in a style similar to the Gothic Revival style of the church building. The tower has two bells, and its roof is peaked by a flèche with a cockerel weather vane.

=== Graveyard ===
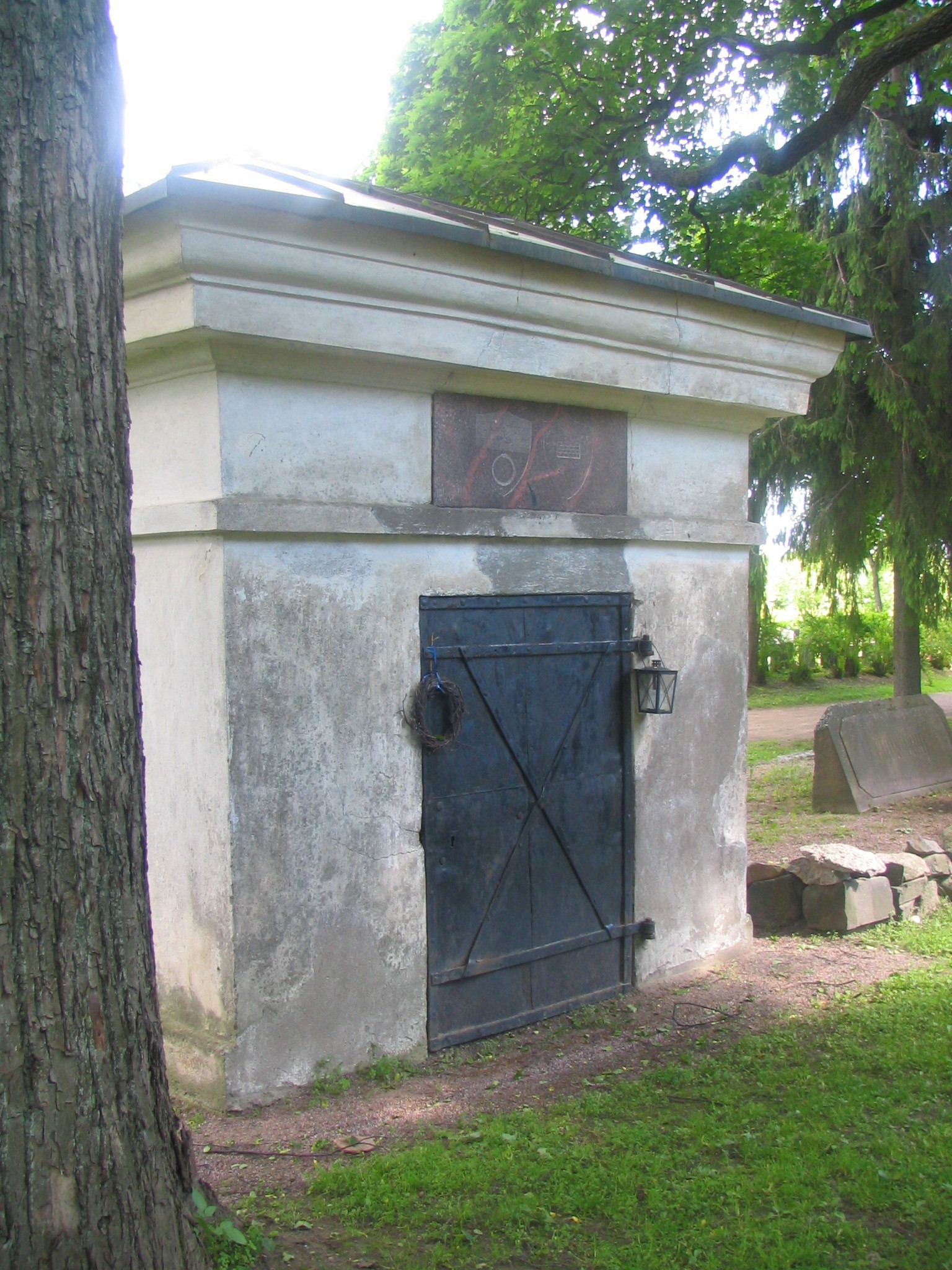
The mausoleum of Carl Olof Cronstedt.

The church is surrounded by a graveyard, which acts as the primary graveyard for the parishes of Vantaa. Up until 1793, the graveyard remained constrained to its original size, until an inspection deemed it too crowded. Since then, it has been regularly expanded to suit the needs of the growing population. The graveyard's current area is about 10 hectares (25 acres). Its most notable grave is the mausoleum of Swedish naval commander Carl Olof Cronstedt. Eddie Boyd, an American blues pianist, singer and songwriter, best known for his recordings in the early 1950s, is also buried in the graveyard.

== Interior ==
Prior to the fire of 1893, the church interior remained largely unchanged throughout the centuries. One change that took place was the treating of the inner walls with chalk; in the Middle Ages, the walls were decorated with Medieval paintings, but by the 18th century, the walls were chalked white. The fire revealed several pre-Reformation paintings on the church vaults, though contemporaries deemed the paintings artistically worthless and "primitive". Before being painted over again, the art historian Emil Nervander made replica paintings of them, which are currently stored by the Finnish National Board of Antiquities.

The main stained glass window of the church was completed after the 1893 fire. It depicts Jesus comforting a pilgrim.

In 1853, the church received its first pipe organ. Though destroyed in 1893, the replacement organ replicated the visual appearance of the original. It was adapted for electrical power in the 1930s. The current organ was built in 1976, though it adapts the front of the 1800s design for visual similarity.

== Gallery ==
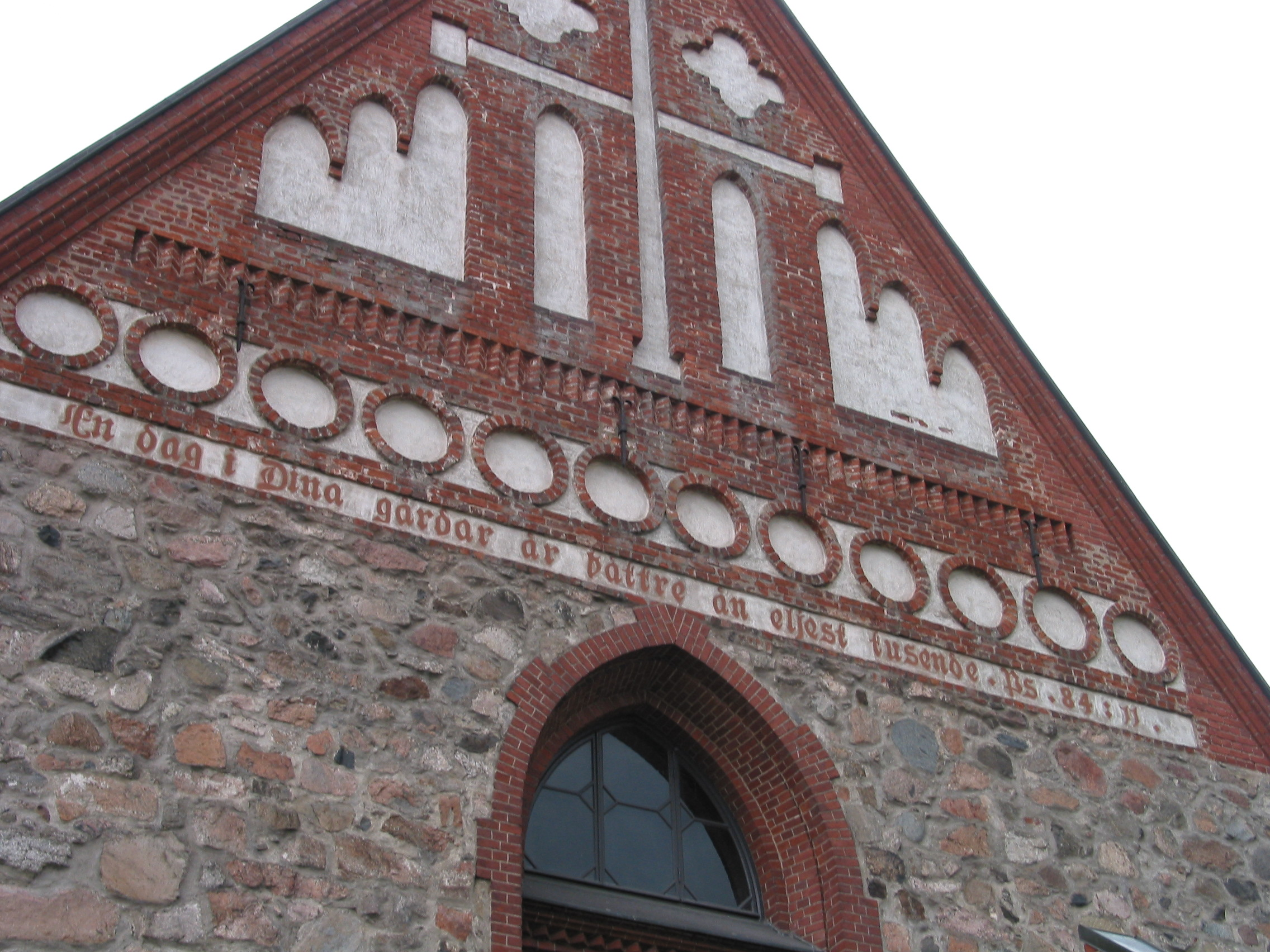
Gable with a Swedish text from Psalms 84:10: "For a day in thy courts is better than a thousand elsewhere."

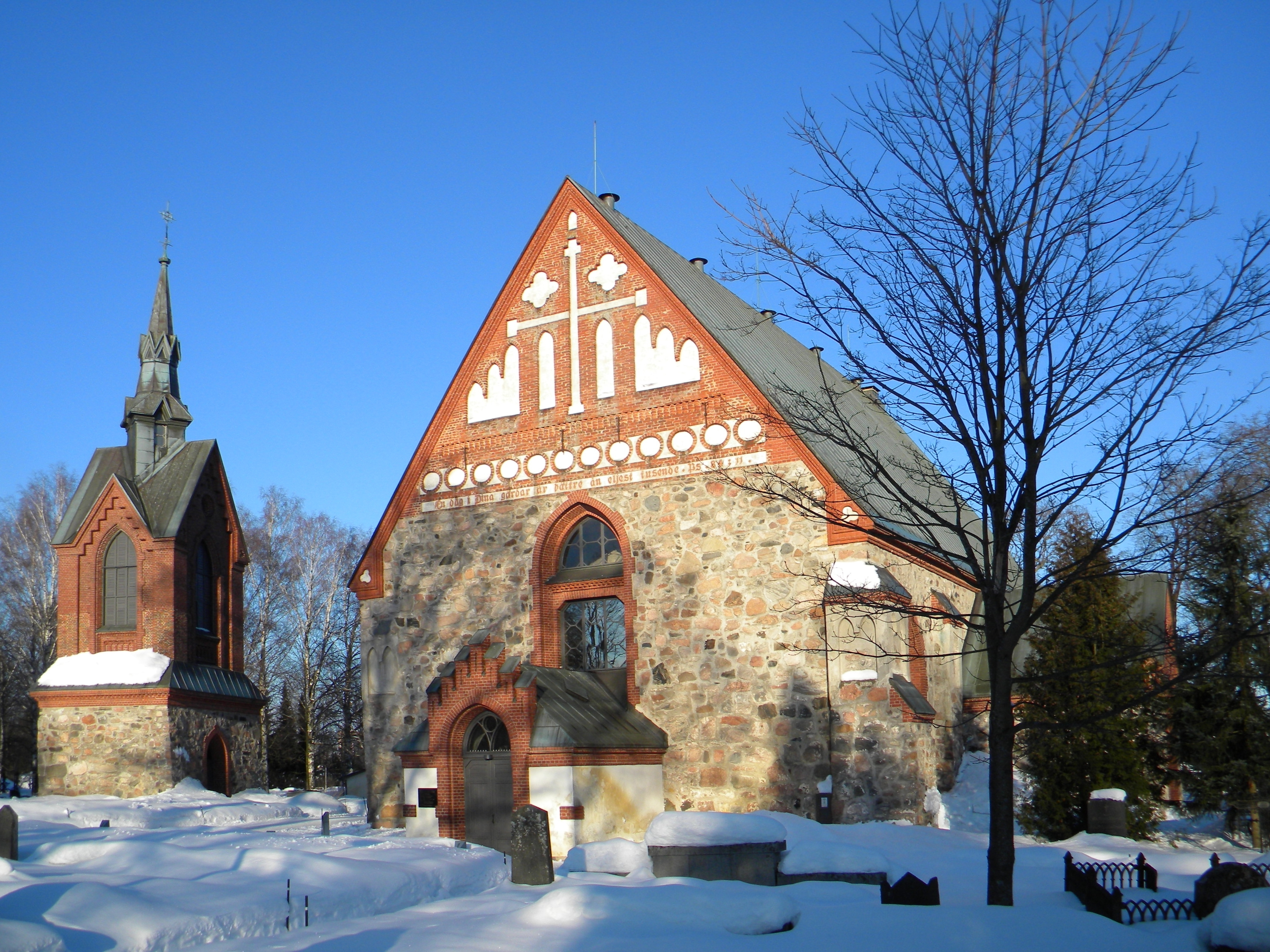
The church in winter

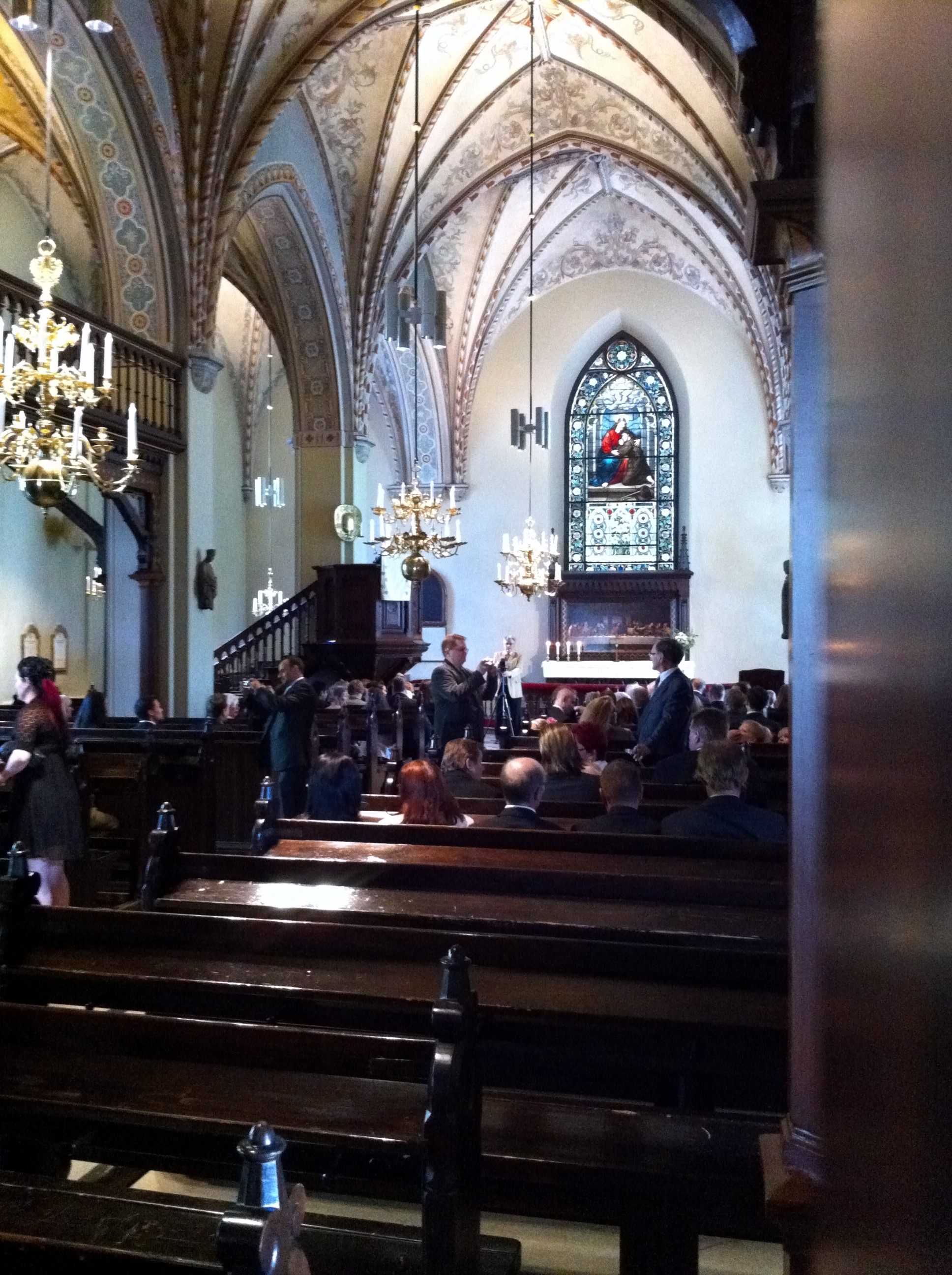
The interior of the church

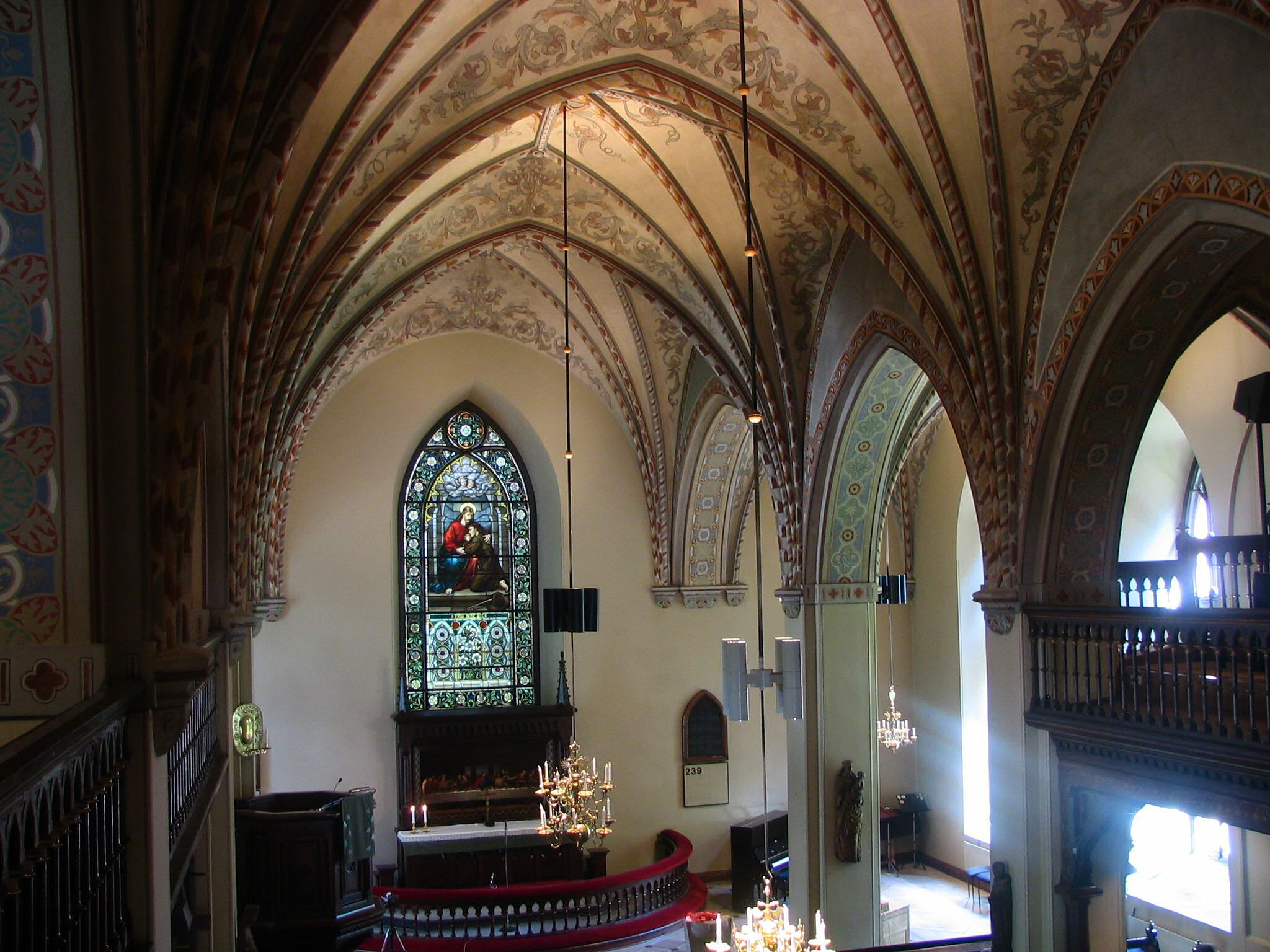
The vaults of the church

== See also ==
- St. Lawrence Church, Lohja
