= Helsingin pitäjän kirkonkylä =

Helsingin pitäjän kirkonkylä Helsinge kyrkoby
- City District
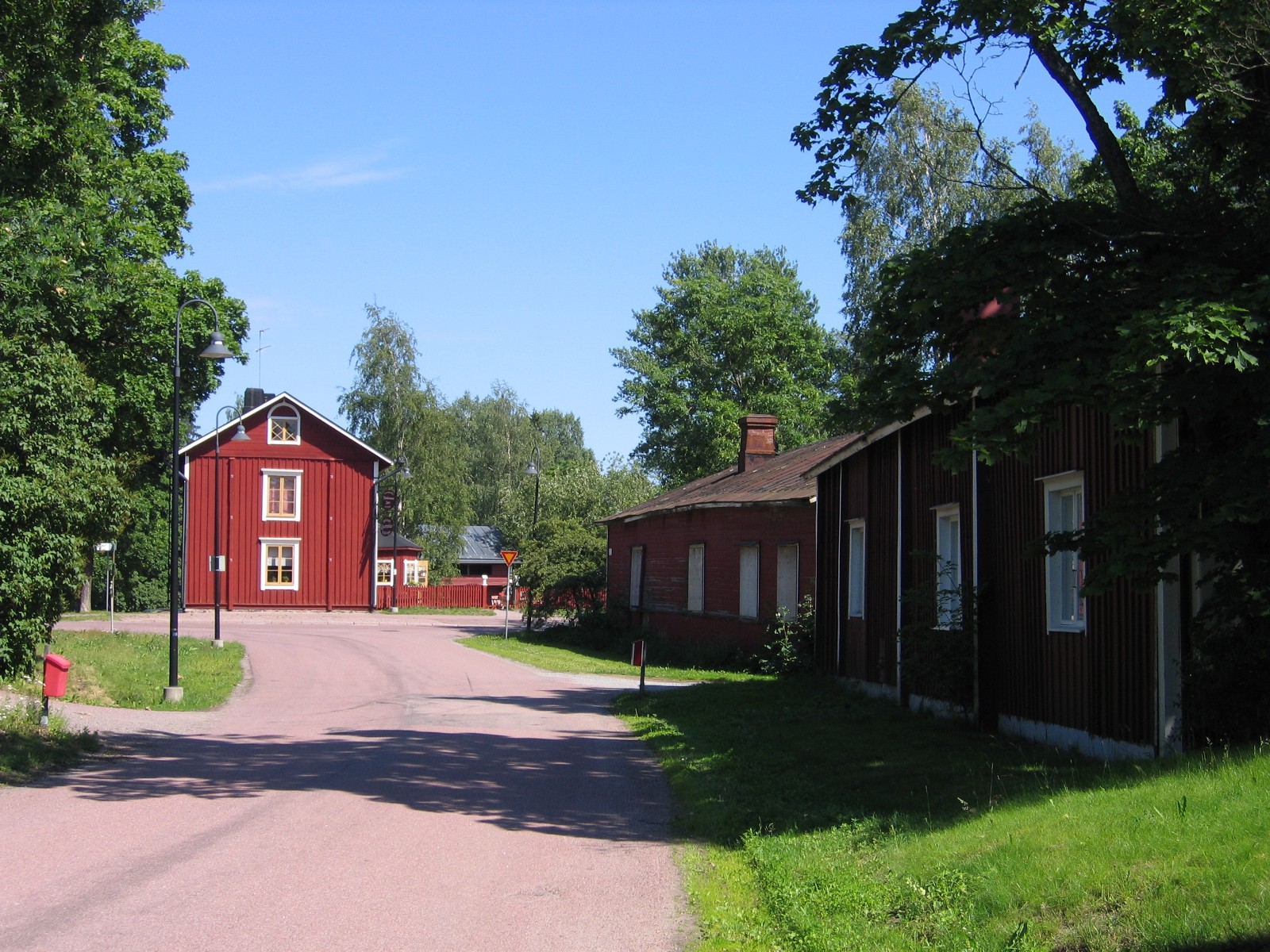
- A street in Helsingin pitäjän kirkonkylä

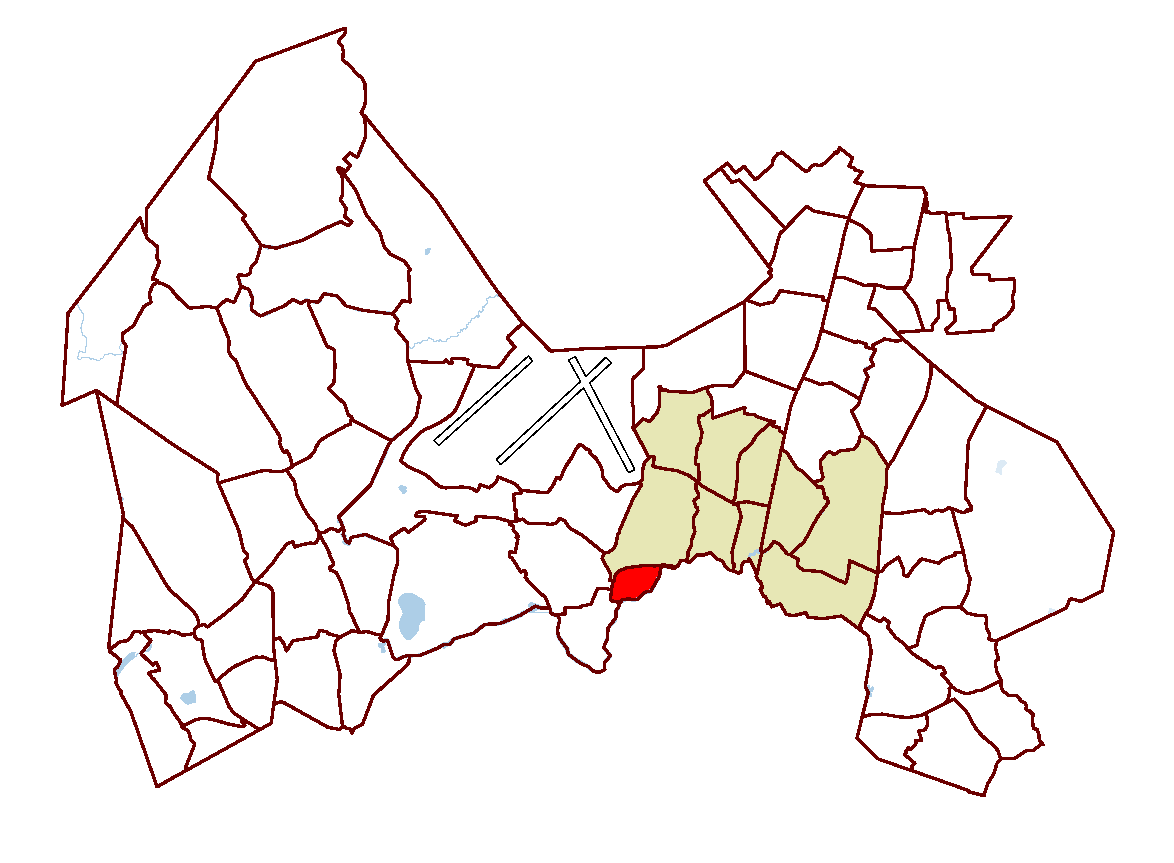
- Location on the map of Vantaa, with the district in red and the Tikkurila major region in light brown
- Coordinates: 60°16′59″N 24°59′09″E
- Country: Finland
- City: Vantaa
- Major region: Tikkurila

Area
  - Total: 0.7 km^{2} (0.27 sq mi)

Population (1.1.2014)
  - Total: 147
  - Density: 210/km^{2} (540/sq mi)
- Time zone: GMT +2
- Postal Code(s): 01510
- Website: www.vantaa.fi/frontpage/

Helsingin pitäjän kirkonkylä (Swedish: Helsinge kyrkoby; lit. Helsinki Parish Village) is a city district in Vantaa, Finland. It is located in central Vantaa, in the Tikkurila major region. It is bordered to the north by the Ring III beltway, the west by the Tuusulanväylä highway, and south and east by the Helsinki neighbourhood of Siltamäki. The Helsinki–Vantaa Airport is located 7 kilometres (4.3 mi) northwest of the district.

The district is regarded as an important cultural and historic site, as it remains one of the best preserved parishes in southern Finland and the original settlement within Greater Helsinki. The Church of St. Lawrence, the oldest building in Greater Helsinki, is located there. In 2009, the Finnish National Board of Antiquities declared the parish an official culturally significant site.

In terms of land area, the district is the smallest in all of Vantaa, covering a total of 0.7 square kilometres (0.27 sq mi). Its population is also among the smallest, with 147 inhabitants in January 2014. Roughly a third of the population is Swedish-speaking, and all schools in the district are taught in Swedish.

== History ==
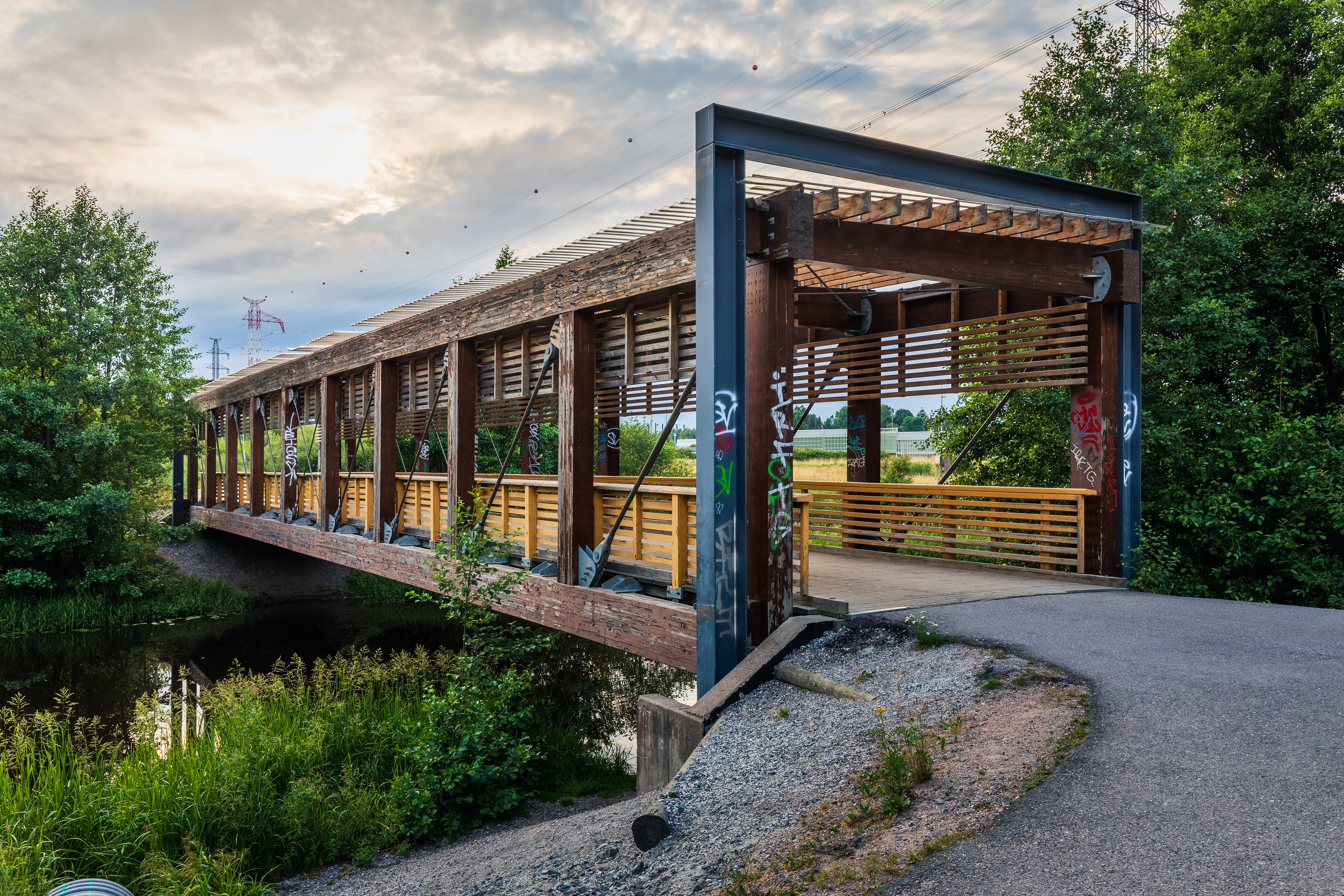
Sateenkaarisilta (literally the "rainbow bridge"), a wooden covered bridge for pedestrians and cyclists, over the Kerava River, between Helsinki and Vantaa.

The area was first settled around the 12th century by Swedish settlers sailing up the Vantaanjoki river. The parish was established at the meeting point of the Vantaanjoki and Keravanjoki rivers. It expanded as the coastal King's Road connecting Turku and Vyborg connected to the town. The Church of St. Lawrence was established in the mid-15th century as the center of the parish, and remains the oldest building in all of Greater Helsinki. The parish was the largest township in the area, until the port city of Helsinki was established along the coast in 1550.

In 1865, when the Grand Duchy of Finland established municipalities, the area became known as Helsinge socken and Helsingin maalaiskunta ("Rural Municipality of Helsinki"), which later became the city of Vantaa. The mining of ore deposits around Malmi gradually transferred industry and housing toward central Vantaa, leaving Helsingin pitäjän kirkonkylä a sparsely populated historical site.

Today, Helsingin pitäjän kirkonkylä remains one of the best preserved townships in Uusimaa. Its area has been narrowed by the construction of both the Ring III and Tuusulanväylä highways, which intersect in the area. In 2009, the Finnish National Board of Antiquities declared the parish an official culturally significant site.

== See also ==
- Church of St. Lawrence, Vantaa
- History of Helsinki
