= Tampere Old Church =

Church in Tampere, Finland

Tampere Old Church Tampereen Vanha Kirkko Tammerfors gamla kyrka
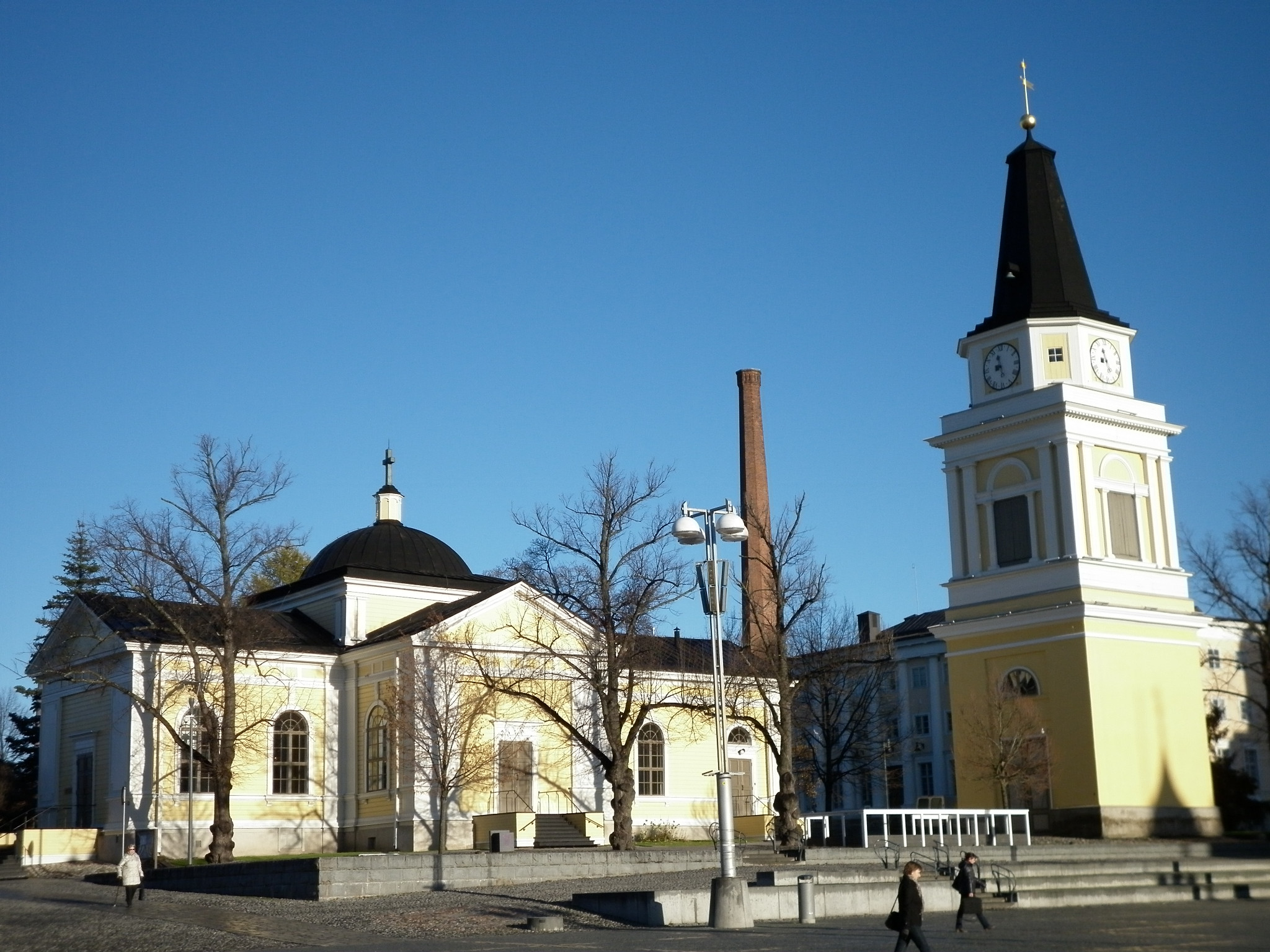

Religion
- Affiliation: Evangelical Lutheran Church of Finland
- Ecclesiastical or organizational status: Church (building)

Location
- Location: Tampere, Finland
- Interactive map of Tampere Old Church; Tampereen Vanha Kirkko; Tammerfors gamla kyrka
- Coordinates: 61°29′55″N 023°45′40″E

Architecture
- Architect: Charles Bassi
- Completed: 1824; 1825 (opened)
- Materials: Wood

The Tampere Old Church (Finnish: Tampereen Vanha Kirkko; Swedish: Tammerfors gamla kyrka) is a wooden cross church opened in 1825 in Tampere, Finland near the Central Square. The old church is mainly used by the Swedish-speaking Lutheran congregation in Tampere. The church was designed by Italian-born Carlo Bassi and completed in 1824. The belfry, designed by C. L. Engel, was completed in 1828. The Old Church is the oldest surviving building in the city center of Tampere, and the adjoining belfry is the second oldest.

The church has been renovated several times, most recently in 2000. The most significant restoration took place between 1953 and 1954, when the church was restored to almost its original appearance according to a restoration plan drawn up by Professor Nils Erik Wickberg. The church is used by the Swedish Congregation of Tampere.

== See also ==
- Helsinki Old Church
