= Matti Haahti =

Finnish footballer (born 1936)

Personal information
- Date of birth: 8 June 1936 (age 90)
- Place of birth: Tampere, Finland
- Position: Defender

International career
Years	Team	Apps	(Gls)
1957–1962	Finland	22	(0)

Matti Haahti (born 8 June 1936) is a Finnish former footballer who played as a defender. He made 22 appearances for the Finland national team from 1957 to 1962.
