= Kaakinmaa =

City district in Tampere, Finland

Coordinates: 61°29′36″N 23°45′00″E

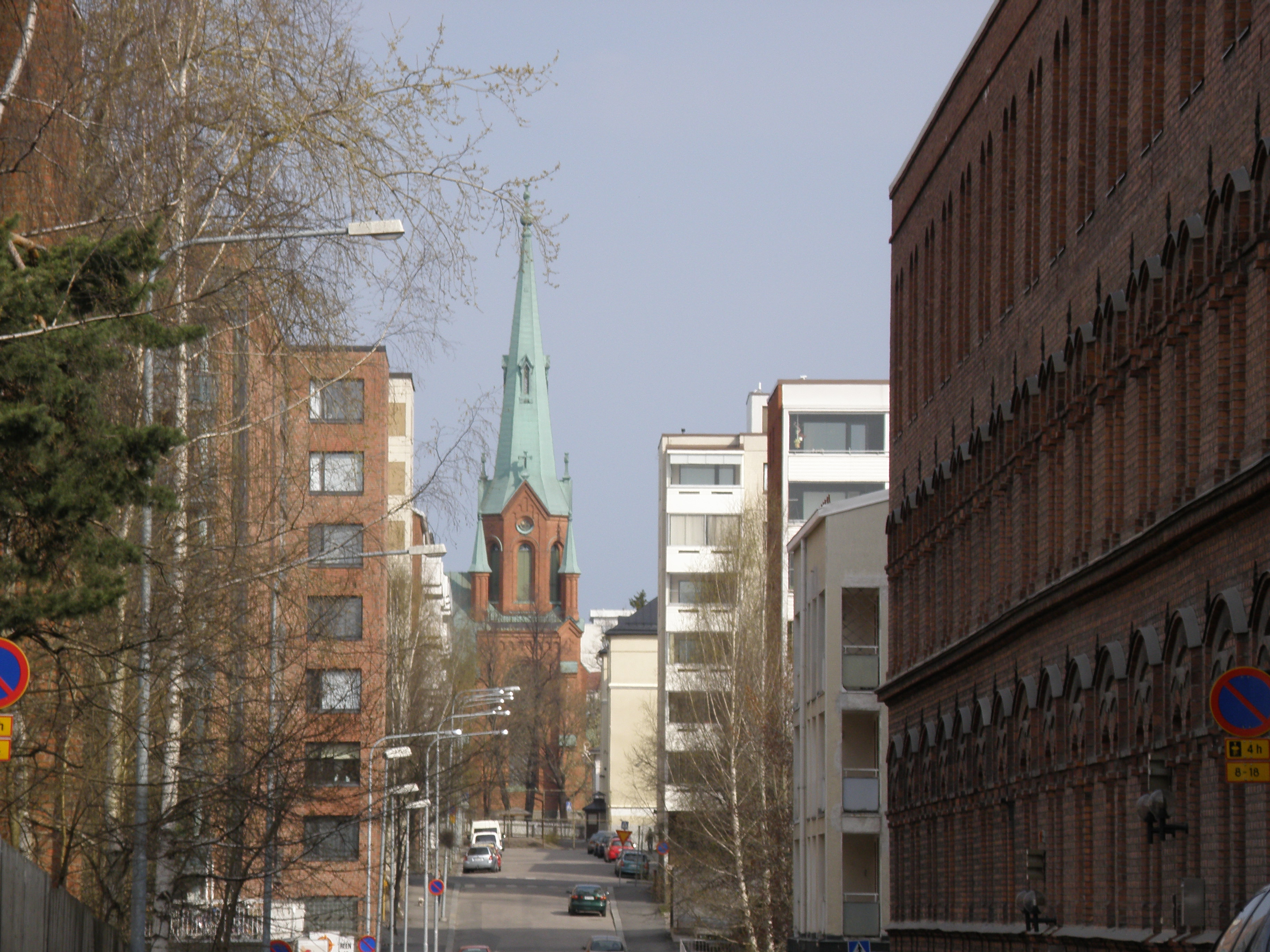
Kaakinmaa at the southern end of the Papinkatu street; in the background the Alexander Church

Kaakinmaa is a district in Tampere, Finland, located in the city center. It includes the area south of Pyynikki Church Park (Pyynikin kirkkopuisto) between the Hämeenpuisto park and the Mariankatu street. To the south, the area extends to Eteläpuisto on the shores of Lake Pyhäjärvi. The neighboring parts of the city are Nalkala in the east, Amuri in the north and Pyynikki and Pyynikinrinne in the west. Sometimes Kaakinmaa is incorrectly considered to belong to Pyynikki and Pyynikinrinne; however, Kaakinmaa has its own district.

The most important street running through the area is Satamakatu, which rises west of the slope of Pyynikinharju from Laukontori, which together with Mariankatu and Hämeenpuisto form a busy traffic route from Pyynikintori to Ratina. Along the Koulukatu street there is the Koulukatu Field, where the hockey field and ice rink are frozen in winter.

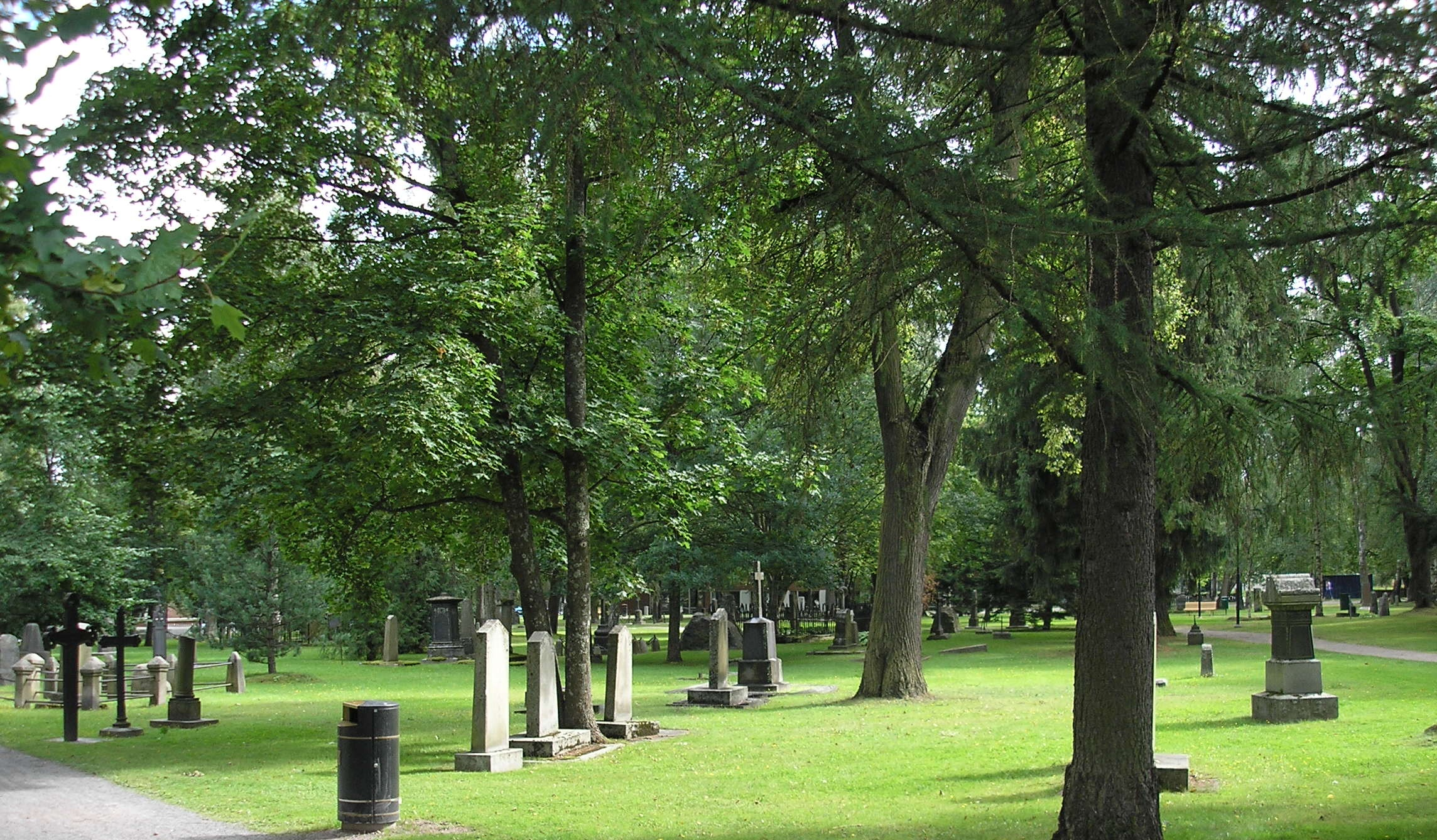
The Pyynikki Church Park, also known as the first cemetery of Tampere

In Kaakinmaa, the Tampere Workers' Hall and the Tampere Workers' Theatre are located, as well as the old Pyynikki Brewery and the Klingendahl factory property. Next door to Klingendahl is the former Tampere Epidemic Hospital, built in 1910, which was used as a student dormitory until the summer of 2009 after the hospital closed. Almost all of the residential buildings in the area are apartment buildings, built mainly in the 1960s and 1970s to replace the earlier wooden houses built in the late 19th century. The primary schools operating in Kaakinmaa are the Alexander School of the 1st–6th grades and the Pyynikki School of the 7th–9th grades (former Tampere High School for Girls). At the corner of Satamakatu and Koulukatu is the Swedish-language school (Svenska samskolan i Tammerfors), which includes grades 1-9 of the comprehensive school and the upper secondary school.

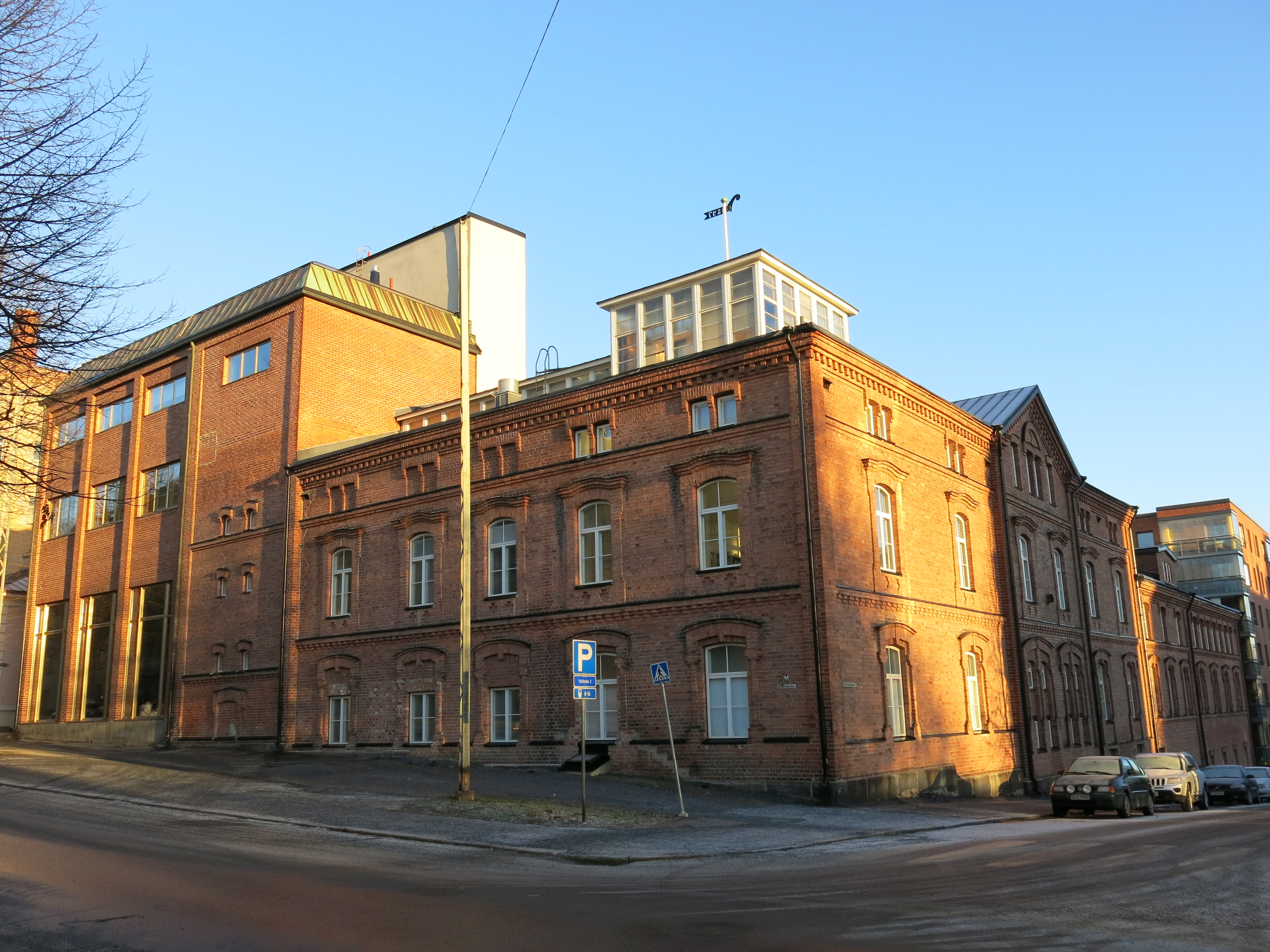
The former building of Pyynikin Brewing Company in Kaakinmaa

A brewery has previously operated in Kaakinmaa. In 1897, a brewery was established on the corner of Tiilitehtaankatu and Papinkatu, which later became Oy Pyynikki. In 1903, another brewery operating in Tampere, Oy Iso Oluttehdas, and Oy Pyynikki merged to form Näsijärven Osake-Oluttehdas, which in 1920 took the name Oy Pyynikki Ab. Until 1992, Pyynikin Brewery produced the Amiraali beer brand, which is popular with the local population and is still available in Japan with a label with the image of Admiral Tōgō Heihachirō (1848–1934) from the Tupgō flagship Mikasa's museum store in Yokosuka. The brewing business in Tampere was discontinued soon after Pyynikki Oy came under Sinebrychoff. The same fate in the hands of Sinebrychoff was later experienced by the Pori Brewery. In 2012, the Pyynikki craft brewery was established in Tampere to continue the tradition of the Pyynikki brewery, although for the time being, due to the lack of suitable premises, it operates in Rahola.

The name of Kaakinmaa derives from the kaakinpuu tree, also known as pillory, used to punish evildoers on the site of Tampere's co-educational high school until the second half of the 19th century. After the settlement of Kaakinmaa, the kaakinpuu tree was transferred to a sand pit along the current Pirkankatu, where it was located until the new penalty law abolished cropping in 1894. The town plan for Kaakinmaa was completed in 1868. In 1870, the area of Kaakinmaa was still uninhabited, but twenty years later there were already about a thousand inhabitants. At the beginning of the 20th century, the inhabitants of Kaakinmaa were mainly engaged in various professions.

On the western side of Kaakinmaa, along Mariankatu, in 1936–1973, there was a Christmas Sign Home owned by the Finnish Tuberculosis Resistance Association (Filha ry), which cared for the newborn children of mothers with tuberculosis. After the operation of the nursing home ended, the building was demolished and there is now an apartment building on its site.
