= Pirkankatu =

Street in Tampere, Finland

Coordinates: 61°29′54.6″N 23°44′09.22″E

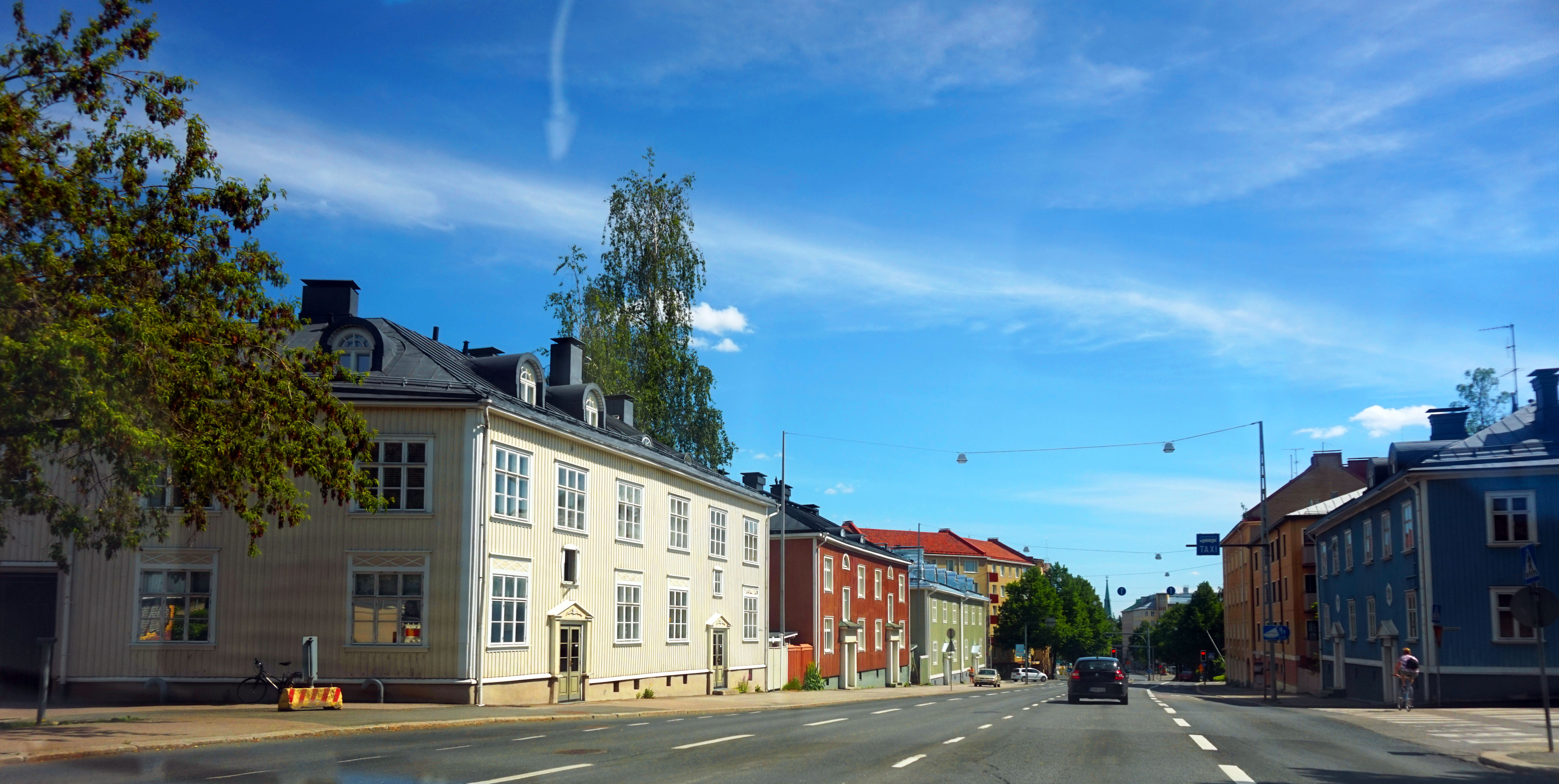
Pirkankatu in Amuri, Tampere.

Pirkankatu is a busy, east–west street in Tampere, Finland, which forms the southern border of the Amuri district. The districts of Kaakinmaa and Pyynikinrinne are located south of the street. To the east, the end of Pirkankatu is the Hämeenpuisto park, in the middle stages of which it connects to Hämeenkatu. In the west, on the border of Pispala, Pirkankatu becomes the Pispala Highway.

Pirkankatu is one of the driveways leading to the city center, and it is one of the main routes used by Tampere public transport. In 2021, the Tampere tramway art stop designed by sculptor Jaakko Himanen was completed on Pirkankatu, in front of Pyynikintori. Pyynikintori is the terminus of the first stage of the tramway, from where trams run through the city center to Hervanta.

At the eastern end of Pirkankatu is the cityscape and historically significant Pyynikki Church Park, where the landscape is dominated by the Alexander Church (1881). Across the street is the nationally significant Central Library Metso (1986), designed by architects Raili and Reima Pietilä. Most of the residential buildings on Pirkankatu are wooden houses built in the 1920s. Such is, for example, the 138-meter-long Kilometritalo (1923). The most notable of the stone apartment buildings is Veljeslinna (1952), which is part of a large, sealed city block, which is rare compared to typical Tamperean architecture.

== See also ==
- Hallituskatu (Tampere)
- Satakunnankatu
