= Metso (disambiguation) =

Metso was a Finnish industrial company that existed from 1999 to 2020.

Metso may also refer to:

- Metso (2020–present), a Finnish industrial company
- Metso (surname), a Finnish-language surname
- Tampere Central Library, in Finland, also known as Metso
