= Teemu =

Teemu is a Finnish male given name. Notable people with the name include:

- Teemu Aalto (born 1978), Finnish professional ice hockey player
- Teemu Eronen (born 1990), professional ice hockey defenceman
- Teemu Hartikainen (born 1990), Finnish professional ice hockey player
- Teemu Kankkunen (born 1980), Finnish footballer
- Teemu Kattilakoski (born 1977), Finnish cross country skier who has been competing since 1996
- Teemu Keisteri (born 1985), Finnish visual artist and DJ
- Teemu Kesä (born 1981), Finnish professional ice hockey defenceman
- Teemu Laakso (born 1987), ice hockey defenceman
- Teemu Laine (born 1982), professional Finnish ice hockey player
- Teemu Lassila (born 1983), Finnish professional ice hockey goaltender
- Teemu Lehtilä (born 1966), Finnish actor
- Teemu Mäki (born 1967), Finnish artist
- Teemu Mäntysaari (born 1987), guitarist for the band Megadeth
- Teemu Metso (born 1985), Finnish professional ice hockey player
- Teemu Normio (born 1980), Finnish professional ice hockey player
- Teemu Nurmi (born 1985), Finnish ice hockey player
- Teemu Pukki (born 1990), Finnish footballer who plays as a striker
- Teemu Pulkkinen (born 1992), Finnish professional ice hockey winger
- Teemu Raimoranta (1977–2003), Finnish metal musician
- Teemu Ramstedt (born 1987), is a Finnish professional ice hockey centre
- Teemu Rannikko (born 1980), Finnish professional basketball player
- Teemu Rautiainen (born 1992), Finnish professional ice hockey player
- Teemu Riihijärvi (born 1977), Finnish former professional ice hockey forward
- Teemu Rinkinen, Finnish professional ice hockey forward
- Teemu Salo (born 1974), Finnish curler from Hyvinkaa
- Teemu Selänne (born 1970), Finnish professional ice hockey winger
- Teemu Sippo SCI (born 1947), the former Roman Catholic Bishop of Helsinki
- Teemu Summanen (born 1975), Finnish Nordic combined skier
- Teemu Tainio (born 1979), Finnish footballer
- Teemu Tallberg, Finnish professional ice hockey forward
- Teemu Turunen (born 1986), Finnish footballer, who plays as a midfielder
- Teemu Virtanen (born 1990), Finnish professional ice hockey player
- Teemu Vuorisalo (born 1995), Finnish ice hockey player
- Teemu Wirkkala (born 1984), Finnish javelin thrower

== See also ==
- Temu (disambiguation)
