= Alexander Church =

Church in Tampere, Finland

Tampere Alexander Church Tampereen Aleksanterin kirkko Tammerfors Alexanderskyrkan
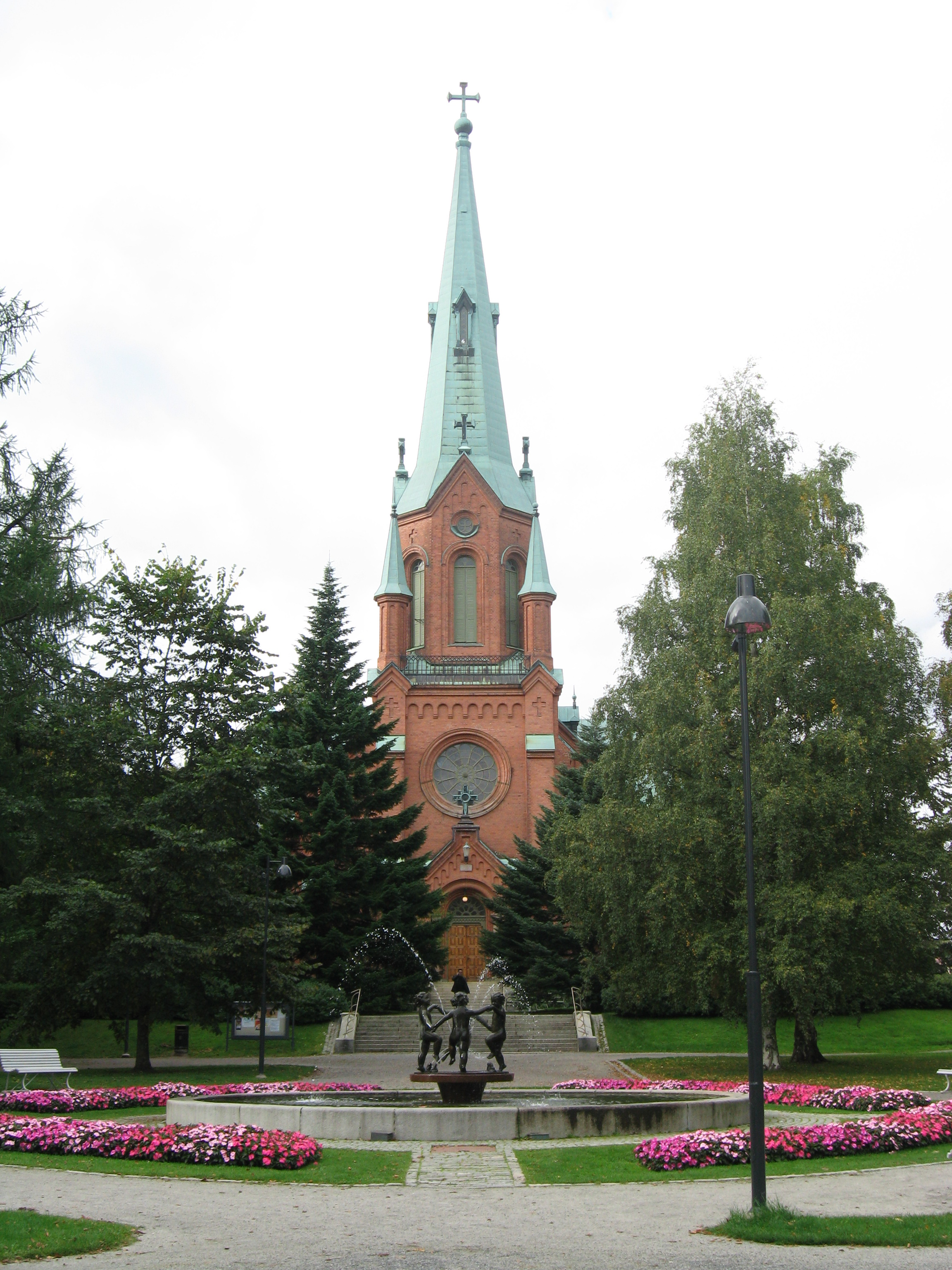
- The Alexander Church

Religion
- Affiliation: Evangelical Lutheran Church of Finland
- Ecclesiastical or organizational status: Church (building)

Location
- Location: Kaakinmaa, Tampere, Finland
- Interactive map of Tampere Alexander Church; Tampereen Aleksanterin kirkko Tammerfors Alexanderskyrkan
- Coordinates: 61°29′50″N 023°44′57″E

Architecture
- Architect: Theodor Decker
- Style: Gothic Revival architecture
- Completed: 1881

Specifications
- Capacity: 1,430
- Materials: Brick

The Alexander Church (Finnish: Aleksanterin kirkko; Swedish: Alexanderskyrkan) is a stone church in Tampere, Finland, and it is part of the Tampere Cathedral Parish. It is located in the Kaakinmaa district in the city center of Tampere, on the edge of the Hämeenpuisto park along the Pirkankatu street. The church, designed by architect Theodor Decker, was built of brick between 1880 and 1881. It is named after Emperor Alexander II of Russia. The church is surrounded by Pyynikki Church Park (Pyynikin kirkkopuisto), a former cemetery.

The church is a long church with a tower, the short sides of which have short cross-arms at the polygonal choir end. The facade of the church is dominated by large round and circular windows and protruding pillars, which, however, have no structural significance but are purely architectural decorative elements. The upper lofts of the three-aisled church hall covered with wood are supported by brick pillars. The church, which pursues a continental cathedral style, represents a later neo-Gothic style with influences from different styles.

The church has 1,430 seats. The church has a 56+3-voice electro-pneumatic pipe organ built by the Kangasala's organ factory from 1939. The altarpiece was painted by Alexandra Frosterus-Såltin in 1883 and is called "The Glory of Christ".

As a rule, the church hosts the St. Thomas Mass about every three weeks.

== History ==
Until 1904, Tampere belonged to the parish of Messukylä. The main church of the parish was the old greystone church of Messukylä. As early as the 1820s, the people of Tampere had demanded the establishment of their own city church and their release from the maintenance of the Messukylä Church, but in the end the Finnish Senate rejected the proposal. The Turku Judicial Chapter also rejected similar proposals in 1847 and 1853. In 1869, the Senate finally approved the proposal, but imposed two conditions. According to the second condition, the pastor of Messukylä had to be “resigned”, i.e. the vacancy to be filled. However, Josef Grönberg, who started as the pastor of Messukylä in 1861, lived to be almost 90 years old and did not die until 1903. Another of the conditions set by the Senate was the construction of a new church building.

The church was consecrated on Advent in 1881, when it became the main church of the Tampere City Parish. The fire almost completely destroyed the church in 1937, when its first renovation was nearing completion. However, the work was completed and the repair was completed in December 1938.
