= Pyynikinrinne =

City district in Tampere, Finland

Coordinates: 61.49564112907187°N 23.741060588051774°E

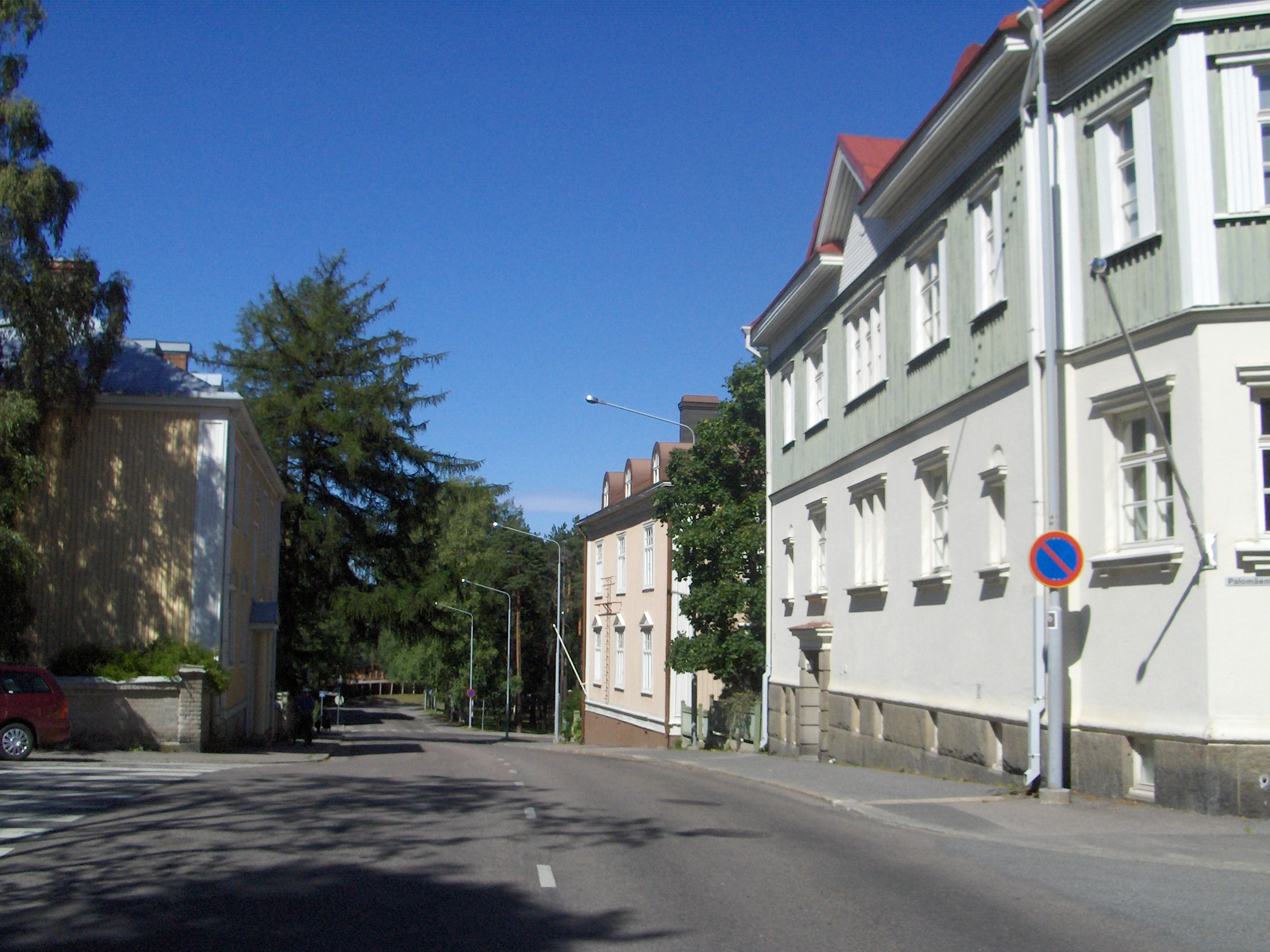
Pyynikinrinne

Pyynikinrinne is a district of Tampere, Finland. It is located west of the city center. Pyynikinrinne is bordered on the south by the Pyynikki Esker nature reserve, on the north by Pirkankatu and on the east by Mariankatu. The western boundary of the district is the former border between Tampere and Pohjois-Pirkkala municipalities. The neighboring parts of the city are Pyynikki, Ylä-Pispala, Amuri, partly Särkänniemi and Kaakinmaa.

Pirkankatu, which has long been a highway from the center of Tampere to the western parts of the city, was called the Pirkkala Highway until 1956. The Tipotie road, which once led across the Tampere–Pori railway line to the shores of Lake Näsijärvi, diverges from Pirkankatu at the former Tampere City Transport's department garage, also known as Rollikkahalli.

A competition was held for the design of the Pyynikinrinne area, which was won in 1903 by architect Lars Sonck. The town plan drawn up by Sonck was confirmed in 1907. The town plan was in line with Art Nouveau ideals: blocks of varying sizes and shapes, streets following terrain and end views of the streets. The building stock of Pyynikinrinne is mainly protected. A particularly interesting object from an architectural point of view is the complex of villas bordering Palomäentie.

The oldest surviving building stock on Pyynikinrinne is represented by, among others, Marjatta Hospital (Lambert Pettersson, 1912), the Technical School (R. Björnberg, 1912), the Durchman House (Oiva Kallio, 1915) and the Olán House (Wivi Lönn, 1916). Most of the district was built in the 1920s. The typical Pyynikinrinne Building Type is a two-storey wooden apartment building representing the classicism of the 1920s. The arm of Pyynikintori was built at the turn of the 1920s and 1930s from taller stone houses, designed by Martti Välikangas, Yrjö Lindegren, Jaakko Tähtinen and Veikko Kallio, among others.

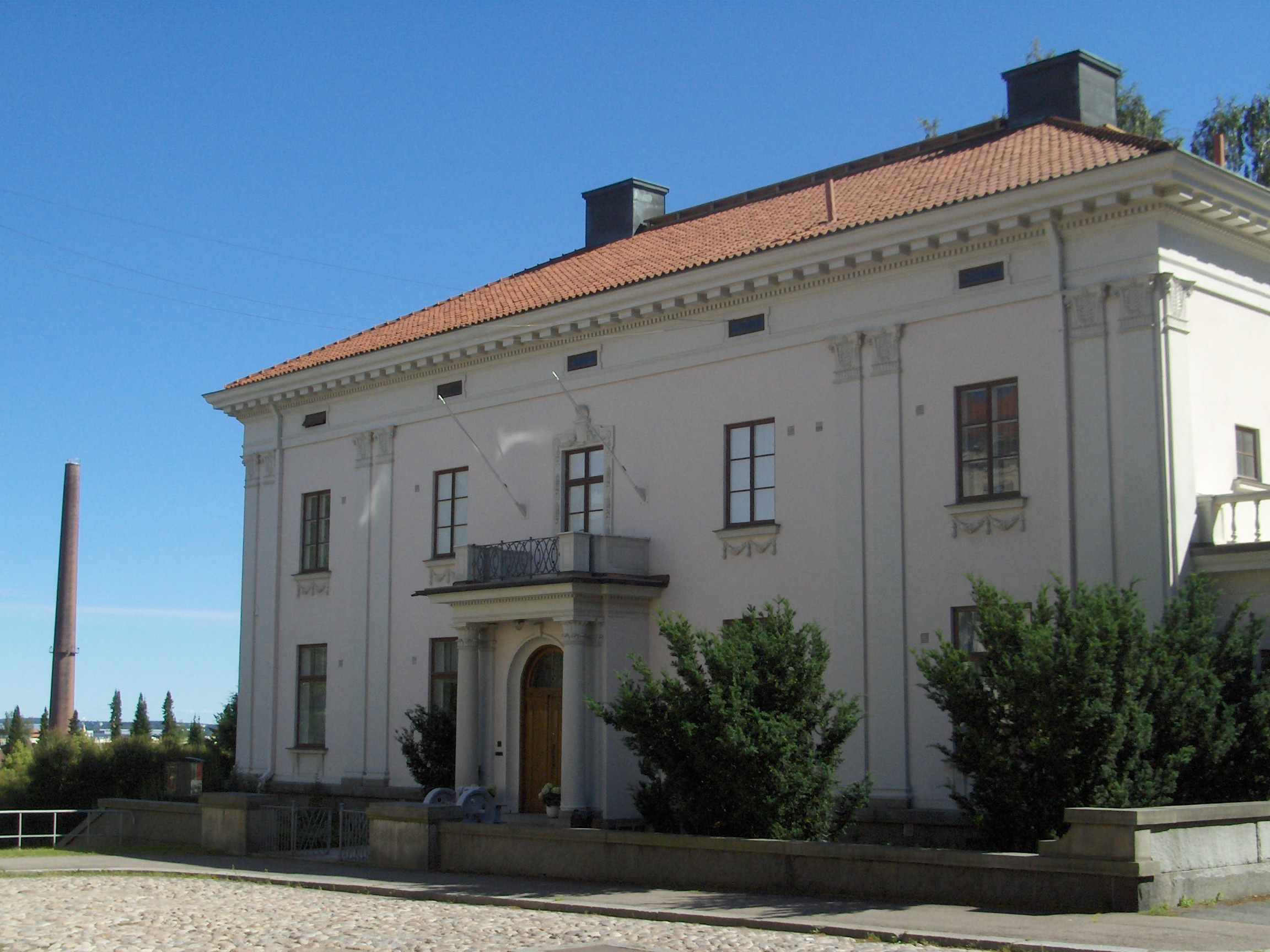
Pyynikinlinna, also known as Emil Aaltonen Museum

Architect Bertel Strömmer has had a special influence on the nature of Pyynikinrinne. Strömmer designed a large part of the Pyynikinrinne buildings and partially modified Sonck's town plan. Palomäentie 13 was Strömmer's first plan in his own name. Strömmer lived and kept his office at Palomäentie 22, a building that has since been demolished. Strömmer's surviving works in the Pyynikinrinne district include Pyynikki Sports Field with its auditorium (1922), Kisakentänkatu 10–14 (1924–25), Pyynikki Parish House (1928) and the vocational school (1939). After graduation, the vocational school was the largest public building in Tampere. Other significant buildings in the area include Pyynikinlinna (Jarl Eklund, 1923), Haapanen Villa (Veikko Kallio, 1929), Tampere Lyceum High School (Hjalmar Åberg and A. Willberg, 1935), Bishop's Residence (Gunnar Wahlroos, 1936) and Tampere Conservatoire. A special feature is Kilometritalo (Heikki Tiitola, 1923); this two-story residential building is 138 meters long.

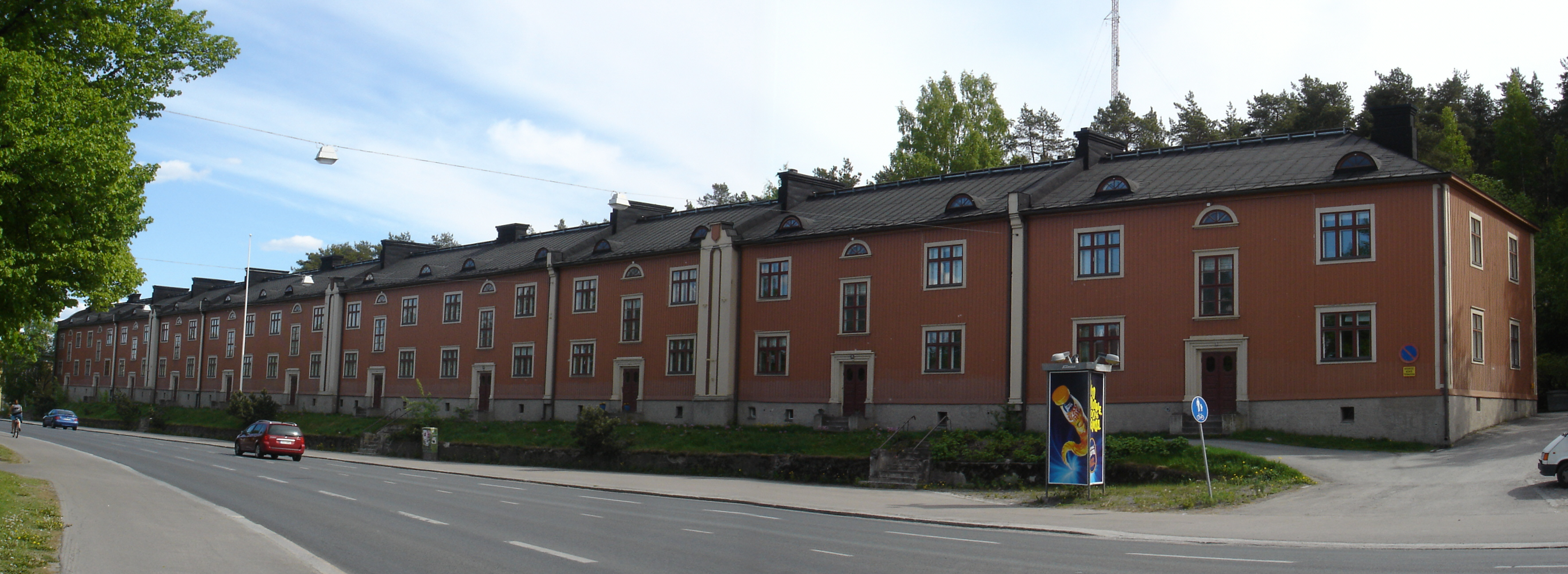
Kilometritalo at the Pirkankatu street

Pyynikintori, formerly known as Aleksanterintori or, familiarly, Plassi, once served as a marketplace and a center for horse trade. Domestic animals, including goats, cows, sheep and piglets, were sold at the Heinätori square, which is connected to Pyynikintori. In memory of the market square there is so-called Vaakahuone building (Lambert Petterson, 1913) between Heinätori and Pyynikintori. Today, Pyynikintori mainly operates as a bus terminal and parking area. The first bus station building in Finland, the western long-distance bus station (Bertel Strömmer, 1929), was built on Pyynikintori. An almost similar building was built for Tampere's eastern long-distance bus station, which was located in the Sori Square near the current bus station. The original station buildings functioned as service stations after the completion of the current Tampere Bus Station (1938) and have since been demolished.

The Pyynikki sports field serves as a starting point and goal for women marathon event called Likkojen Lenkki, among other things. The Pyynikki Hall is a national and international venue for several indoor sports, such as volleyball and basketball. In addition, there is a small sports field along Palomäentie called Pikkusantamonttu.

On the Pyynikinrinne, the Tampere Vocational College Tredu operates in three locations: Pyynikintie, Pirkankatu and Santalahdentie. Areas of study emphasize craftsmanship, such as the fashion industry, the barber-hairdresser line, and the electrical and construction engineering industry.

== See also ==
- Pyynikinharju
