= Temu (disambiguation) =

Temu is an e-commerce platform owned by PDD Holdings.

Temu may also refer to:

- Temu (plant), a monotypic genus of plants in family Myrtaceae
- Temù, a comune in Lombardy, Italy
- Luma apiculata or temu, a species of flowering plant in the myrtle family
- Pusô or temu, a rice cake cooked in woven coconut leaves

== People with the surname ==
- Hoyce Temu, Tanzanian beauty pageant winner
- Naftali Temu, Kenyan athlete
- Puka Temu, Papua New Guinean politician

== See also ==
- Teemu, a given name
- Timu (disambiguation)
- Atum, an important deity in Egyptian mythology, sometimes rendered as Temu.
- TEMU1000 and TEMU2000, railway vehicles used by Taiwan Railway
