= Metso (surname) =

Metso means Western capercaillie in Finnish. Notable people with the surname include:

- Frida Johansson Metso (born 1984), Swedish politician
- Teemu Metso (born 1985), Finnish ice hockey player
