= Ratina (district) =

City district in Tampere, Finland

Coordinates: 61°29′37″N 23°46′00″E

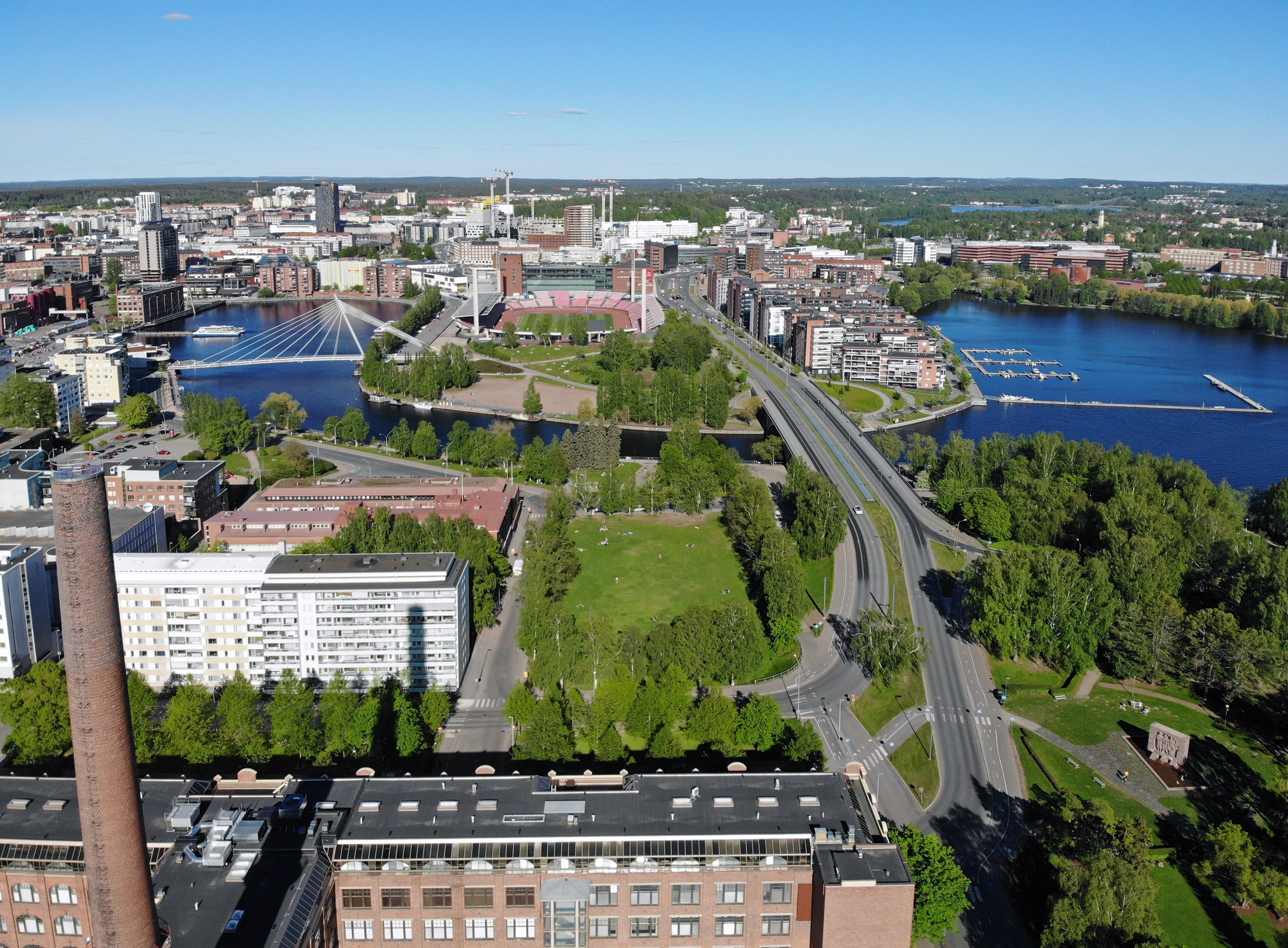
An aerial view of the Ratinanniemi area

Ratina is a district in the center of Tampere, Finland, on the east side of Tammerkoski. The Ratina Stadium, Tampere Bus Station and Tampere's largest shopping mall, the Ratina shopping centre, are located in the district, among others. To the north of Ratina is also the Koskikeskus shopping centre. The district consists of a peninsula called Ratinanniemi, which is surrounded on three sides by Ratinansuvanto and Viinikanlahti. Between Ratinanniemi and the Laukontori square is a pedestrian bridge called Laukonsilta, which significantly shortens travel time to the city center. The Tampere highway has good connections to the Helsinki-Tampere motorway and along it to the Tampere Ring Road, and via the Ratinansilta bridge and the Hämeenpuisto park to Highway 12. Ratinanranta is the southern part of the Tampere highway from Ratina, which used to be a recreation ground and factory area. Its new construction into a dense apartment building area of 1,000 inhabitants began in 2008, and the latest residential buildings east of the Voimakatu street are expected to be completed in 2013.

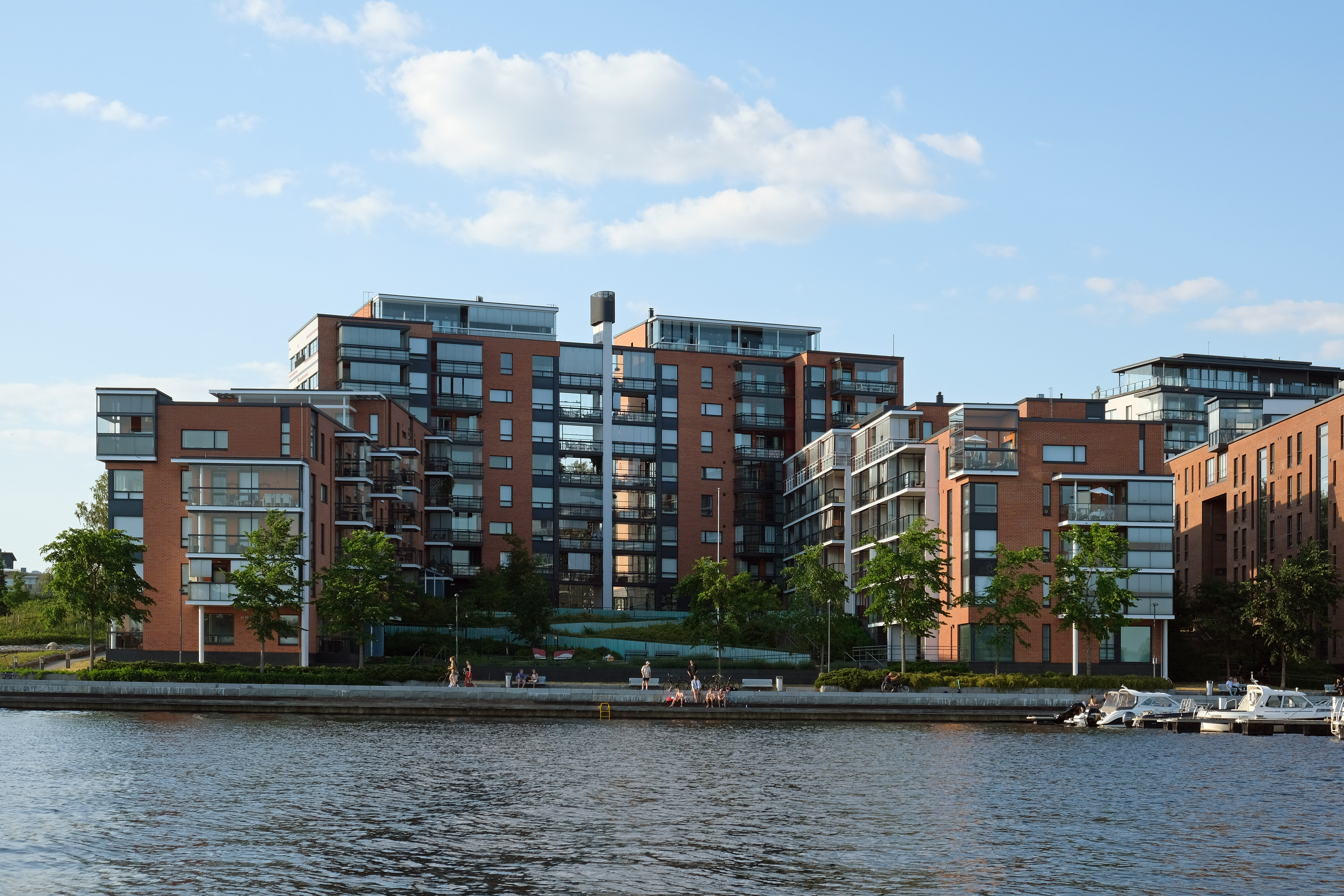
Buildings in the Ratinanranta area

The name ratina probably dates back to the road meaning rata. Ratinanniemi, which lies between the Ratina Reservoir and Lake Pyhäjärvi's Viinikanlahti, remained uninhabited for a long time, until a few residential buildings began to rise there in the late 19th century. In 1874 a glass factory was built on the peninsula and a dozen years later two machine shops, but all these companies remained short-lived. Later, a brick factory and the city's electric power station operated in the area. The first town plan for the Ratinanniemi district was completed in 1886, according to which a total of 57 residential estates were reserved in the area, the smallest of which were for villa buildings. The plan for the eastern part of the Ratina district, with an area reserved for a new bus station, was confirmed in 1935.

== See also ==
- Hatanpää
- Kyttälä
