= Tampere Workers' Theatre =

Theatre in Tampere, Finland

Coordinates: 61°29′43″N 023°45′06″E

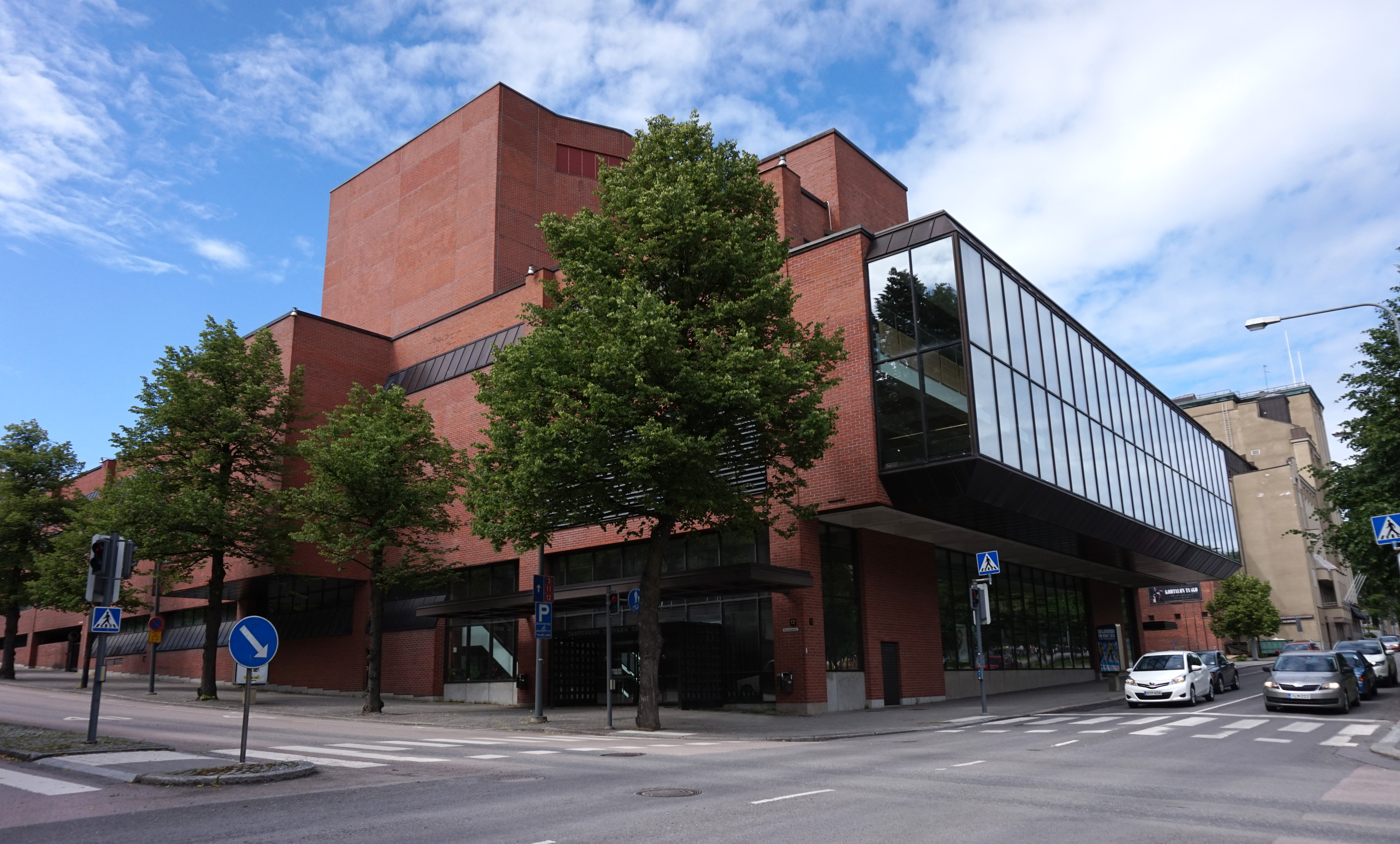
Tampere Workers' Theatre

The Tampere Workers' Theatre (Finnish: Tampereen Työväen Teatteri) or the TTT-Theatre is one of the two main active theatres in Kaakinmaa, Tampere, Finland, along with the Tampere Theatre (Finnish: Tampereen Teatteri).

Founded in 1901, the Tampere Workers' Theatre put on its first play – Anna Liisa by Minna Canth – on 27 September of that year.
