= Keskusta, Tampere =

Coordinates: 61°29′52″N 23°45′39″E

Keskusta
- District of Tampere
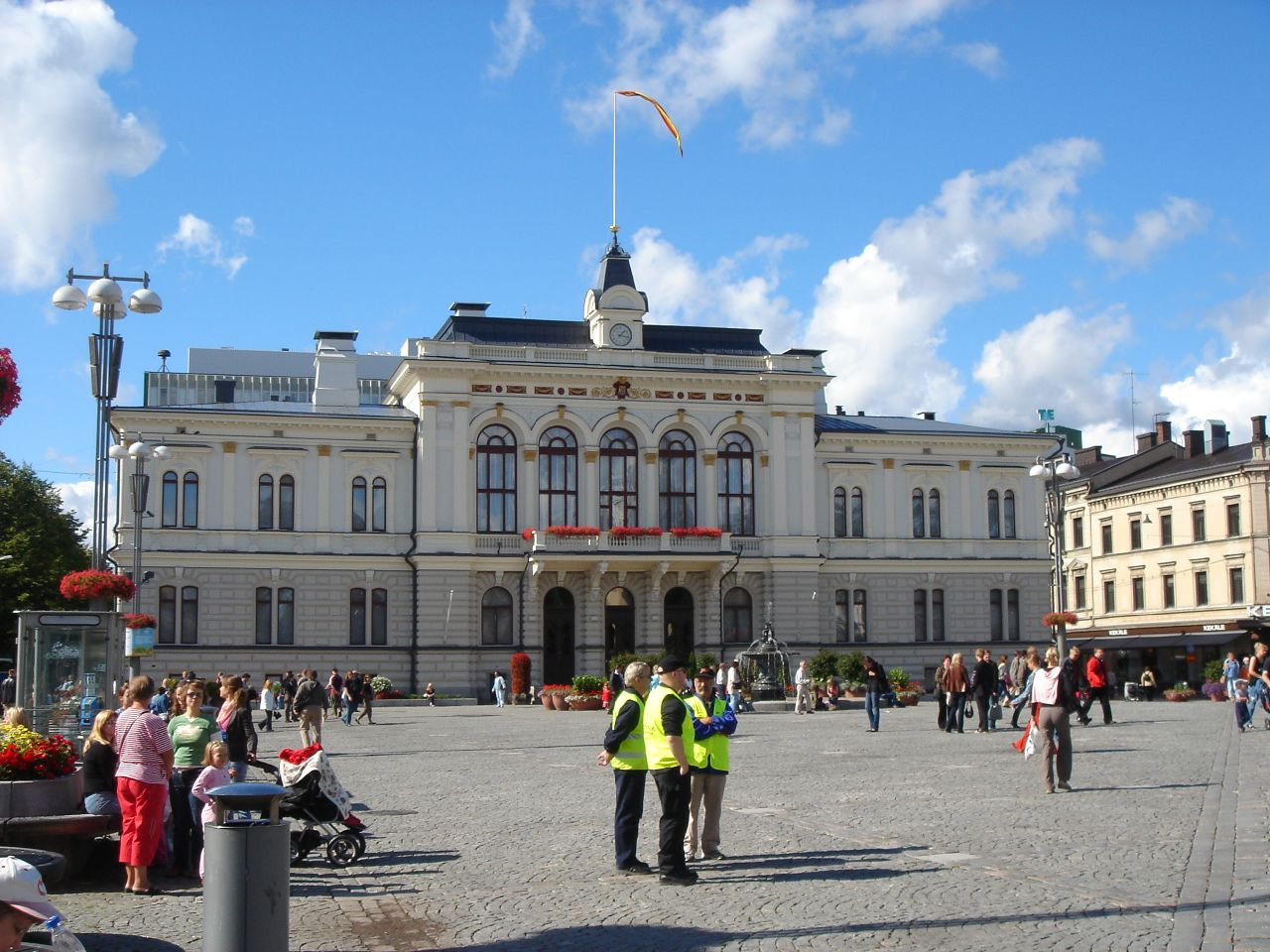
- Tampere City Hall in the center
- Country: Finland
- Province: Western Finland
- Region: Pirkanmaa
- Sub-region: Tampere sub-region
- City: Tampere
- Subdivision: Keskinen

Population (2017)
  - Total: 63,055
- Time zone: UTC+2 (EET)
  - Summer (DST): UTC+3 (EEST)

Keskusta ("City Centre") is a main district of the city of Tampere, Finland, formed by less than 20 suburbs in the city centre. Over 63,000 people live in Keskusta. It is located along the Tammerkoski rapids and its most important services include Tampere City Hall and the Market Hall.

== Districts ==
Finlayson, Nalkala, Amuri, Kaakinmaa, Pyynikinrinne, Särkänniemi, Tampella, Jussinkylä, Kyttälä, Ratina, Osmonmäki, Tammela, Tulli, Kalevanharju, Hatanpää, Pyynikki.

== Gallery ==
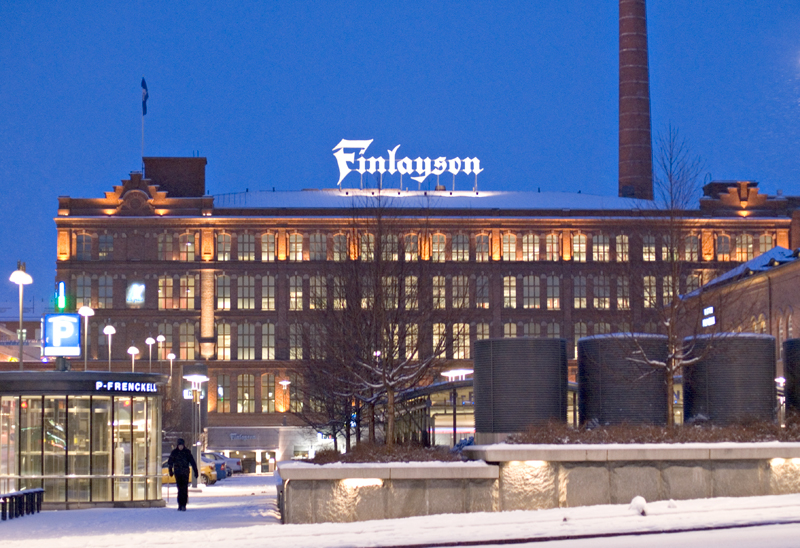
Finlayson industrial building

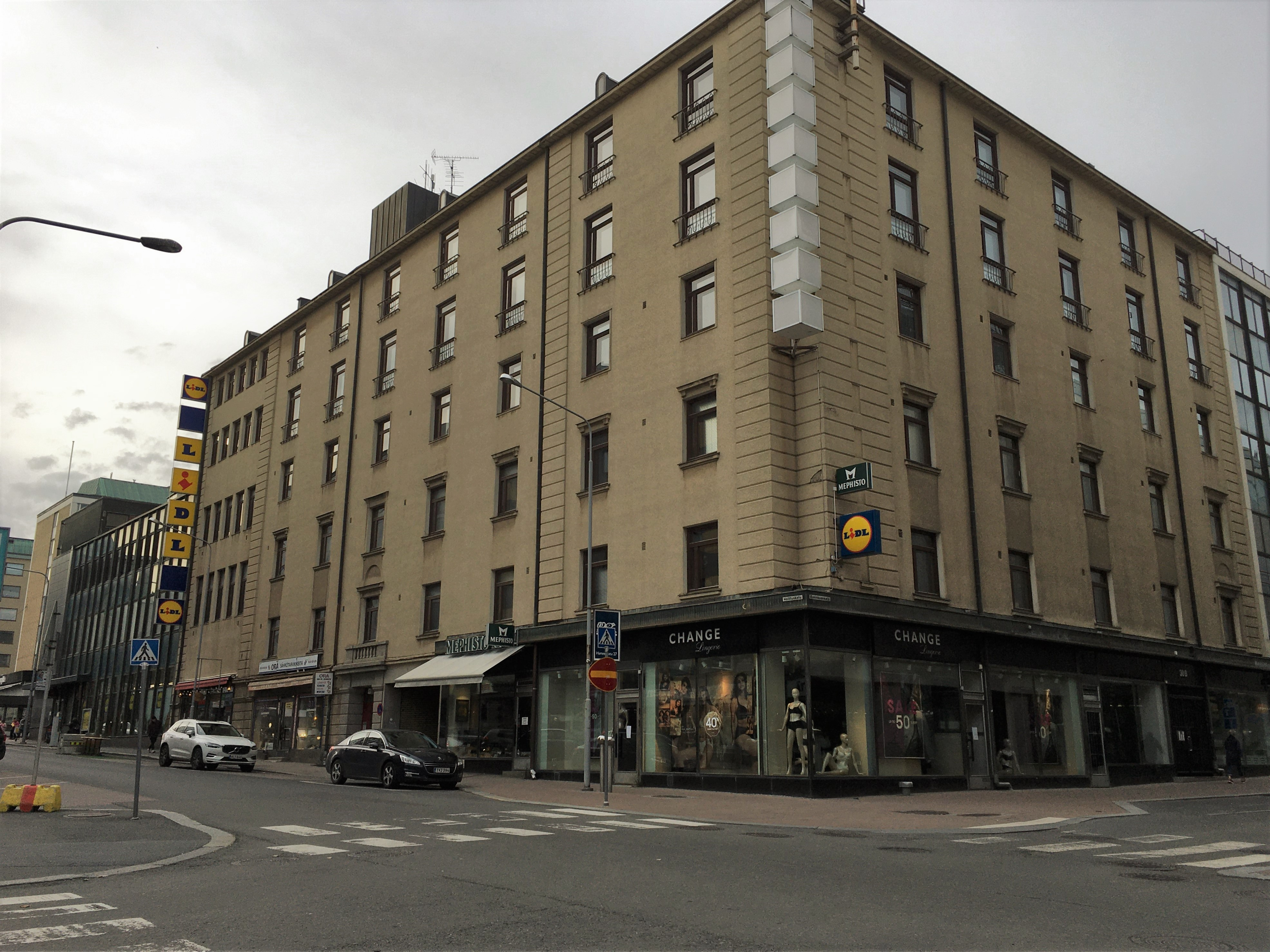
Aamulehti office building in Nalkala

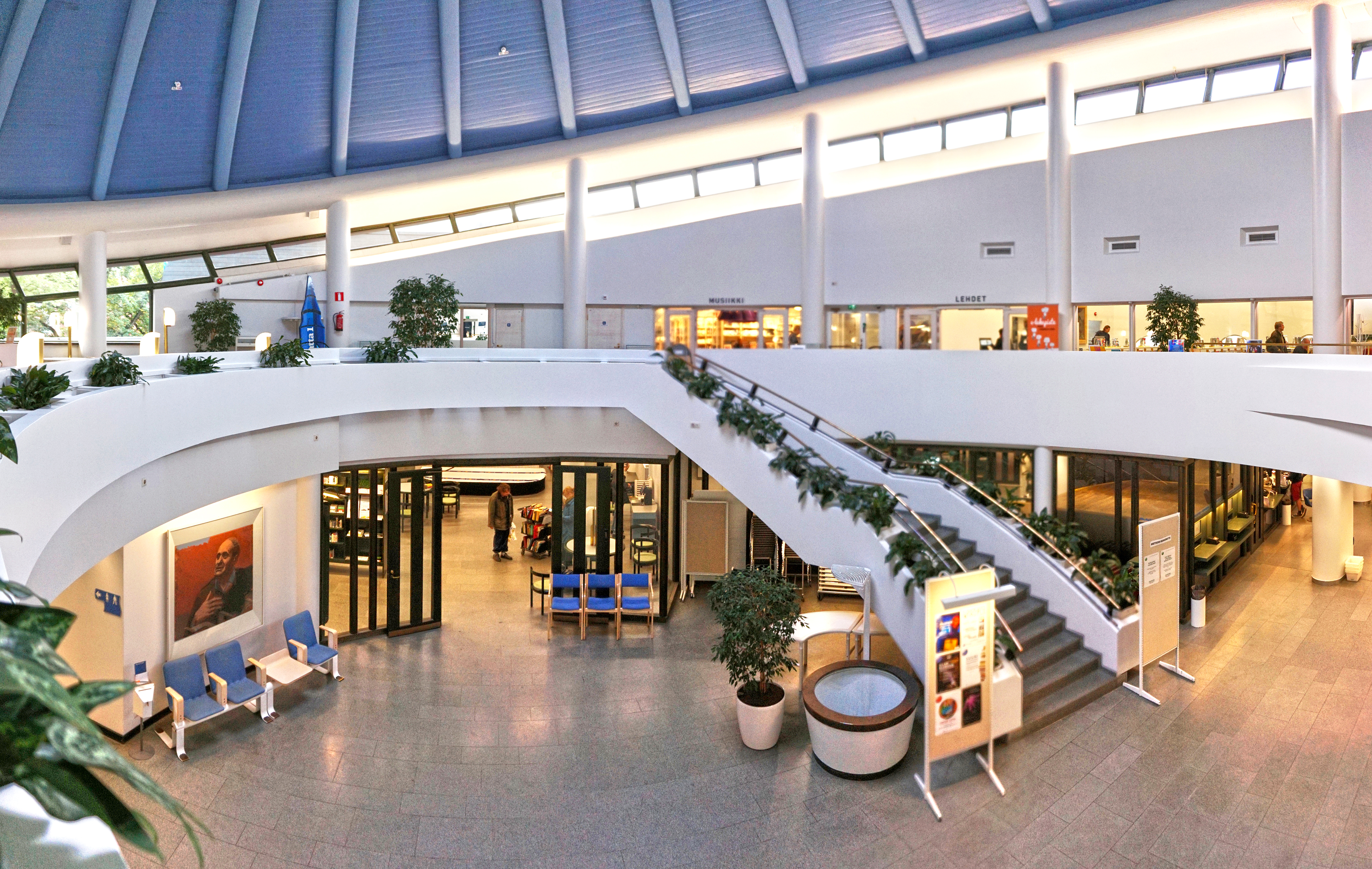
Tampere Central Library in Amuri

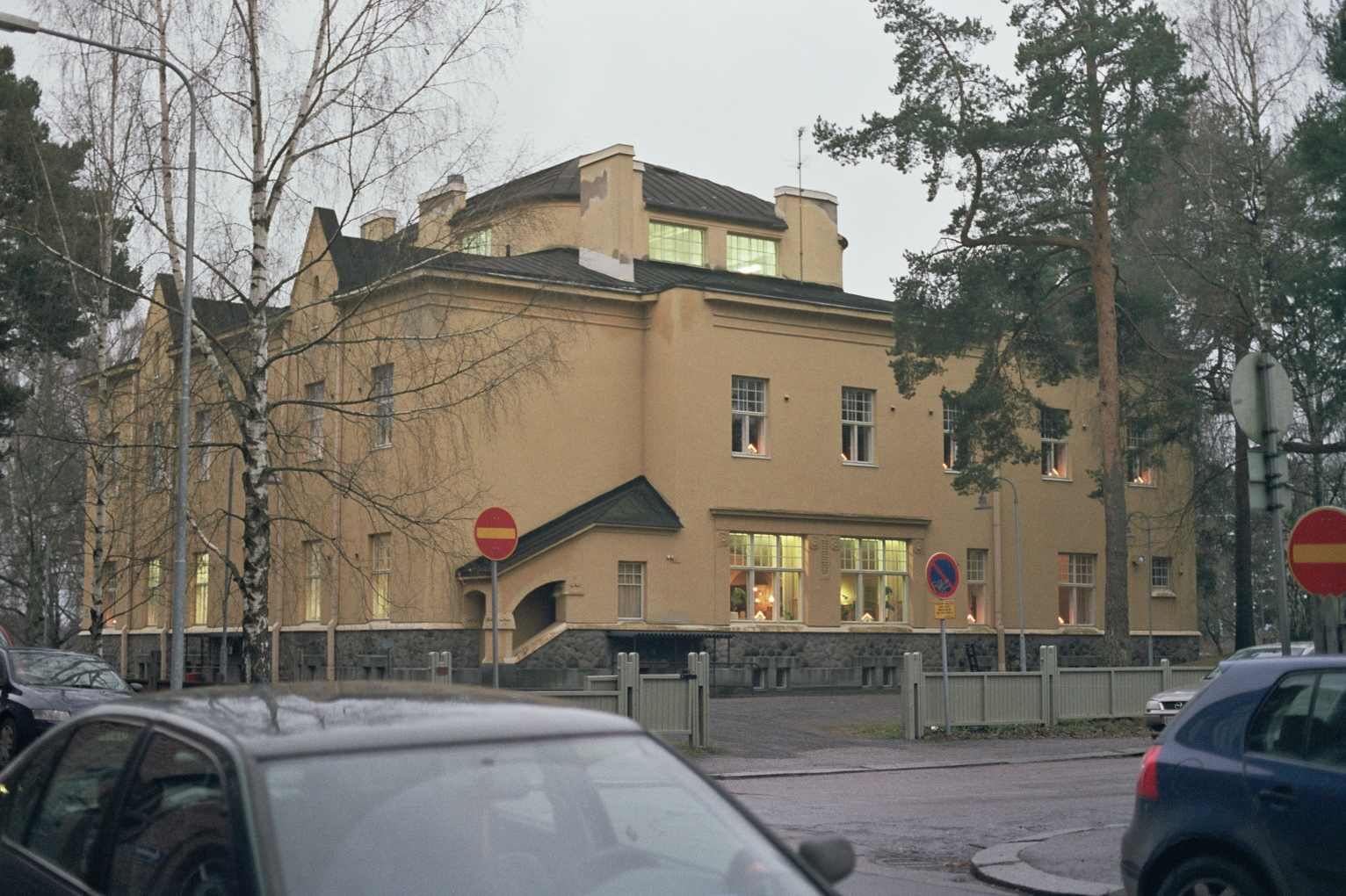
Pirkanmaa Music Institute in Kaakinmaa

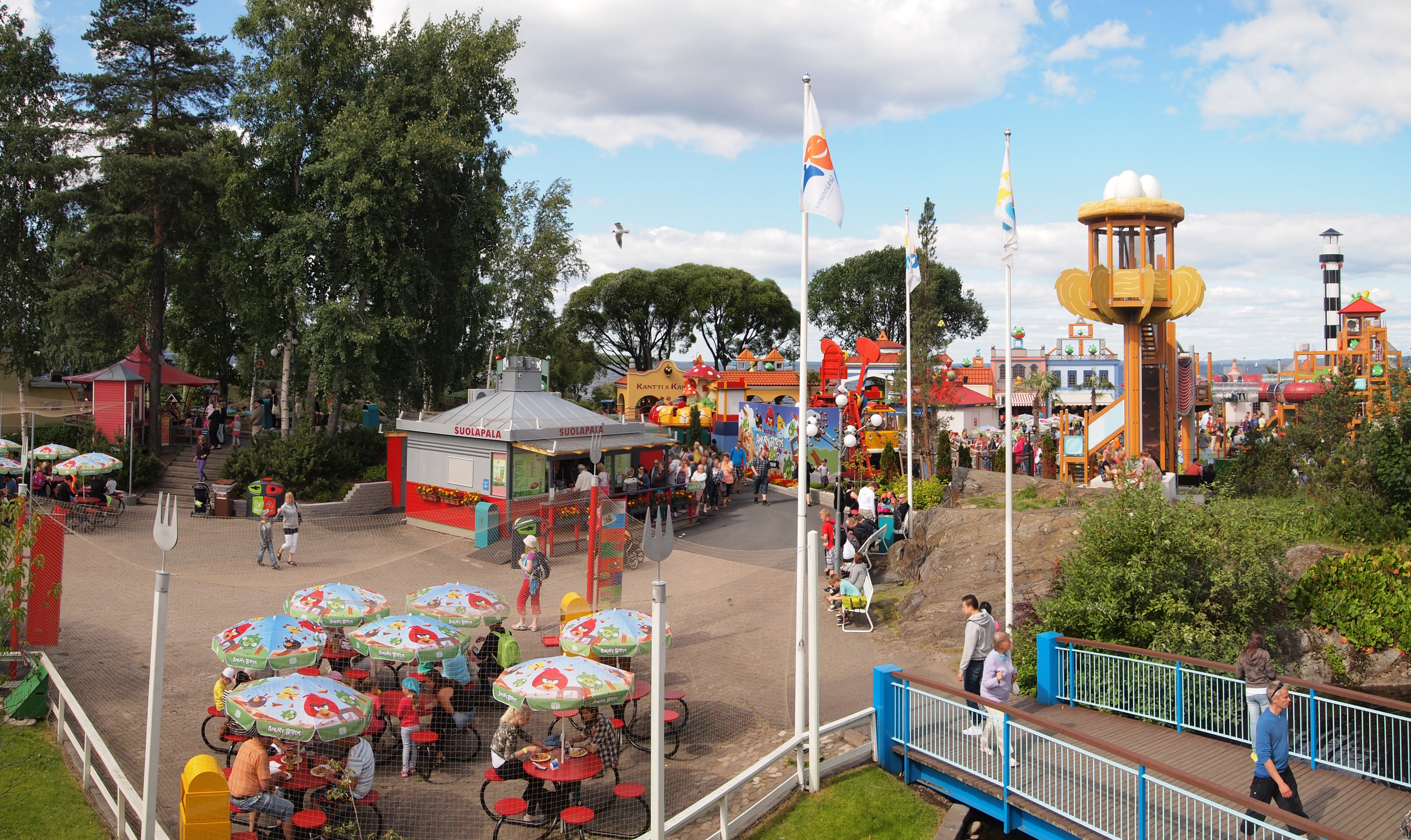
Särkänniemi amusement park

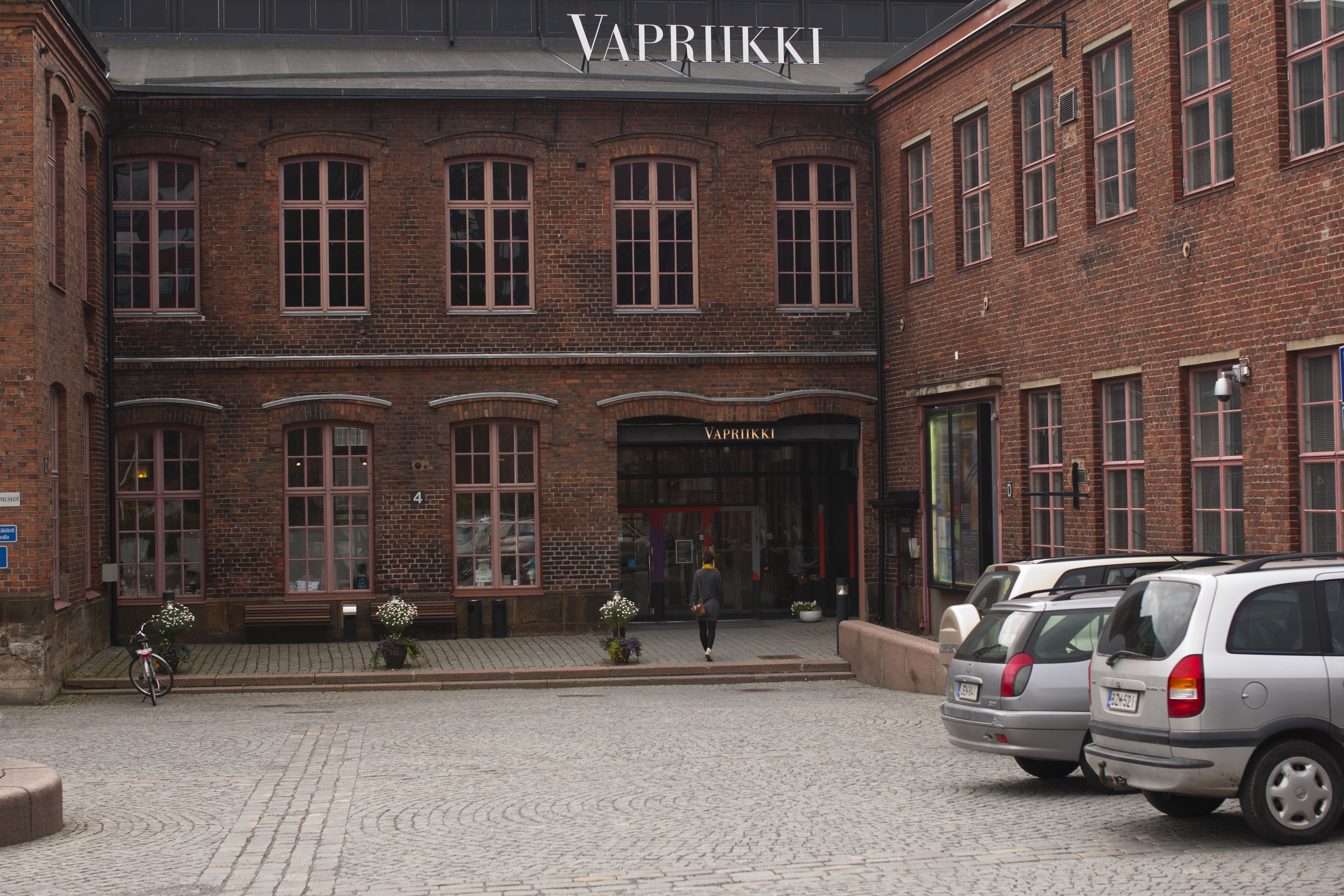
Vapriikki Museum Centre in Tampella

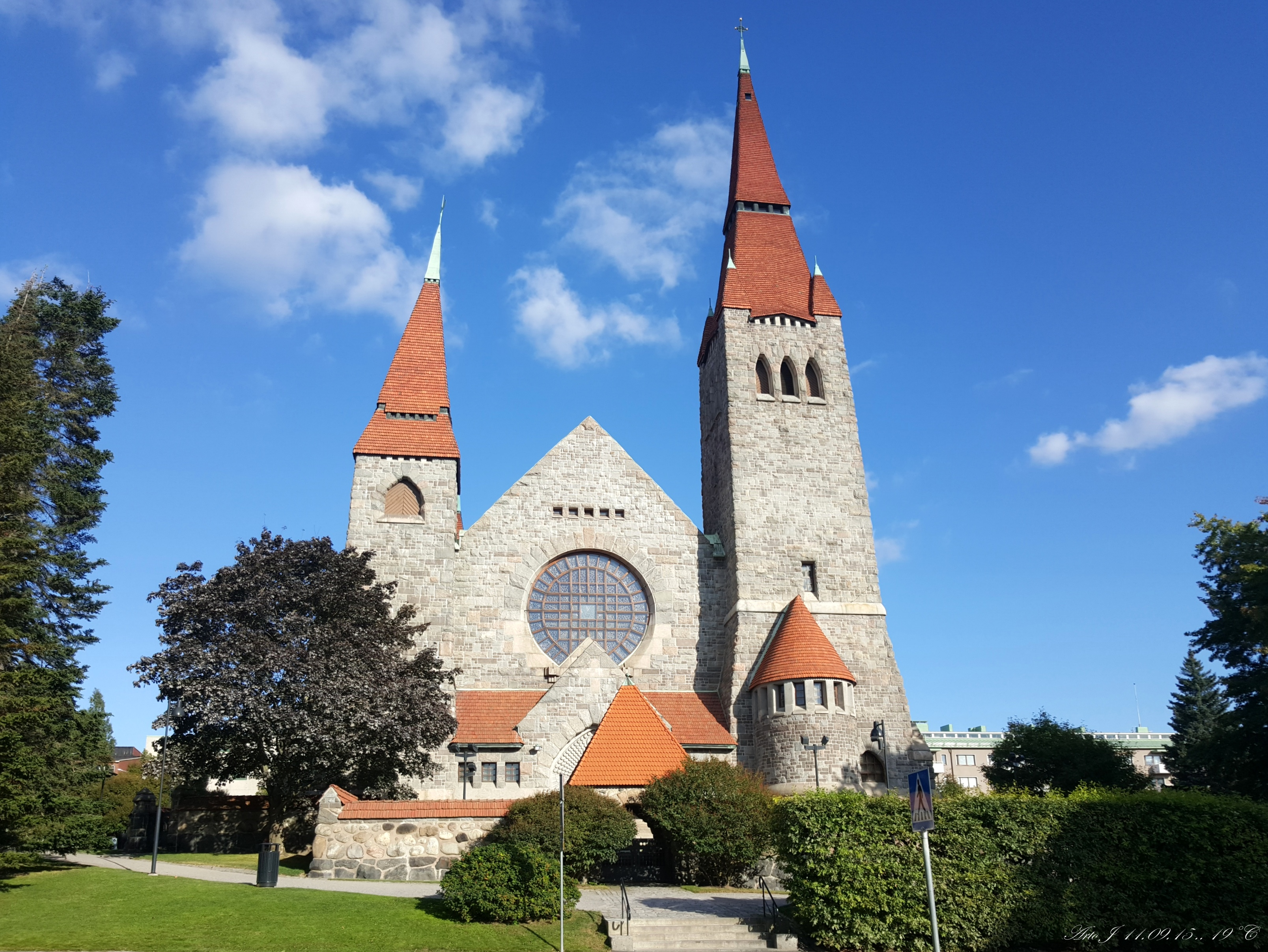
Tampere Cathedral in Jussinkylä

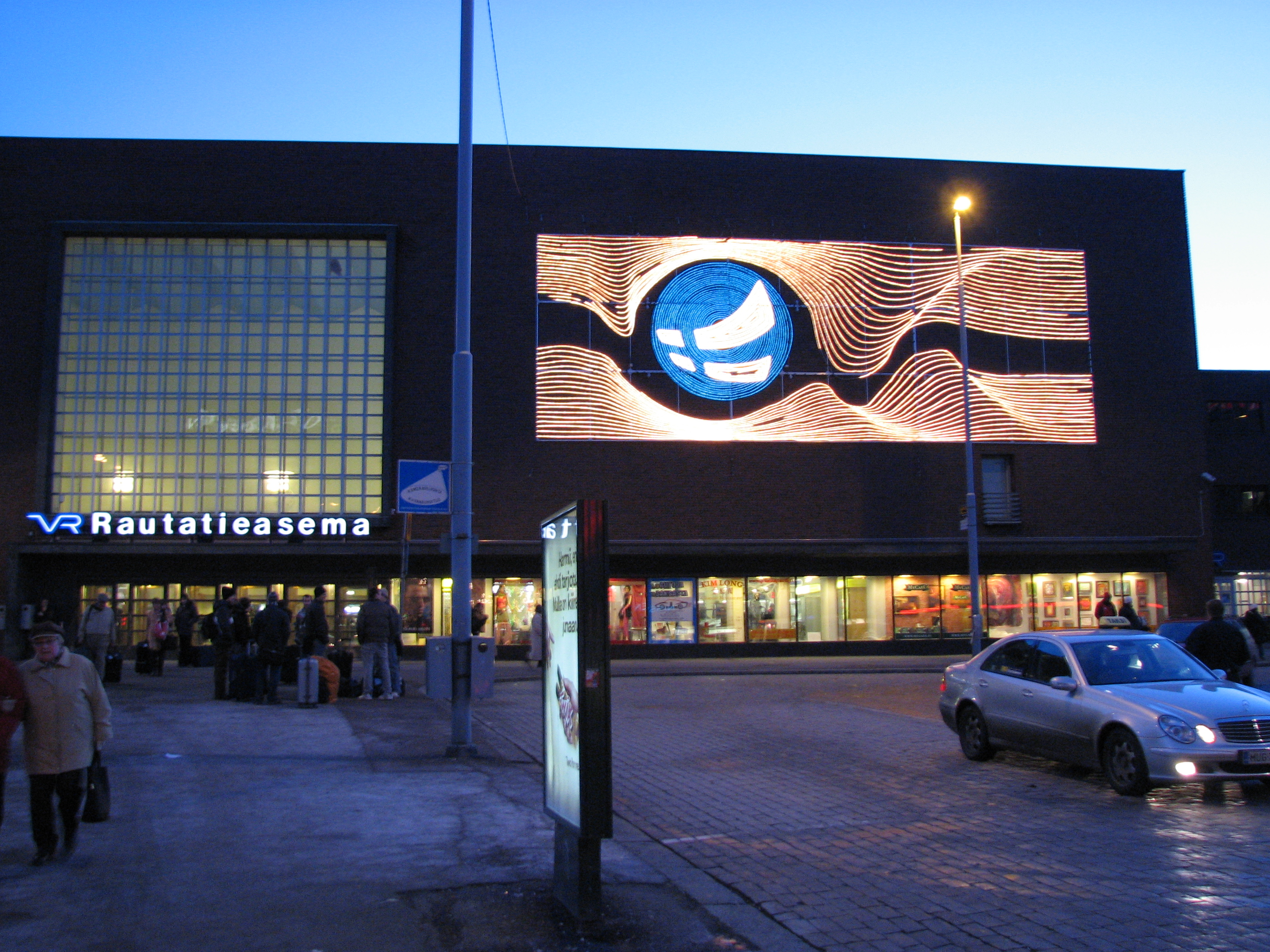
Tampere Central Station in Kyttälä

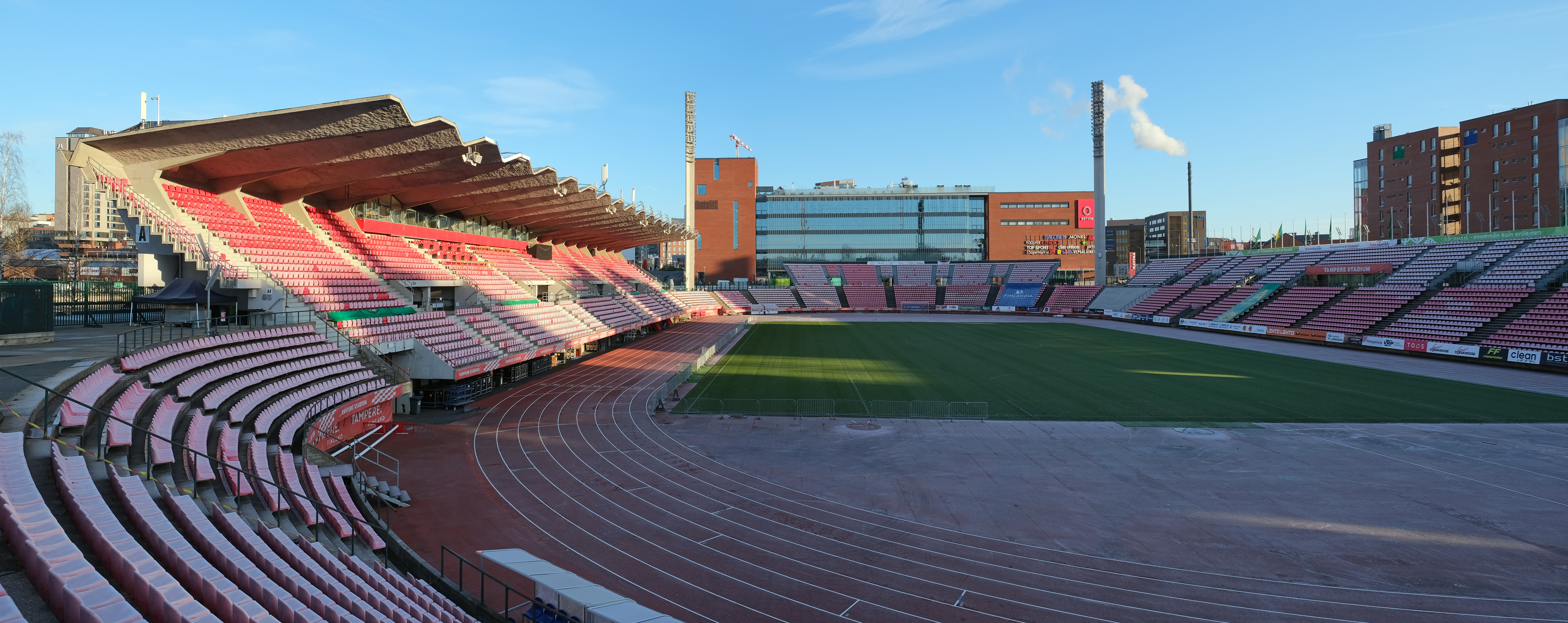
Tampere Stadium in Ratina

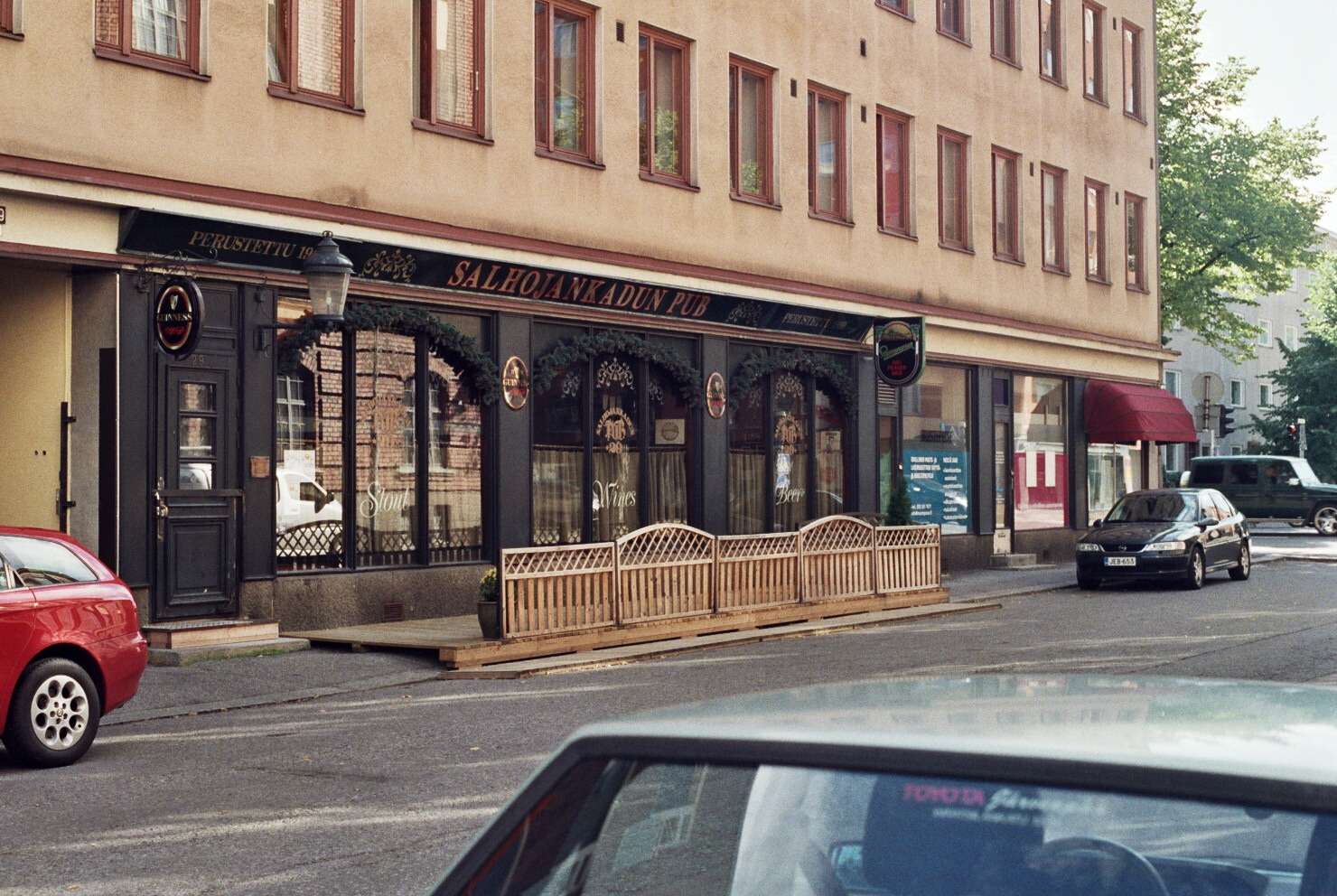
Salhojankadun Pub, a local bar in Tammela

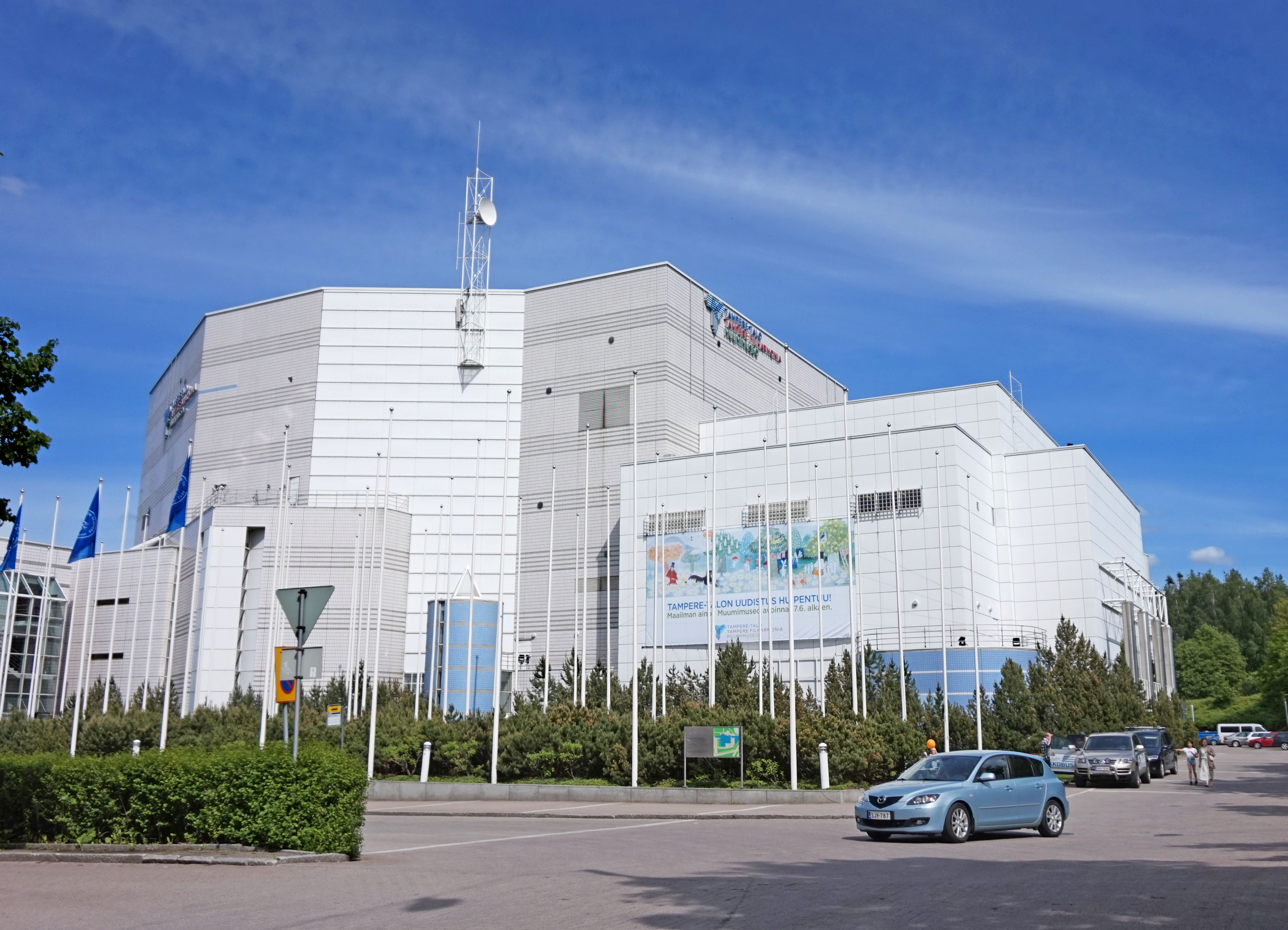
Tampere Hall in Tulli

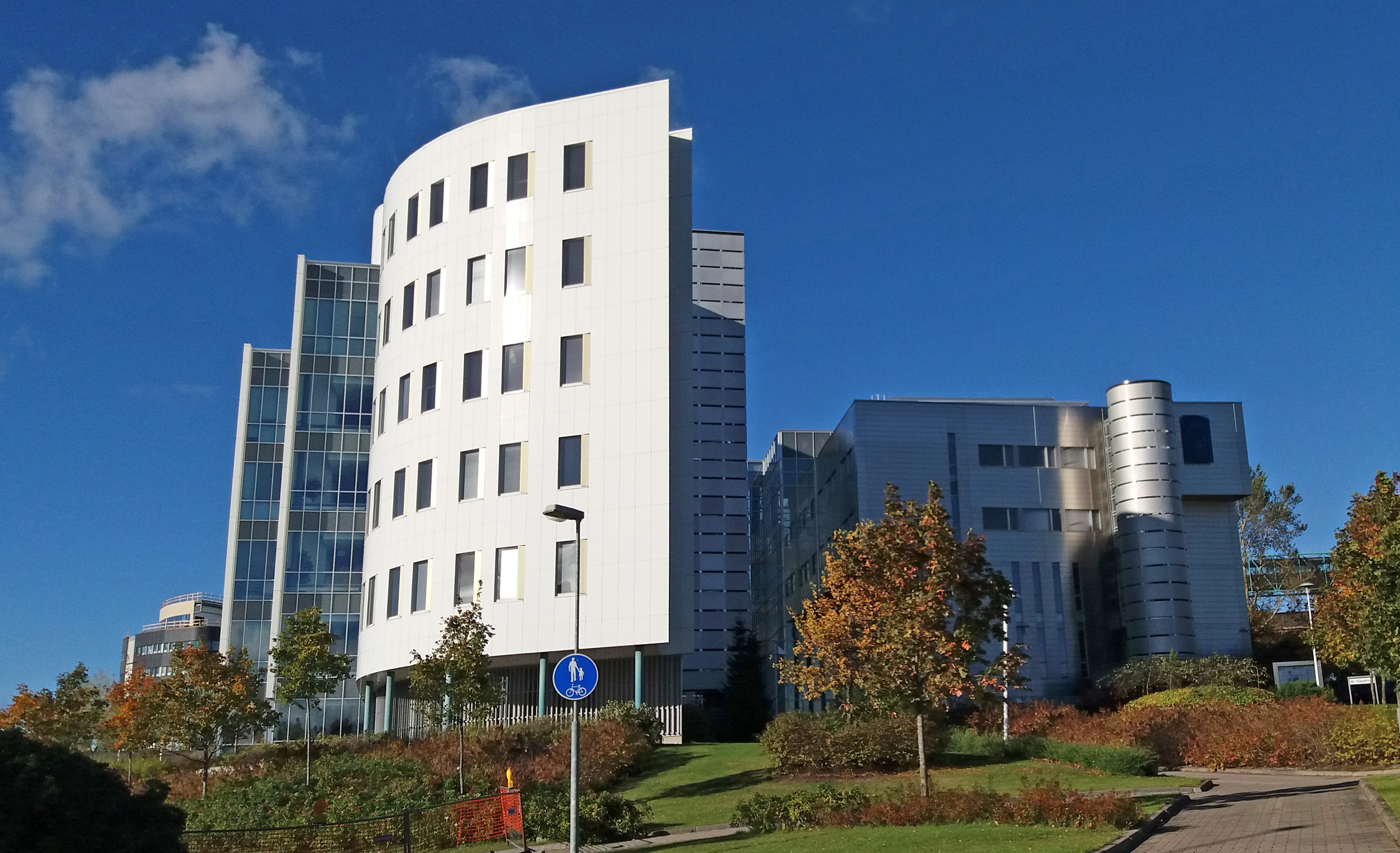
Tampere University in Kalevanharju

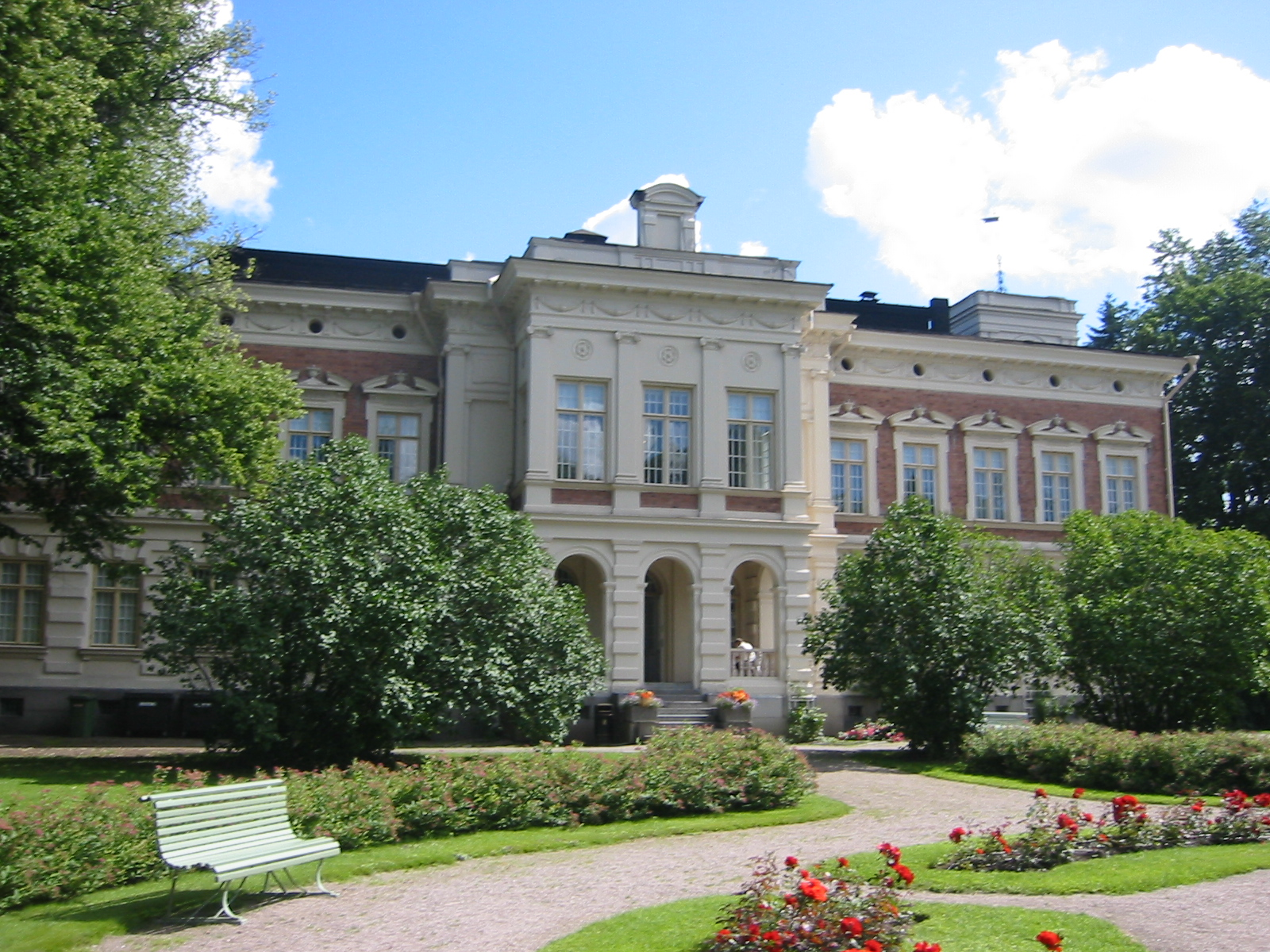
Hatanpää Manor

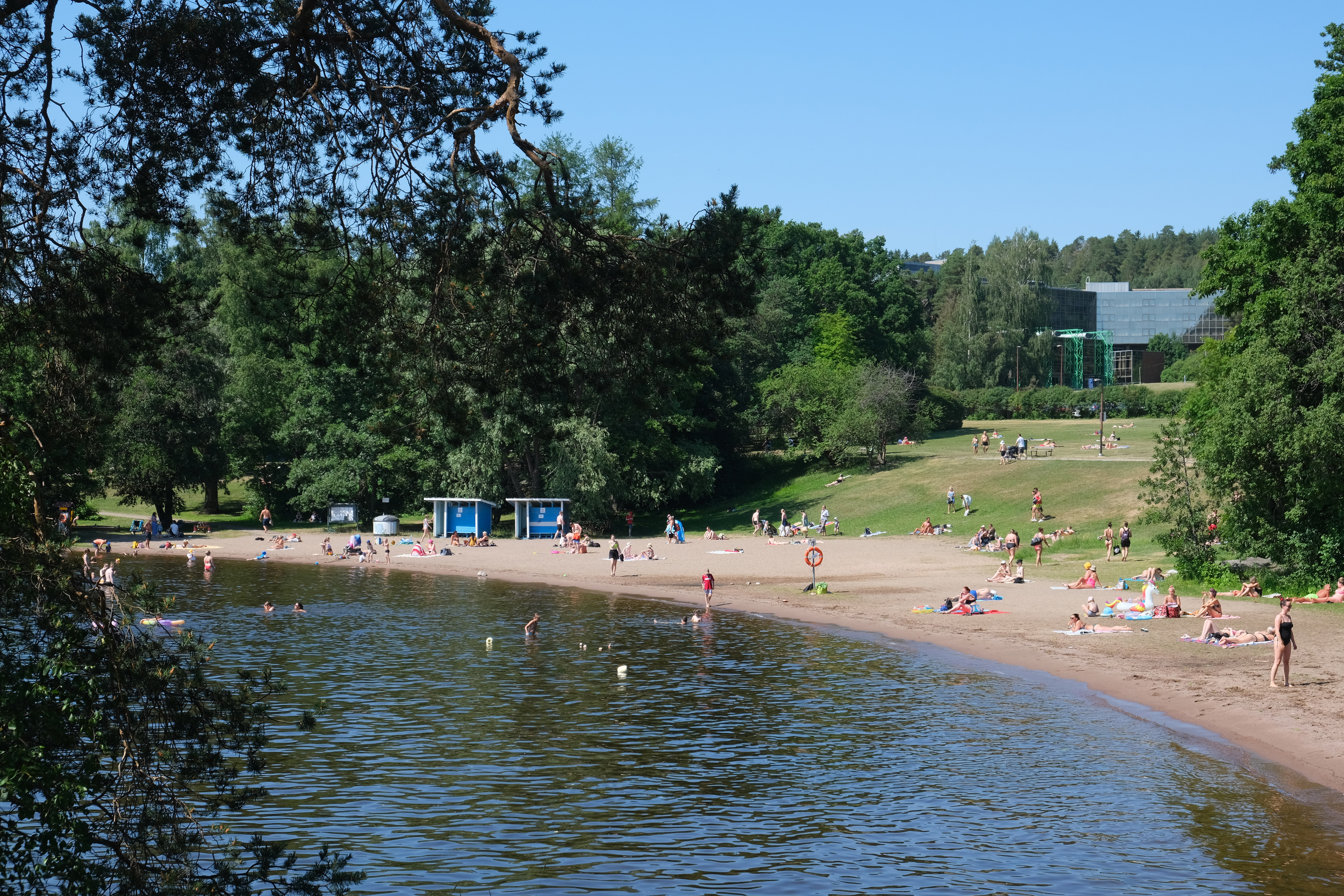
Rosendahl Beach in Pyynikki

== See also ==
- Hämeenkatu
- Iides
- Sampo
