= Timu =

Timu may refer to:

- John Timu (American football) (born 1992), American football linebacker
- John Timu (rugby) (born 1969), former rugby footballer
- a ruler of the Northern state of Gonja, Ghana from 1983 to 1987
- Timu language

== See also ==
- Temu (disambiguation)
