= Amuri, Tampere =

District of Tampere, Finland

Coordinates: 61°30.0′N 023°44.7′E

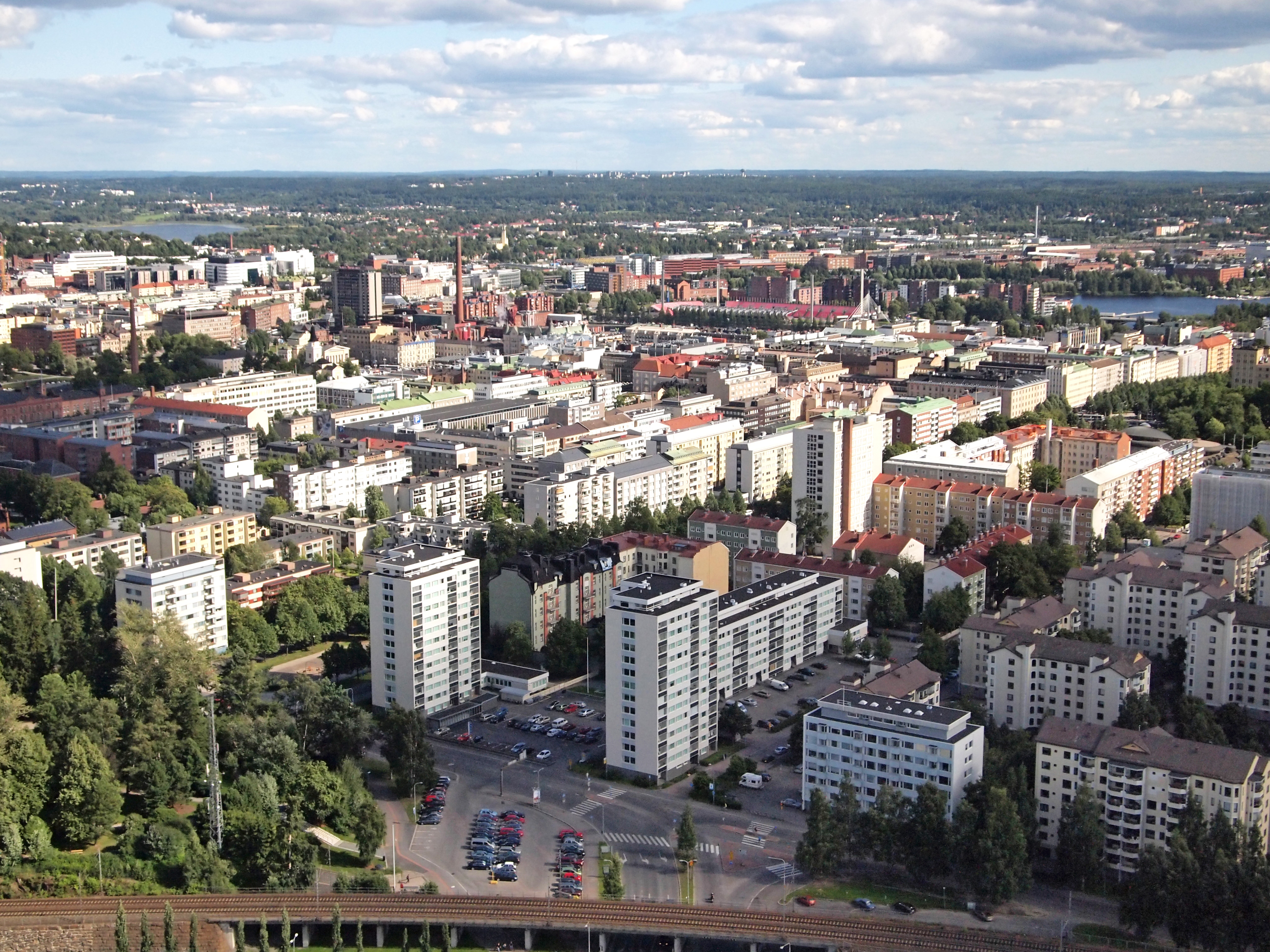
An aerial view of the Amuri district.

Amuri is a district in the city of Tampere, Finland.

Starting from the 19th century, Amuri was originally mainly a residence area for the working class. It consisted of blocks of wooden houses built together, which were replaced by low-rise apartment buildings in the 1970s and 1980s. The worker apartments in Amuri typically had shared kitchens, with two or four families sharing a kitchen together. One block has been preserved as a museum. Amuri also has a disused train traffic stop.

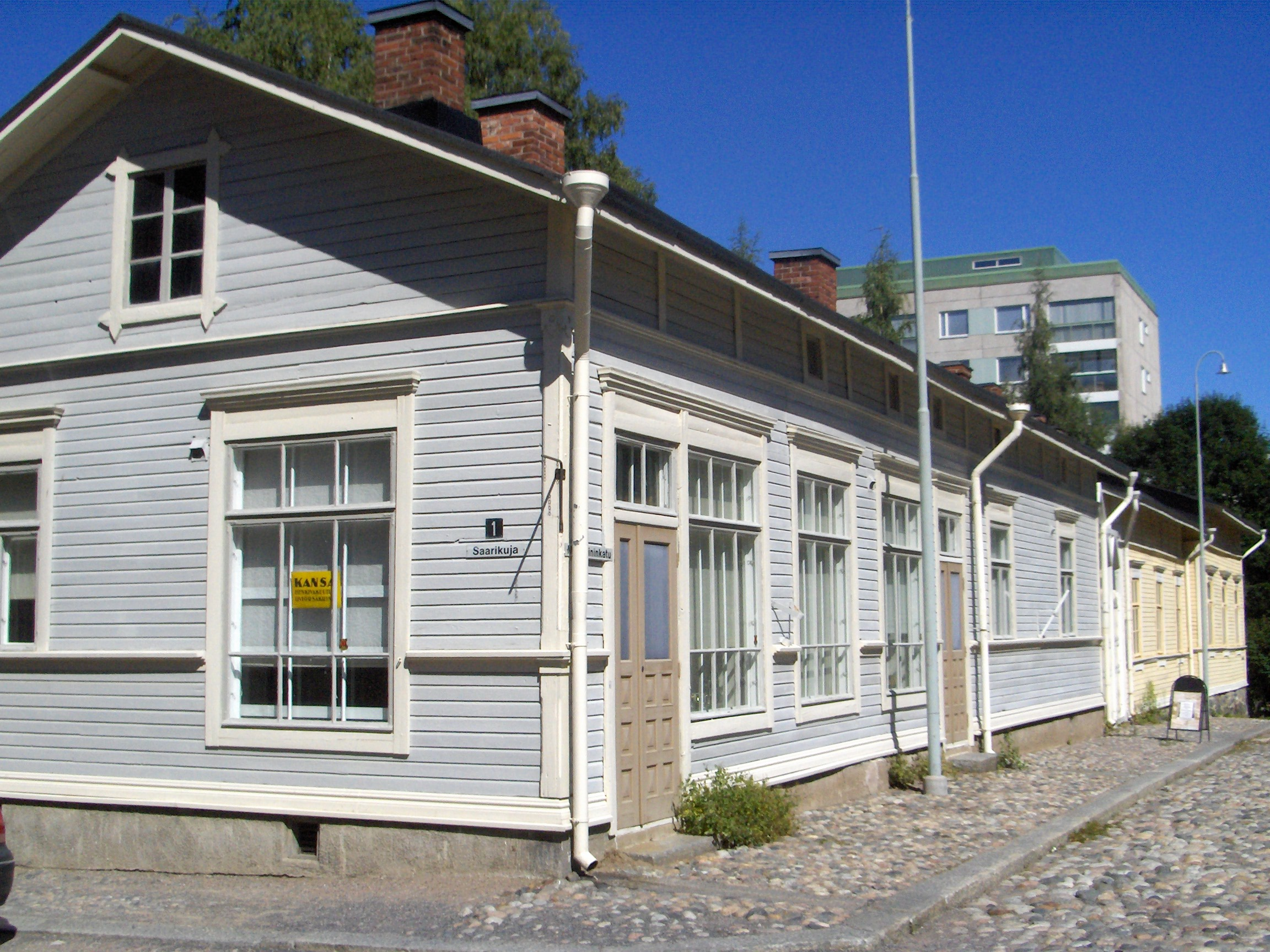
The Amuri worker residence block.

Amuri stretches from Hämeenpuisto to Sepänkatu and from Paasikiventie to Pirkankatu. For tourists, there is a lot to see in Amuri: the Metso main library, the Tampere Art Museum, the Tampere Rock Museum and the traditional worker residence block. The amusement park Särkänniemi is located immediately north of Amuri on the shore of the Näsijärvi lake. Places to eat in Amuri include the Metso library café, the old-fashioned Worker Museum café, the Amurin Helmi restaurant, or the amusement centre Hepokatti. In Amuri there is an international school called FISTA, the Finnish International School of Tampere.
