= Teemu Virtanen =

Finnish ice hockey player

- Born: January 9, 1990 (age 35); Urjala, Finland
- Height: 6 ft 1 in (185 cm)
- Weight: 203 lb (92 kg; 14 st 7 lb)
- Position: Defence
- Shoots: Right
- SM-liiga team: Ilves
- Playing career: 2011–present

Teemu Virtanen (born January 9, 1990) is a Finnish professional ice hockey player who played with Ilves in the SM-liiga during the 2010–11 season.
