= Teemu Metso =

Finnish ice hockey player

- Born: August 23, 1985 (age 39); Oulu, Finland
- Height: 6 ft 0 in (183 cm)
- Weight: 176 lb (80 kg; 12 st 8 lb)
- Position: Defence
- Shoots: Left
- SM-liiga team: Kärpät
- Playing career: 2010–present

Teemu Metso (born August 23, 1985) is a Finnish professional ice hockey player who played with Kärpät in the SM-liiga during the 2010–11 season.
