= Tampere Central Library =

City of Tampere (Finland) central library, also known as 'Metso'

- Tampereen kaupungin pääkirjasto
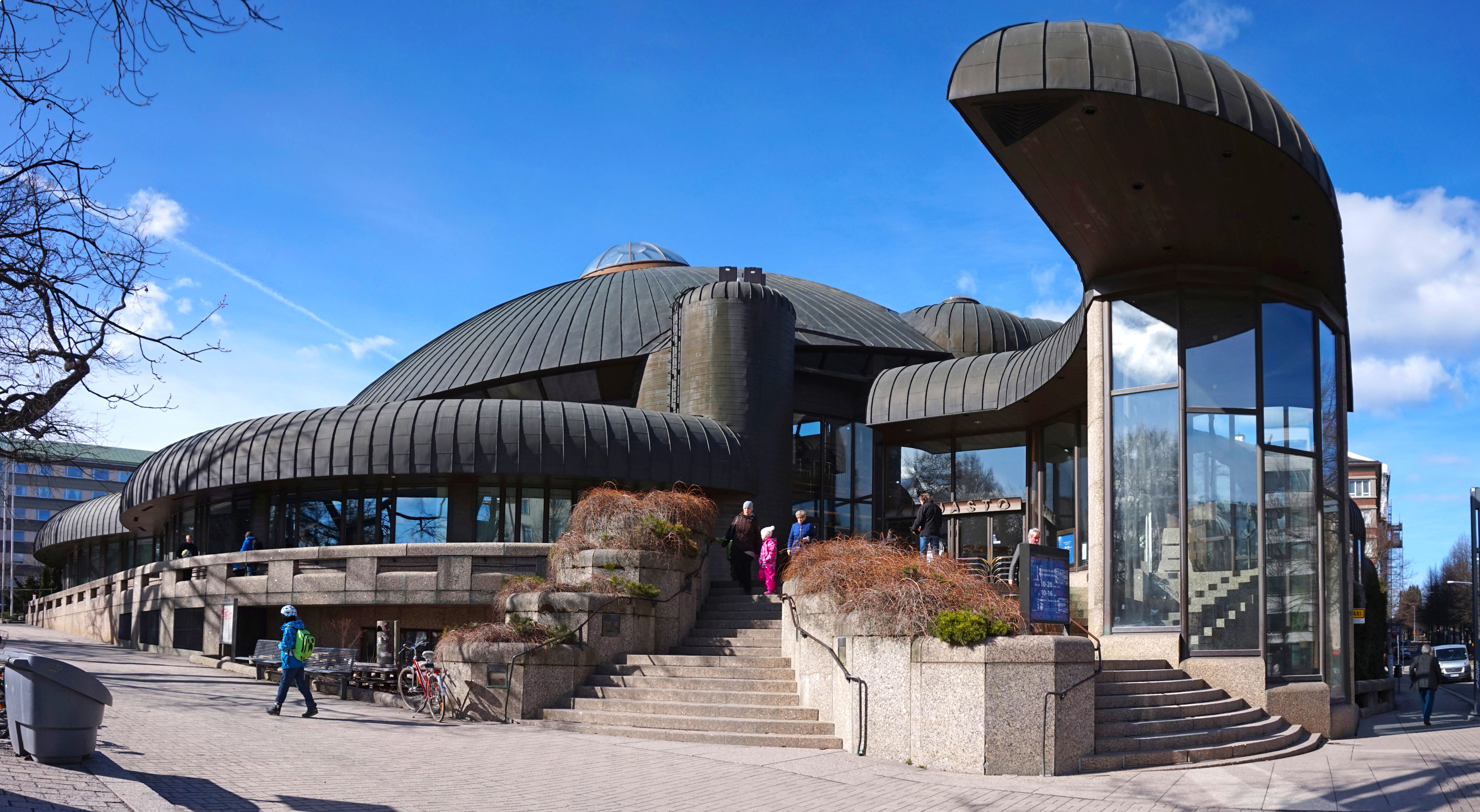
- 61.498207°N 23.750719°E
- Location: Tampere, Finland
- Type: Public library
- Established: 1986
- Architect: Reima Pietilä
- Branch of: Tampere City Library

Tampere Central Library (Finnish: Tampereen kaupungin pääkirjasto) is the main municipal library in Tampere, Finland. It is also known as Metso ('Capercaillie'), due to its resemblance to the bird, when viewed from above. The library is located along the Hämeenpuisto boulevard in the city centre.

== Facilities ==
In addition to the main lending collection, the library houses a reference section and information service, children's and young adults' sections, newspaper reading room, music section as well as a small performance stage. There are also meeting, project work and exhibition spaces, public computer terminals, as well as a cafeteria, Cafe Metso. The facilities are laid out over three floors.

For a quarter of a century, the building was also home to the city's Moomin Museum, until its move to new premises in 2012.

== Building ==
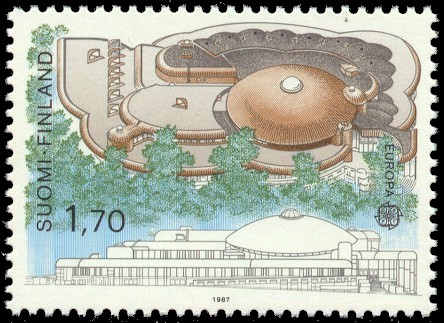
The library featured on a 1987 Finnish postage stamp

The library was designed by architects Reima and Raili Pietilä in the organic architecture style. The design contest was held in 1978, with the Pietiläs' proposal Soidinmenot ('Lek mating') winning by unanimous decision. Inspired by the architects' visit to Ireland during the initial ideas phase, their design language was influenced by Celtic patterns, animal shapes and glacial formations.

The building exterior is made of granite, wiborgite, copper and glass.

Construction began in 1983, and the library opened to the public in August 1986.

A comprehensive renovation was carried out in 2015-2017, at a cost of over €11 million, to refurbish the facilities and bring them better in line with modern requirements.

== Gallery ==
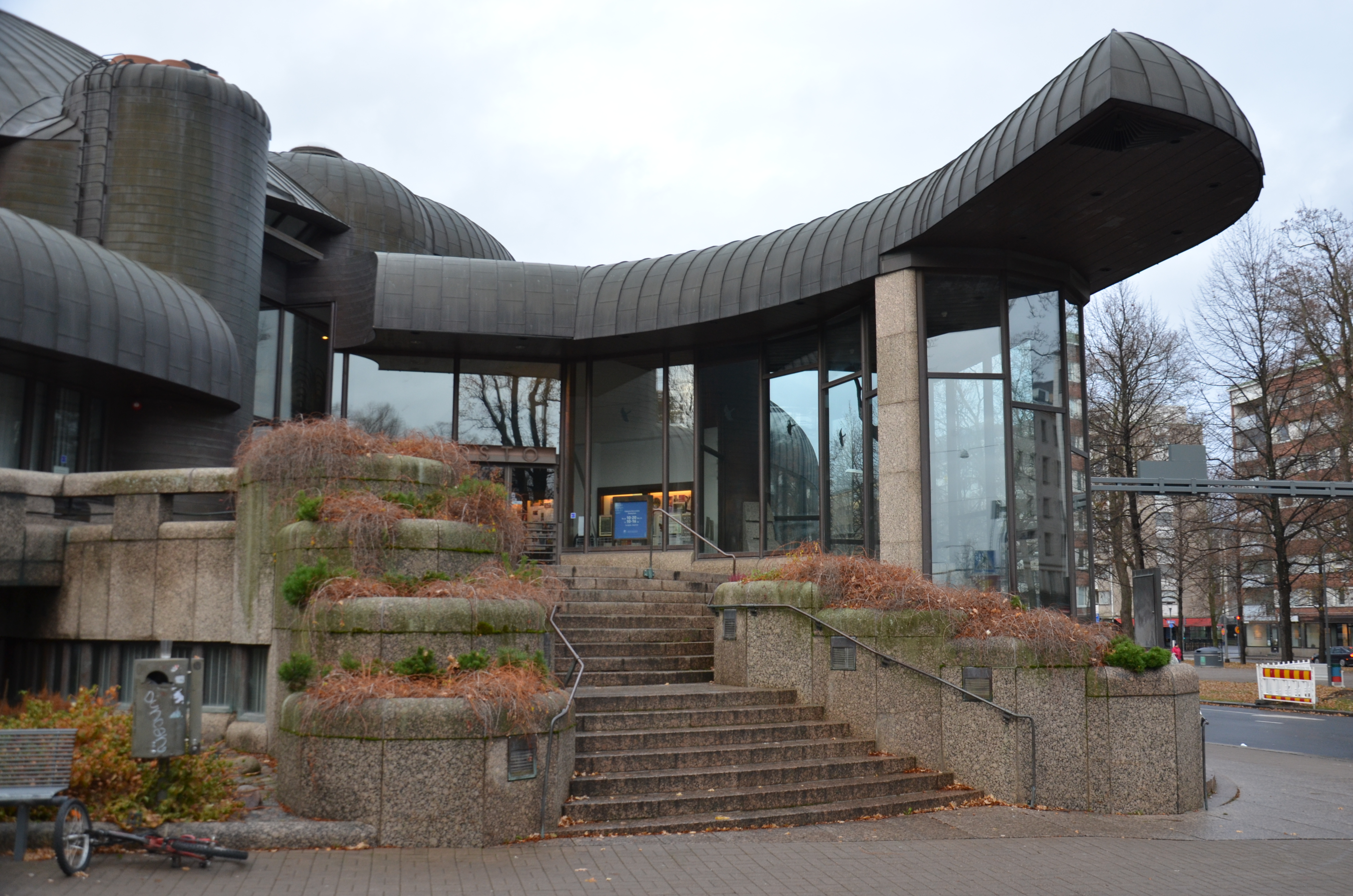
Main entrance

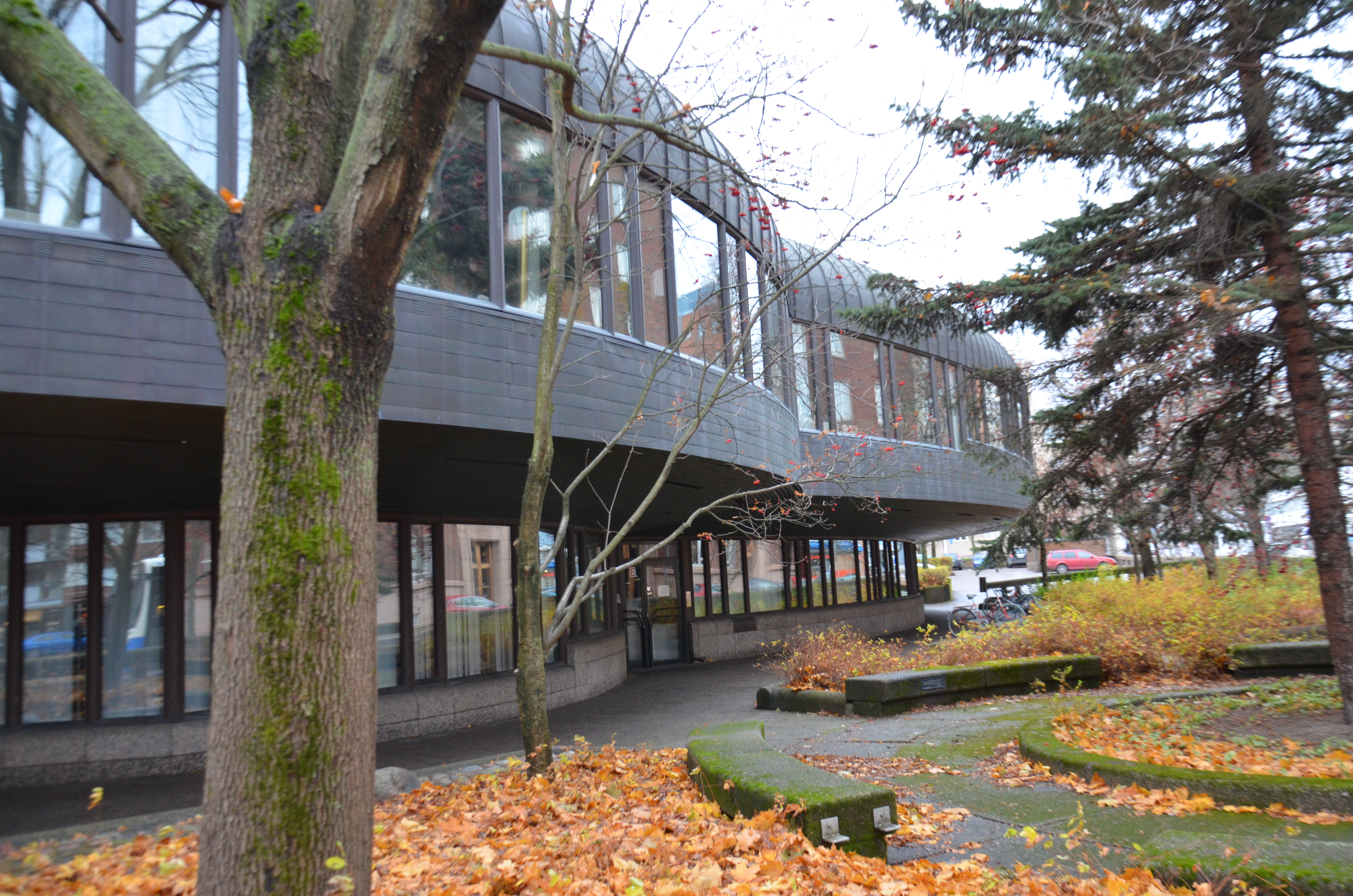
Northern elevation

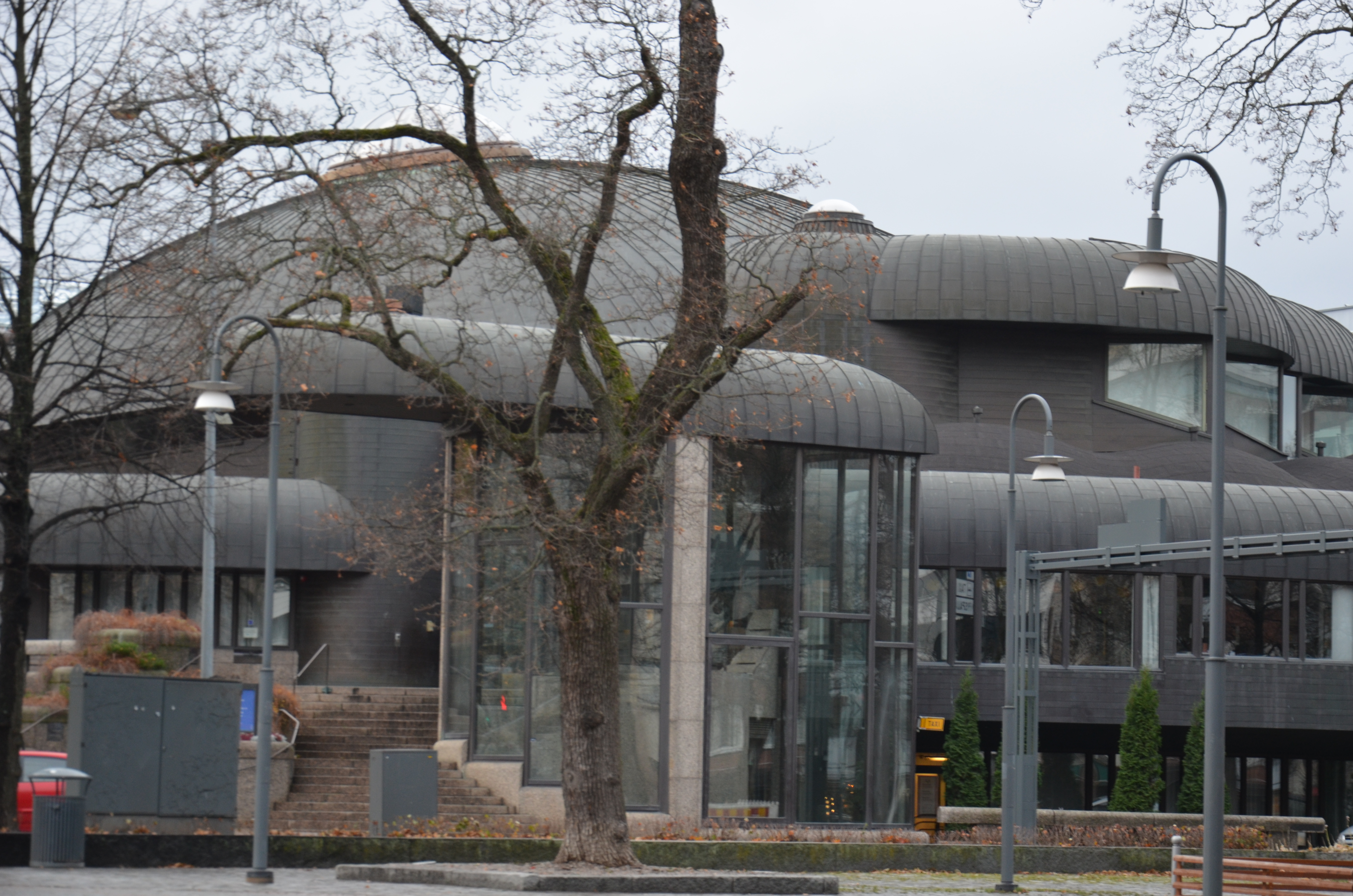
Eastern elevation

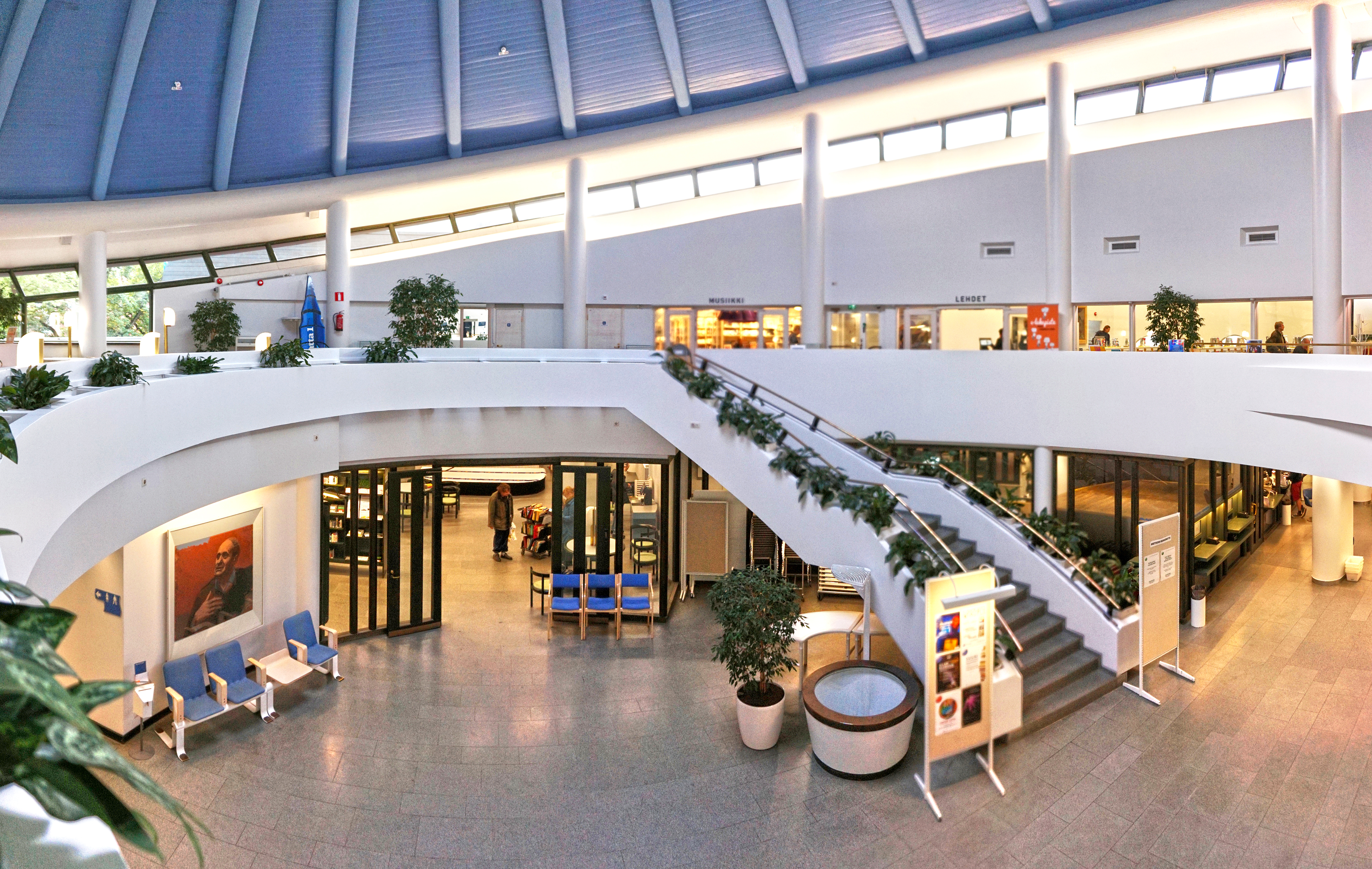
Interior, post-2017 renovation

== See also ==
- Helsinki Central Library Oodi
- List of libraries in Finland
