= Hämeenpuisto =

Park in Tampere, Finland

Coordinates: 61°29′52″N 023°45′07″E

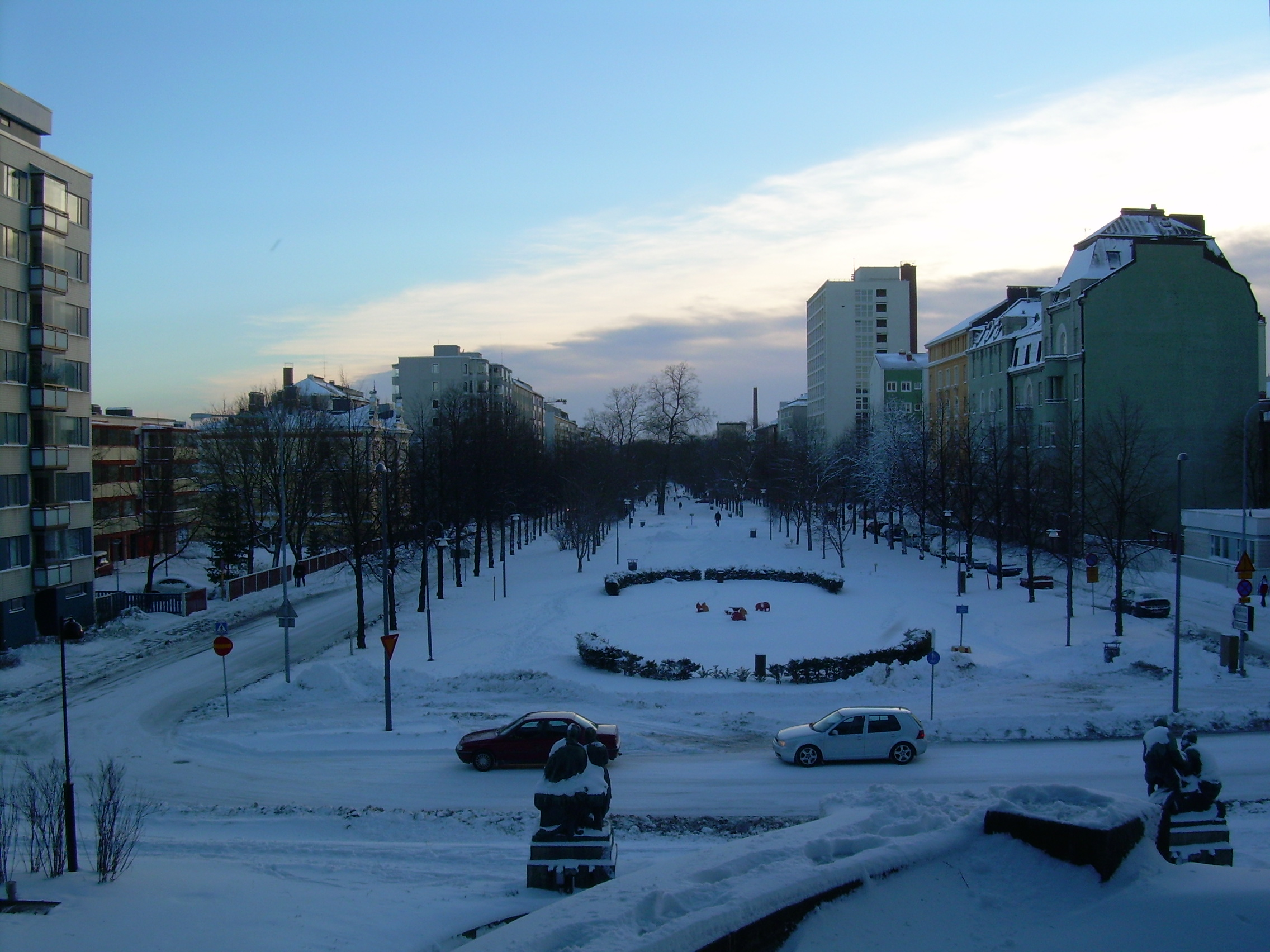
Hämeenpuisto

Hämeenpuisto is a street and public park in Tampere, Finland that is over 1-kilometre (0.62 mi) in length. Its length and central location has earned the park the name "Central Park of Tampere". The park was designed by Carl Ludvig Engel in 1830. Originally the name of the park was Esplanadi, which was changed to Hämeenpuisto in 1936.

The Hämeenpuisto street is a boulevard, consisting of two one-way streets on each side of the park. Hämeenkatu ends in the west at Hämeenpuisto, and one of the cross streets includes Hallituskatu. Along the Hämeenpuisto are the Metso Library, the Alexander Church, the Workers' Hall and the Lenin Museum, among others.

== Notes ==
Media related to Hämeenpuisto Park at Wikimedia Commons
