= Rautaharkko =

City district in Tampere, Finland

Coordinates: 61.47210012635878°N 23.771280443265706°E

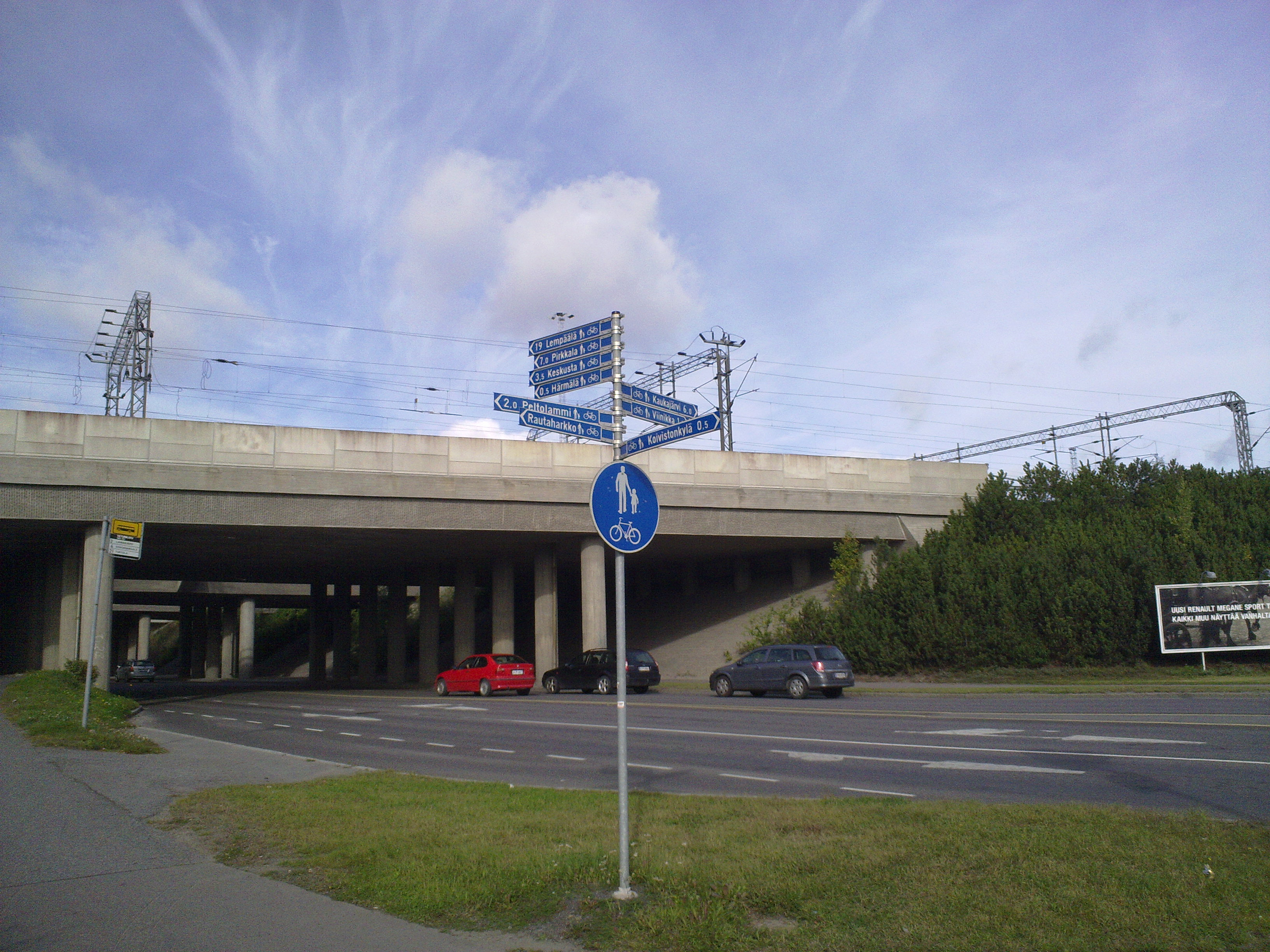
A bus stop in Rautaharkko

Rautaharkko is a district of Tampere, Finland, located about three kilometers from the city center. Rautaharkko is bordered on the west by Rantaperkiö, on the east by Taatala and Nirva, on the south by Lakalaiva and on the north by Vihioja and Hatanpää. As of 31 December 2014, Rautaharkko had 533 inhabitants.

== History and etymology ==
Rautaharkonmäki appears as the border between the divisions of Tammerkoski and Messukylä in 1758. Rautaharkko has been mentioned in church records since the end of the 18th century as the croft of Hatanpää Manor. The area was annexed to the city of Tampere in 1913 when the city bought the manor. The name Rautaharkko (lit. "iron bar") is probably based on the name Rautaorko, which has meant an iron-rich recess in the soil, or a place from which Finnish ores have been raised. The word "orko" was common in medieval village names, but rare in the place names of Satakunta and Tavastia. The transformation of the orko word into an ingot has been shown in 17th century documents in the Vuoksi region of South Karelia. It is possible that at about the same time the name "Rautaorko" has changed to Rautaharkko. When iron is an old Germanic loanword and the disappearance of the word orko from the Finnish language began hundreds of years ago, the roots of the name Rautaharkko can go back as far as a thousand years (cf. Ristinarkku). Rautaharkko's first town plan was completed in 1948. The Muuntajankatu street is named after the large power substation located just south of the district.
