= Vuohenoja =

District of Tampere, Finland

Coordinates: 61°29′10″N 23°49′37″E

Palvaanniemi seen from across Iidesjärvi

Vuohenoja is a district of Tampere, Finland. It lies on the eastern shore of Iidesjärvi. It borders the districts of Järvensivu, Kalevanrinne, and Hakametsä to the north, Aakkula and Messukylä to the east, Muotiala and Turtola to the south, and Järvensivu to the west. The population of Vuohenoja was 614 in 2025.

In 1913, Vuohenoja was ceded to Tampere, having formerly been part of the Hatanpää Manor estate. The district is essentially divided into four parts by Messukyläntie and Hervannan valtaväylä, two major roads running through the district. The southwestern corner Palvaanniemi consists primarily of terraced houses and small apartment buildings, the southeast mainly consists of detached houses and terraced houses. The northeast and northwest mainly consist of detached houses and semi-detached houses.

The district is named after the Vuohenoja stream, which runs through it.
