= Iides =

District in the city of Tampere, Finland

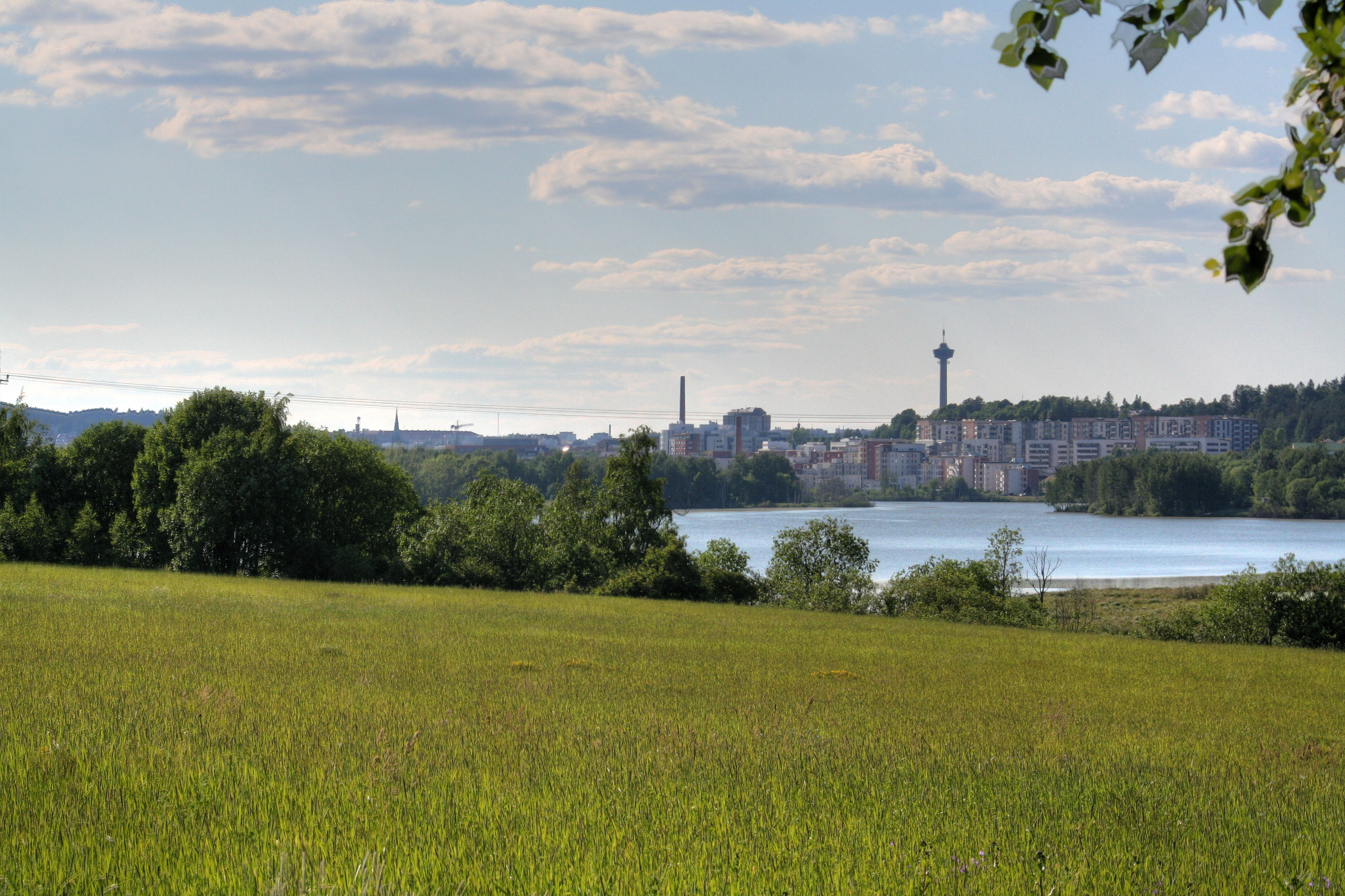
Lake Iides, the most well-known sight of the Iides district.

Iides is one of the main districts in the city center of Tampere in Pirkanmaa, Finland. The so-called planning area of Iides includes the statistical areas of Viinikka, Nekala, Vihioja, Jokipohja and Muotiala.

The district is named after Tampere's most famous bird lake, Lake Iides (Iidesjärvi), located in the middle of the area. Many of the arable land in the area is former land belonging to Hatanpää Manor.

== See also ==
- Keskusta
- Sampo
