= Ruotula =

District of Tampere, Finland

Coordinates: 61°30′09″N 23°50′35″E

Ruotula is a district of Tampere, Finland. It borders the districts of Niihama and Kauppi to the north and west, Takahuhti to the east, Takahuhti and Huikas to the south, and Kissanmaa and Uusikylä to the west. The population of Ruotula was 1,396 in 2025.

The district was part of the municipality of Messukylä, and was annexed by Tampere in 1947. After the Second World War, Ruotula was planned as a district for evacuees and returning war veterans.
