= Kissanmaa =

District of the city of Tampere, Finland

Coordinates: 61°30′02.3″N 23°49′03.1″E

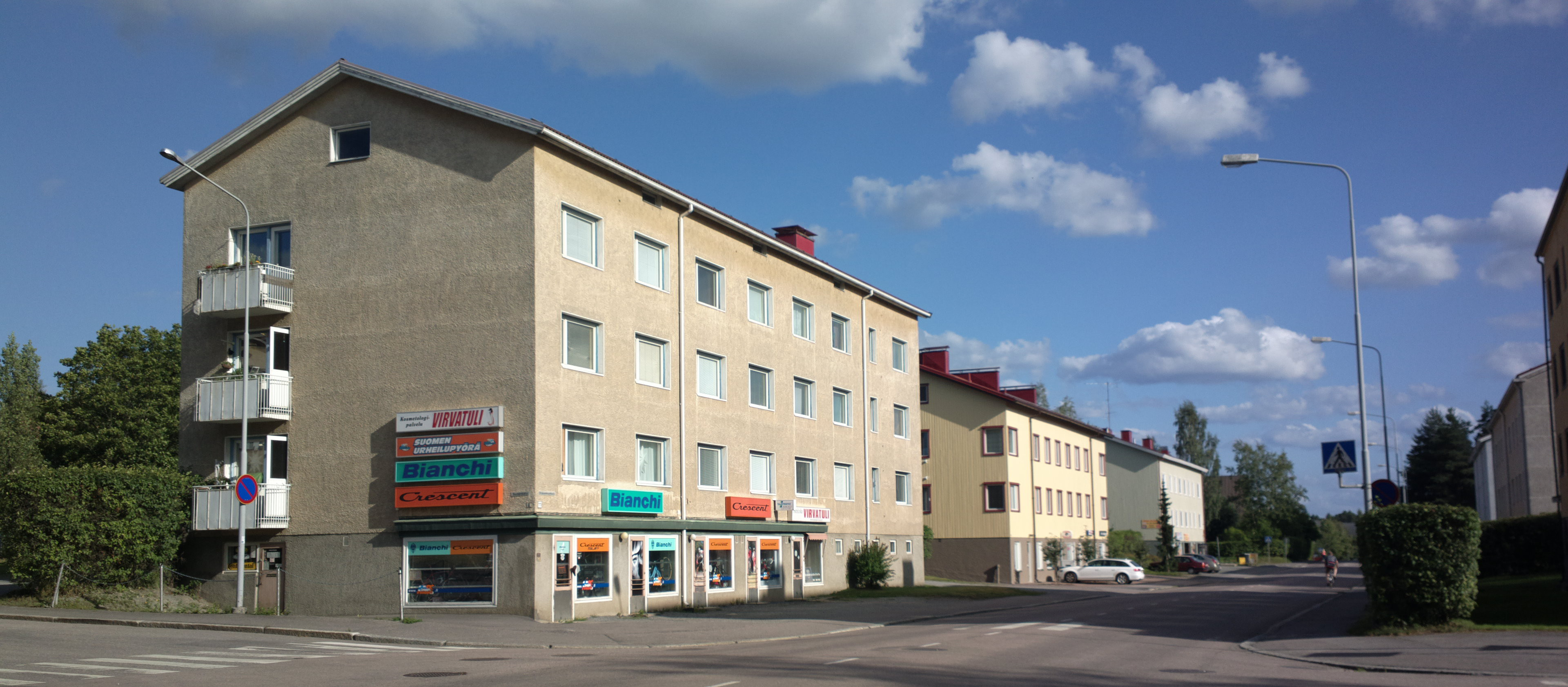
Apartment buildings at the Kissanmaankatu street

Kissanmaa is a district in the eastern part of Tampere, Finland, along the Teiskontie street. It belongs to the subdivision of Sampo, and it is located 3 kilometers from the city center. Kissanmaa is surrounded by Ruotula and Uusikylä in the east, Hakametsä in the south, Kaleva in the west and Kauppi in the north. Most of the residential houses are detached houses, but there are also apartment buildings of different sizes in the western part of the area. The area is best known for Finland's first ice rink, Tampere Ice Stadium, and training hall, completed in 1965. The first town plan of Kissanmaa was established in 1958.

== Etymology ==
The name Kissanmaa (literally the "land of cat") first appeared in 1913, when the area was annexed to Tampere in connection with the Hatanpää land trade. In Kissanmaa, reference was made to a narrow forest area that extended from Lake Näsijärvi to Lake Iides. The name Kissanmaa also appeared in the 1916-17 address map. At that time, lands were named after animals. Large estates were named after large animals, while small and insignificant areas were named after small animals. The area's name may also be due to the fact that lynx were still found in the area in the late 19th century. The name may also be based on the estate called Kissankorpi, which appeared on a map made by Hugo Hackstedt in 1869 of the premises of the Hatanpää Manor. However, many of the street names in Kissanmaa are related to animals or former hunting (for example, Sudenkatu and Vasamakatu).

== Services ==
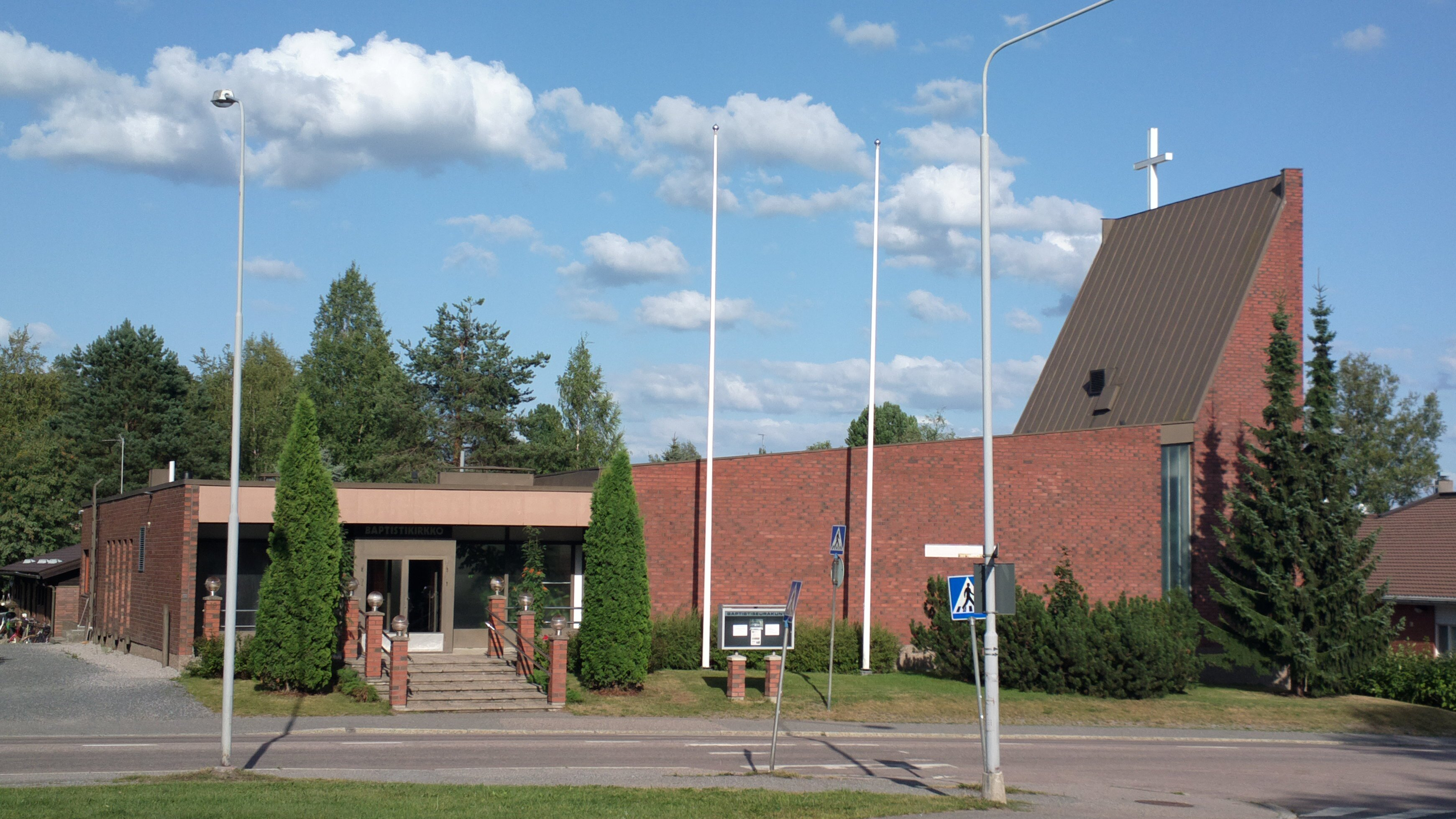
Baptist church of Tampere in Kissanmaa

The area has a K-Market, a pizzeria, a parish house, several barber shops, as well as the offices of the Tappara Finnish Championship League team, the junior association and supporters, Tampere Ice Rink, Tampere Training Ice Rink, driving school and kindergarten. Previously, there was also a post office kiosk and Kissankulma pub in the Kissanmaa Square. Tampere Arena, Prisma and Tampere University Hospital are located on the border of Kissanmaa, and the apartments for employees are located at the southern end of Kissanmaa. The Kissanmaa Family Support Center is also opposite the hospital.

Among the educational institutions on the border of the area is Tampere University of Applied Sciences and primary school. Kissanmaa Primary School cooperates with Sampo Secondary School. There are also dormitories in Kissanmaa.
