= Huikas =

District of Tampere, Finland

Coordinates: 61°29′48″N 23°50′20″E

Huikas is a district of Tampere, Finland. It borders the districts of Ruotula to the north and west, Takahuhti to the east, Hakametsä and Ristinarkku to the south, and Uusikylä to the west. The population of Huikas was 1,175 in 2025.

The district was part of the municipality of Messukylä, and was annexed by Tampere in 1947.
