= Uusikylä, Tampere =

District of Tampere, Finland

Coordinates: 61°29′49″N 23°49′45″E

Uusikylä

Uusikylä is a district of Tampere, Finland. It borders the districts of Kissanmaa to the north and west, Ruotula and Huikas to the east and Hakametsä to the south. The population of Uusikylä was 1,279 in 2025.

The district was part of the municipality of Messukylä, and was annexed by Tampere in 1947. Housing started being built in the area in the early 20th century, following the construction of a road connecting Takahuhti with Tampere city centre.
