= List of ice hockey arenas in Finland =

The following list is a list of list of Finnish ice hockey arenas by capacity. Only those arenas that host ice hockey games regularly with paid admission and a capacity over 6,000 are included.

== Finnish ice hockey arenas by capacity ==
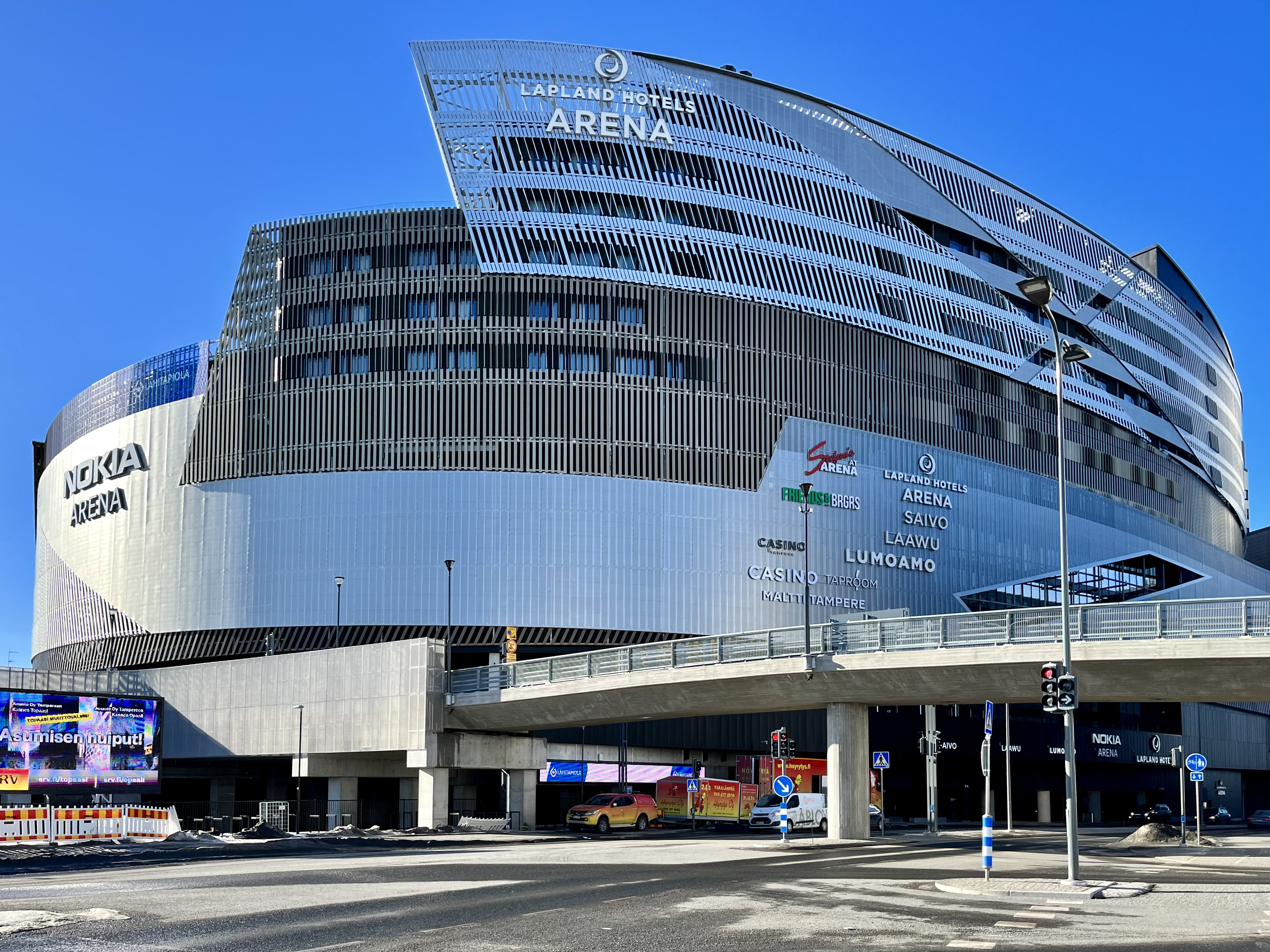
Nokia Areena, Tampere

Rank	Arena	Ice hockey capacity	City	Region	Home team(s) (hockey only)
1	Veikkaus Arena	13,349	Helsinki	Uusimaa	Jokerit
2	Nokia Arena	12,700	Tampere	Pirkanmaa	Tappara, Ilves
3	Gatorade Center	11,820	Turku	Varsinais-Suomi	HC TPS
4	Helsingin jäähalli	8,200	Helsinki	Uusimaa	HIFK Hockey
5	Tampere Ice Stadium	7,300	Tampere	Pirkanmaa	KOOVEE
6	Espoo Metro Areena	6,982	Espoo	Uusimaa	Kiekko-Espoo
7	Oulun Energia Areena	6,400	Oulu	Pohjois-Pohjanmaa	Kärpät
8	Isomäki Ice Hall	6,350	Pori	Satakunta	Ässät
