= Aakkula =

City district in Tampere, Finland

Coordinates: 61.486466°N 23.8335779°E

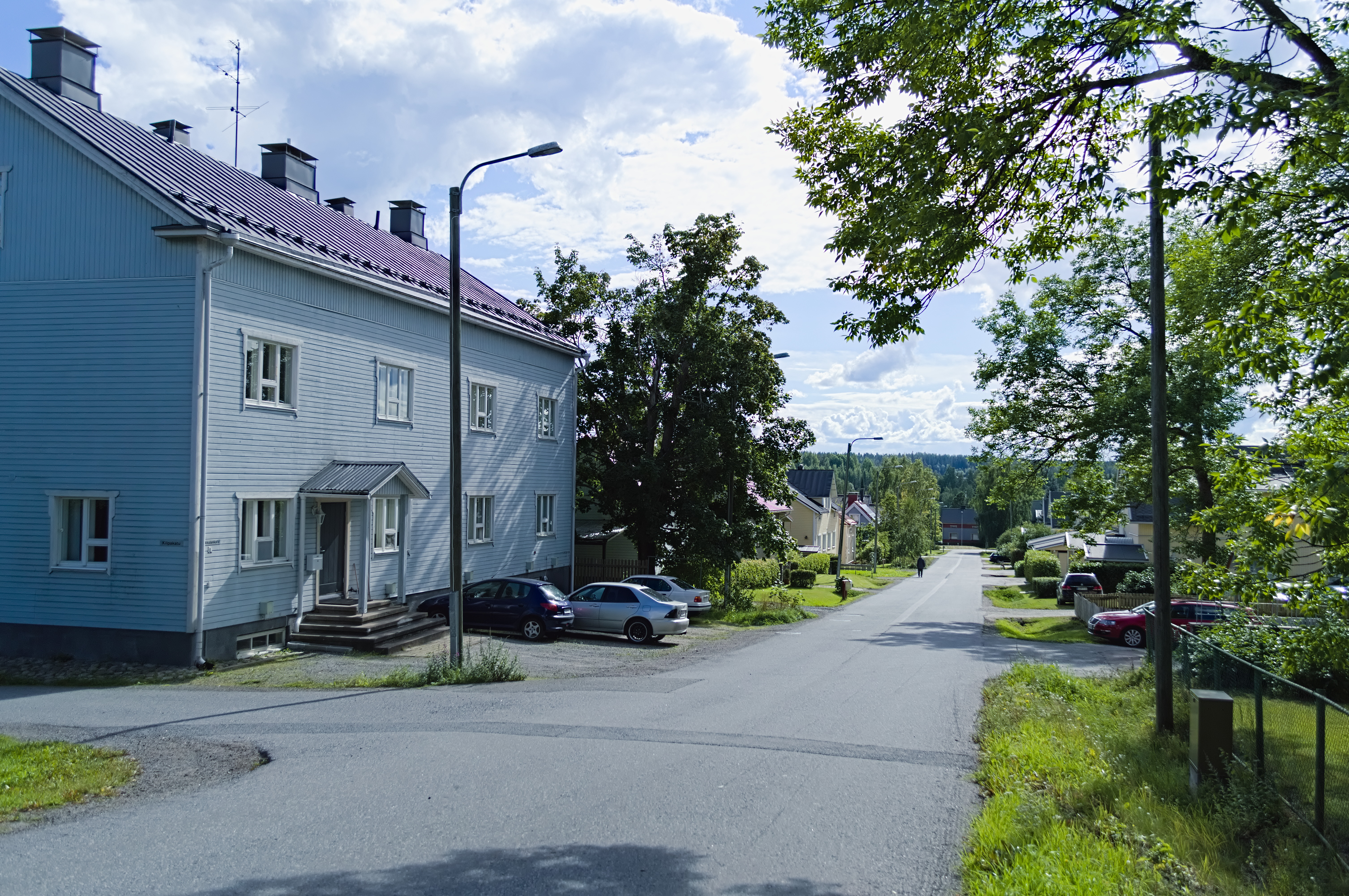
Aakkula along the Aakkulankatu street

Aakkula is a smaller district in Tampere, Finland, located about four kilometers from its city center. Aakkula is bordered on the west by Vuohenoja, on the east by Viiala, on the south by Turtola and on the north by Messukylä. In 2012, Aakkula had 465 inhabitants.

The Aakkula house, which belonged to the village of Messukylä, was already mentioned in the 1540 land register. The house is located along the current Aakkulankatu street and may have been named after its owner in 1566–1618 by Aukusti Erkinpoja. The Aakkula house became the office building of the Messukylä chaplain in 1678. In 1928, the church council of the Messukylä parish decided to sell the lands of Aakkula as detached houses and agricultural estates. The first estates were sold from the area in 1931 and the last in 1939. At the beginning of the Messukylä municipal association at the beginning of 1947, the area moved to the city of Tampere and its town plan was approved in the same year.
