= Takra =

Type of tractor

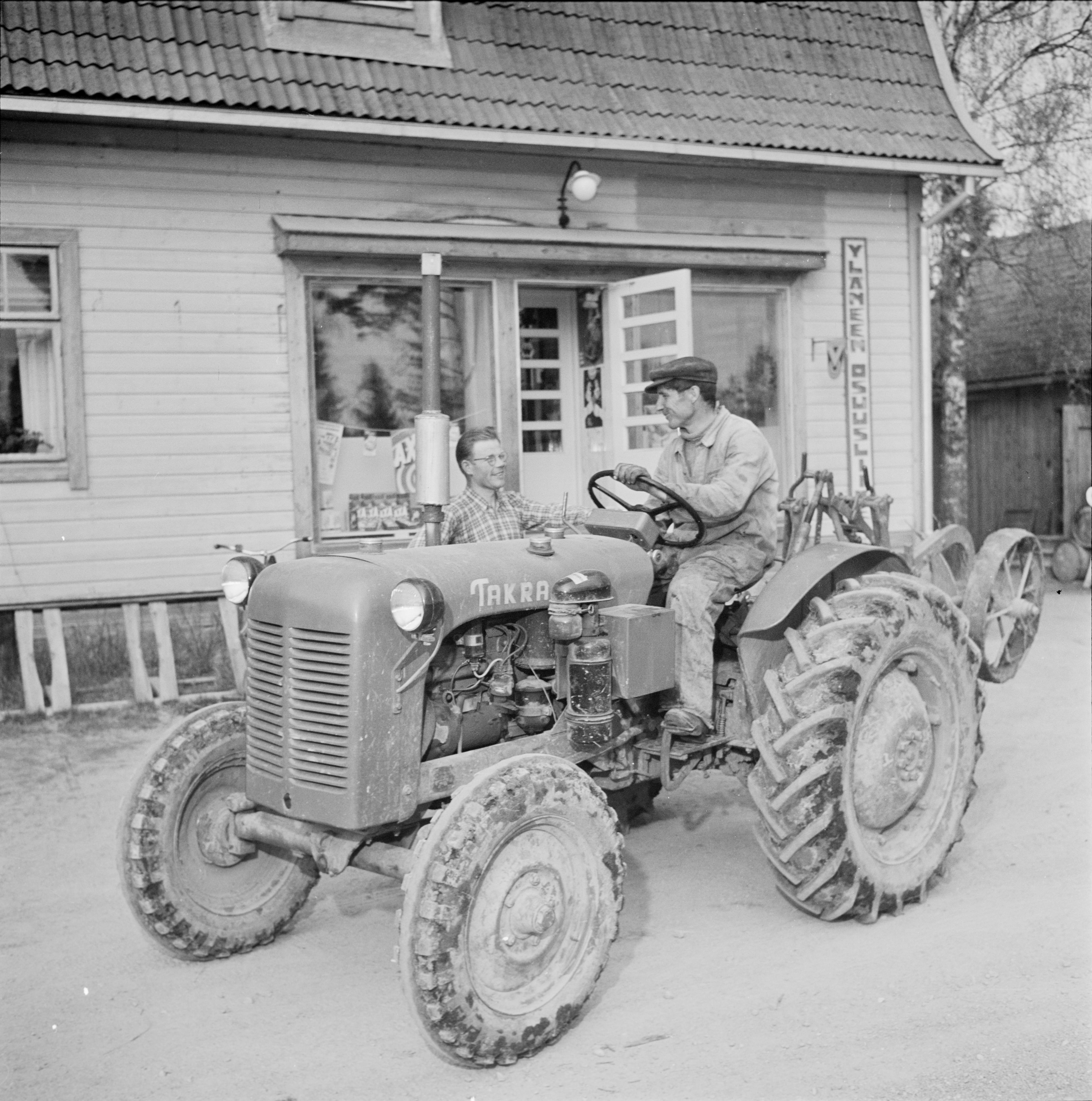
- Production: 1949–1954

The Takra was a Finnish tractor model. 880 units were produced in the period 1949–1954. The tractor was technically capable but considered overpriced taking into account its characteristics.

== Background ==
The factory that manufactured the Takra was located in Nekala, Tampere. The company was started as a bus operator but began producing spare parts for vehicles during World War II. After the war the company produced mechanical and belt conveyors, which were produced for war reparations to Soviet Union. The production was relatively large-scaled; the number of personnel was 300 and turnover 188 million marks in 1948.

== Planning ==
After the war, there was a severe shortage of tractors in Finland, and in 1946 the company made the decision to start tractor production. At the beginning of 1947 the Technical Manager of the company Aulis A. Lumme was assigned to make plans for a tractor. The first prototype was ready in spring 1948 and a year later it was exhibited in the 40th anniversary celebration of Kangasala Farmers' Society. The event was also reported on Helsingin Sanomat, the main newspaper of Finland.

== Production ==
The first sample series of six units was produced in June 1949 and one of them was sent for testing to the State Agricultural Machinery Research Institute (Vakola). Several improvements were made after the feedback.

The sales representation was granted to Suomen Maanviljelijäin Kauppa Oy (SMK), which also sold McCormick tractors. In June 1950 Takra was on display in Tampere fair at SMK stand, where it got a lot of visibility – the number of visitors during the fair was 115 000. After this Takra was shown in Savo fair in Varkaus.

Serial production was started in 1950 and the company reported producing over 100 units. However, due to strikes in metal industry, just 30 tractors were produced by the following February. This led to doubts on Takra's production capabilities, and the company management tried to convince the public by telling that the production capacity will be increased as soon as the war reparations will be paid off. Eventually, the price of Takra tractors had climbed higher than estimated and it was clearly more expensive than its foreign competitors.

The production volume in 1951 was reportedly 100 tractors, the following year's production is estimated to be 200. The only bottleneck at this stage were the raw material constraints. The company also designed and produced agricultural machinery compatible with Takras. At the same time there was a critical shortage of tractors in Finland; the estimated gap was 10 000–15 000 tractors and the domestic production was hardly worth mentioning. Therefore, the government was under pressure to remove the import restrictions. At the end of 1951 the tractor importing was released for a few months, during which a lot of tractors of various makes were quickly transported into the country.

Construction of a new Takra factory was started in spring 1953 and the production was moved into the new facilities at late winter 1954. By then the production rate had reached already one tractor per day and in the new facilities it went up to eight tractors per week. It seemed realistic to increase the annual volume up to level of 500–600 tractors; a larger number was estimated reachable by help of subcontractors. The production costs were hoped to be decreased as and when the volumes increased.

However, the artificially overvalued rate of the Finnish mark and price dumping of the foreign tractors created problems. For example, Fordson Major cost about 500 000 marks in Sweden whereas the price in Finland was just 390 000 marks. The new Takra factory did not stay operative very long, until the company owner, Väinö Paunu, decided to discontinue the production. The factory was sold to the city of Tampere.

Officially the Takra tractor production totalled 880 pieces. According to the documents of the authorities the number was about hundred units smaller. The last Takras were sold from SMK's stock in 1955.

== Technical data and characteristics ==
The power source is Waukesha paraffin engine with an output of 26 horsepower. The transmission consists four ratios. The tractor is equipped with three-point linkage. The kerb weight is 1 740 kg.

Takra's output corresponded Fordson Major. During Vakola tests it could easily pull with a third gear a spade roller harrow with 25 rollers. When equipped with wheel chains, Takra could pull a two-furrow plough with 14" wings through medium hard soil.

The tractor was evaluated as easy to use and maintain, and structurally and characteristically suitable for general agricultural use. An ideal farm size for Takra were places with about 40 hectares of field and therefore its market potential looked good. Takra was considered suitable also to forestry work.

Takra's stumbling block was its price. In December 1951 a Takra with electrical starter, hydraulic three-point linkage, pulley for stationary use, power take-off and headlights was 665 000 marks; for example Fordson Major cost then just 351 500 marks. On the other hand, Takra was also available without the mentioned accessories, which lowered its price.
