= Koivistonkylä =

City district in Tampere, Finland

Coordinates: 61°28′15.88307″N 23°47′28.88329″E

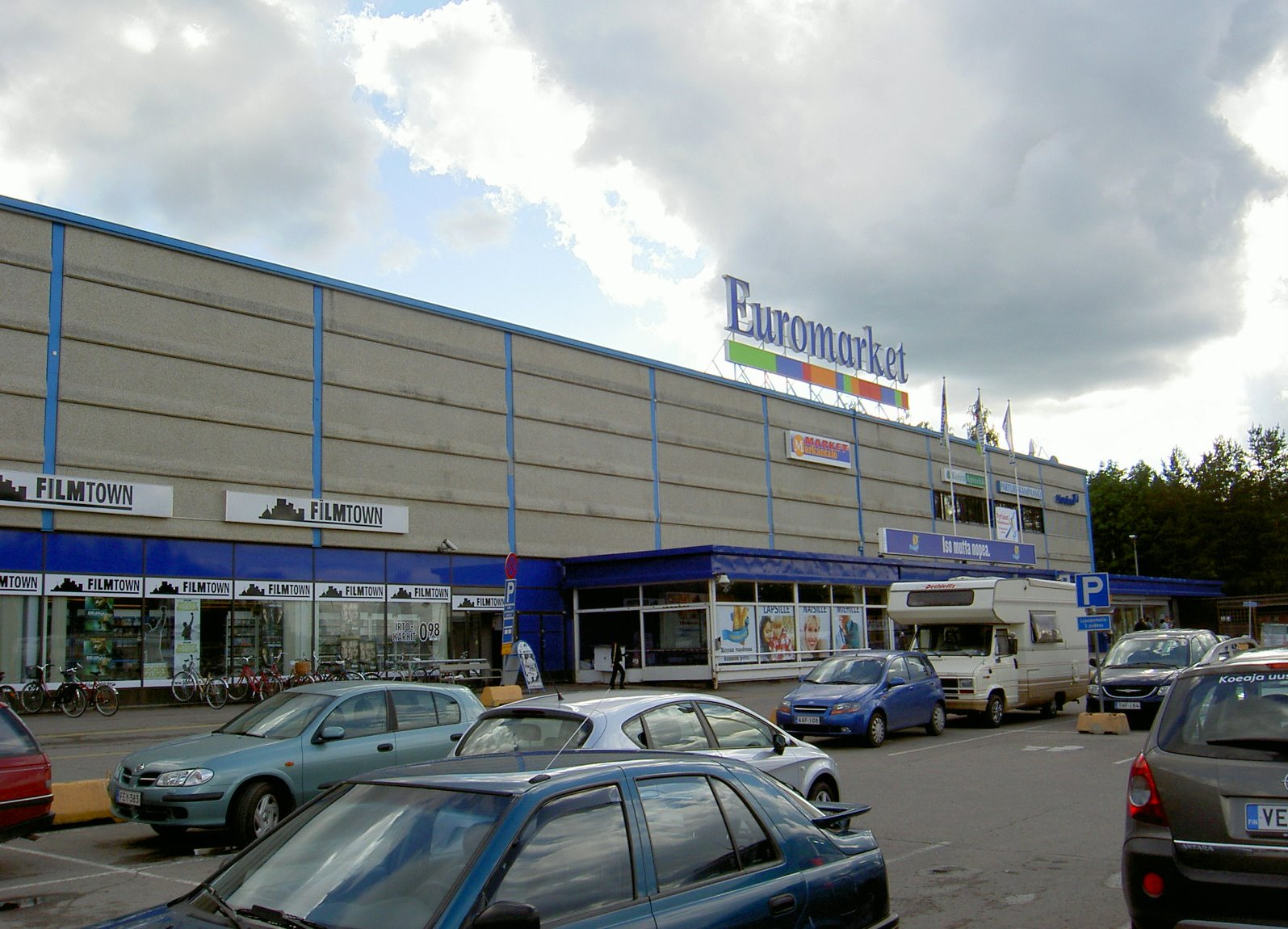
Euromarket (formerly Eka-Market) in Koivistonkylä photographed in 2007. Today it is replaced by the Prisma hypermarket.

Koivistonkylä (also nicknamed Koikkari among the locals) is a district located in the southern part of Tampere, Finland. It borders Nekala in the north, Rautaharkko in the west, Taatala in the south and Veisu in the east. Many ice hockey players from Tampere come from Koivistonkylä, including Raimo Helminen. Koivistonkylä also has its own amateur ice hockey club called Koivistonkylän Chiefs.

Koivistonkylä is named after the Koivisto croft that belonged to the village of Messukylä's church book. A crofter called Aukusti Koivisto redeemed the farm independently in the 1920s. At the same time, lively construction began in the area, and by the mid-1940s, about 400 estates had already been parcel out from it. Koivistonkylä moved to the city of Tampere in the Messukylä municipal association at the beginning of 1947.

In connection with the construction of the motorway of Kulju, the village of Lempäälä, in the mid-1960s, part of Sulkavuori was cut to connect the old Lempääläntie to Koivistontie. The remaining spruce side on the Taatala side was destroyed in the way of Osuusliike Voima's Eka-Market, now Prisma, which was completed in 1977. Koivistonkylä's Eka-Market was Finland's first actual hypermarket. Finland's first self-service Alko store also came to the same building.

== Sources ==
=== Further reading ===
- Essi Maria Lammi: Koivistontien varrelta : Koivistonkylän kaupunginosahistoria. Tampere: Koivistonkylän omakotiyhdistys, Tampereen kaupunki, 2000. ISBN 951-609-133-4. (in Finnish)
