= Vihioja =

City district in Tampere, Finland

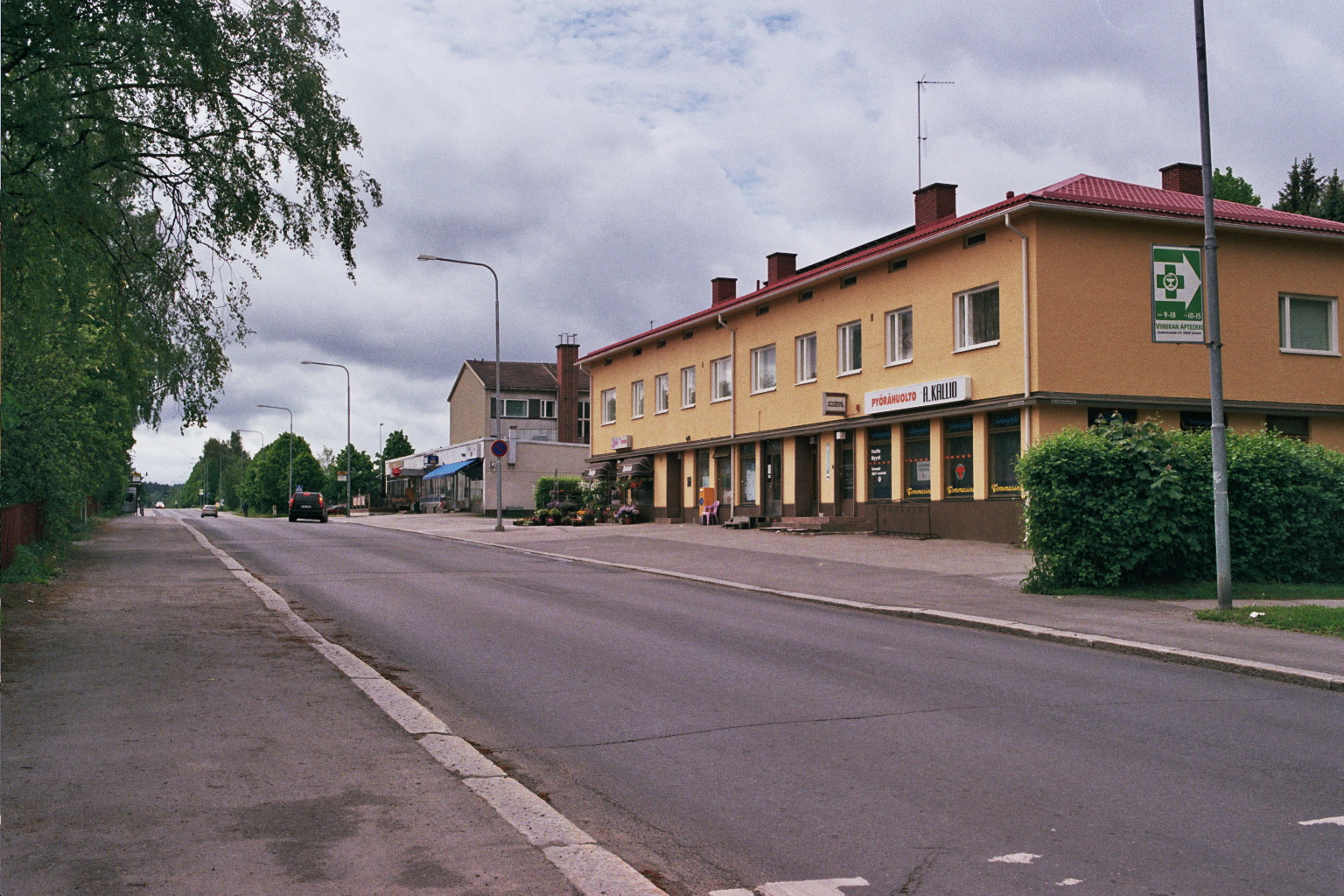
Jokipohjantie street in Vihioja

Vihioja is a district in Tampere, Finland. Together with Nekala and Jokipohja, it forms the larger Nekala subdivision. Vihioja is bordered on the north by Nekala, on the east by Jokipohja, on the south by Koivistonkylä and on the west by Hatanpää.

The unofficial name of the district is based on the Vihioja stream next to it. The stream originates from Lake Houkanjärvi on side of the Kangasala town and flows into Lake Pyhäjärvi's Vihioja Bay. The word vihi means a derivative made of spruce branches of a wild bird's gear. Vihioja has also been a field area along the stream that belonged to Hatanpää Manor. The district, which originally belonged to Messukylä, was zoned in 1939 as an industrial area.
