= Hakametsä =

City district in Tampere, Finland

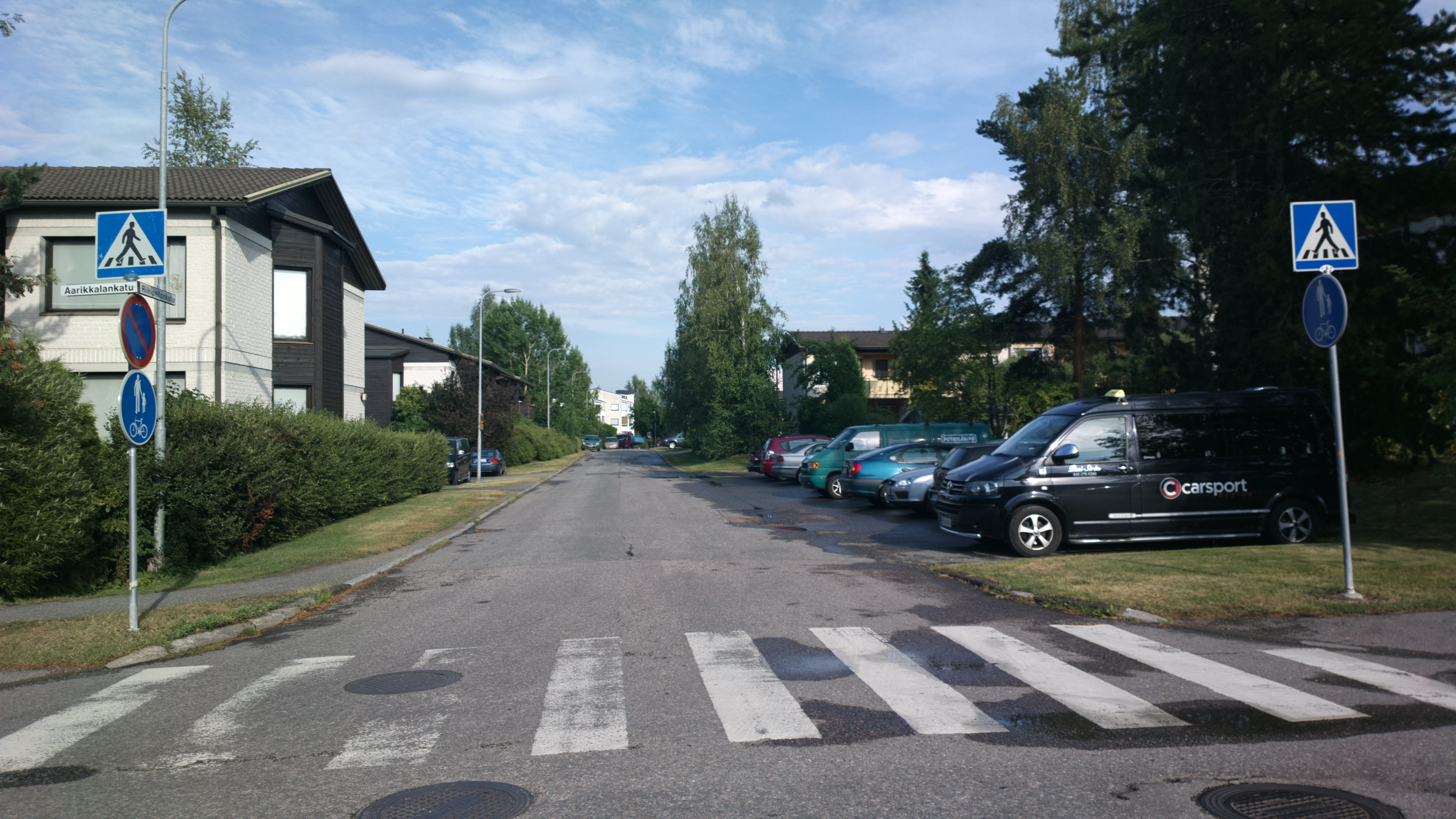
The Riihipellonkatu street in Hakametsä

Hakametsä is a smaller district of Tampere, Finland, located about four kilometers from its city center. The neighboring parts of Hakametsä are Huikas, Ristinarkku, Messukylä, Vuohenoja, Kalevanrinne, Kaleva, Kissanmaa and Uusikylä.

Hakametsä was once the pasture of the Messukylä's parsonage, and it was settled in the late 19th century. The first inhabitants were "gardener Juho Fritzkopf, carpenter August Heino, mixed worker Nestor Rajala, butcher Kalle Lindevall, gardener Aksel Gauffin, baker Kustaa Eklund and baker Lahtinen". The first town plans of Hakametsä and Ristinarkku were confirmed in the 1950s. Finland's first ice rink, Tampere Ice Stadium (also known as Hakametsä Arena), was completed in Hakametsä for the 1965 Ice Hockey World Championships.
