= Järvensivu =

District of Tampere, Finland

Coordinates: 61°29′24″N 23°48′21″E

Looking west along Järvensivuntie

Järvensivu is a district of Tampere, Finland. It extends from the northern shore of Iidesjärvi to the Kalevankangas esker. It borders the districts of Kalevanrinne to the north, Vuohenoja to the south, and Kalevanharju to the west. The population of Järvensivu was 1,327 in 2025.

The Järvensivu Primary School is located in Järvensivu.
