= Jokipohja =

District of Tampere, Finland

Coordinates: 61°28′42″N 23°48′30″E

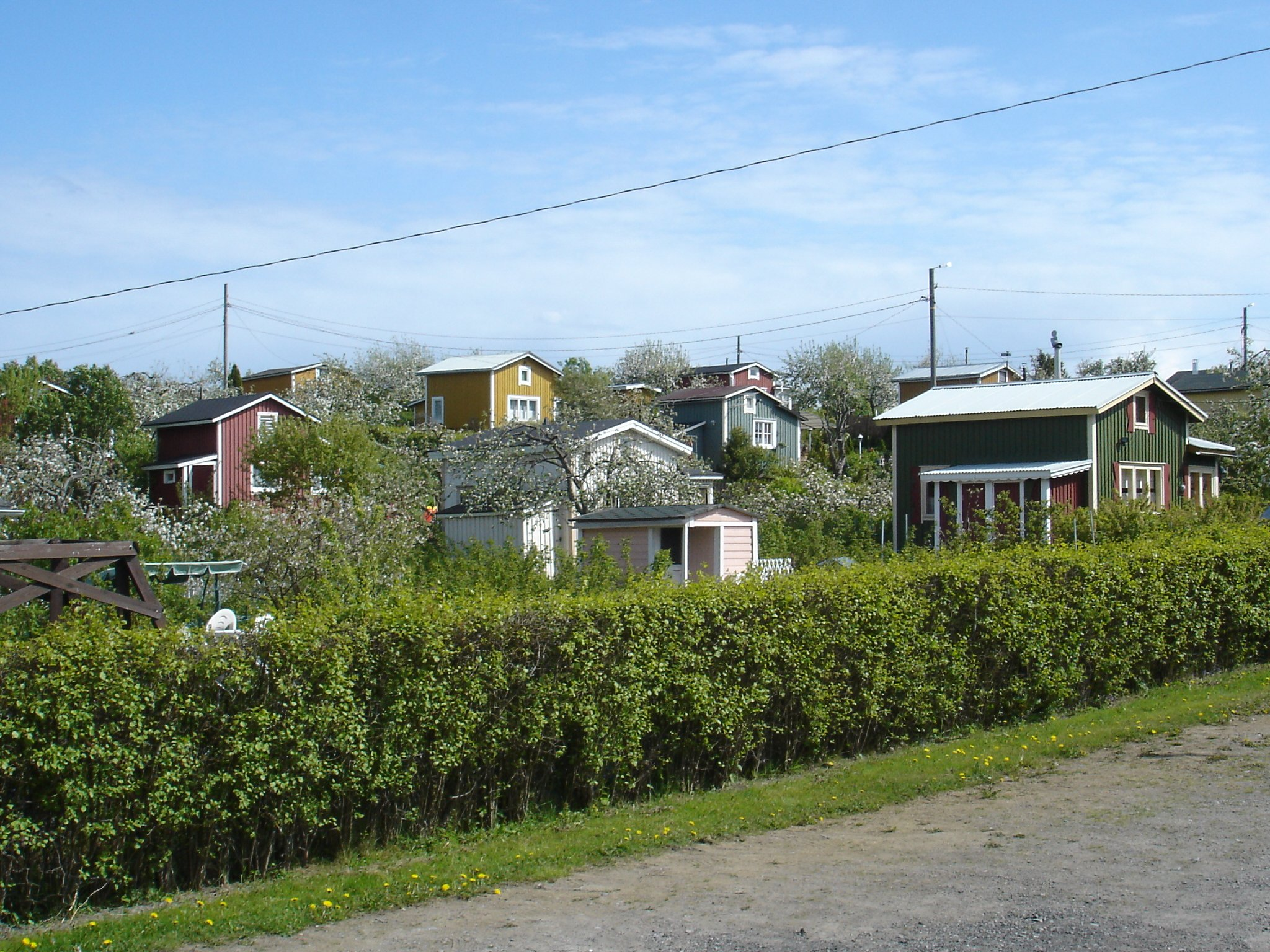
Nekala allotment

Jokipohja is a district of Tampere, Finland. It lies on the southern shore of Iidesjärvi. It borders the districts of Nekala to the north, Muotiala to the east, Veisu to the south, and Vihioja to the west. The population of Jokipohja was 2,205 in 2025.

The Nekala allotment, despite its name, is located in Jokipohja. Established in 1932, it was the third allotment of Tampere. The first disc golf course in Tampere, completed in 1994, is located in the southwestern part of the district in the Vihiojanpuisto park.

The area of Jokipohja was farmland belonging to the Hatanpää Manor and was sold to Tampere in the late 19th and early 20th century.

Jokipohja consists of primarily detached houses, making up 73% of the buildings. Apartment buildings make up 22%.
