= Turtola, Tampere =

City district in Tampere, Finland

Coordinates: 61°28′34.31633″N 23°50′32.49035″E

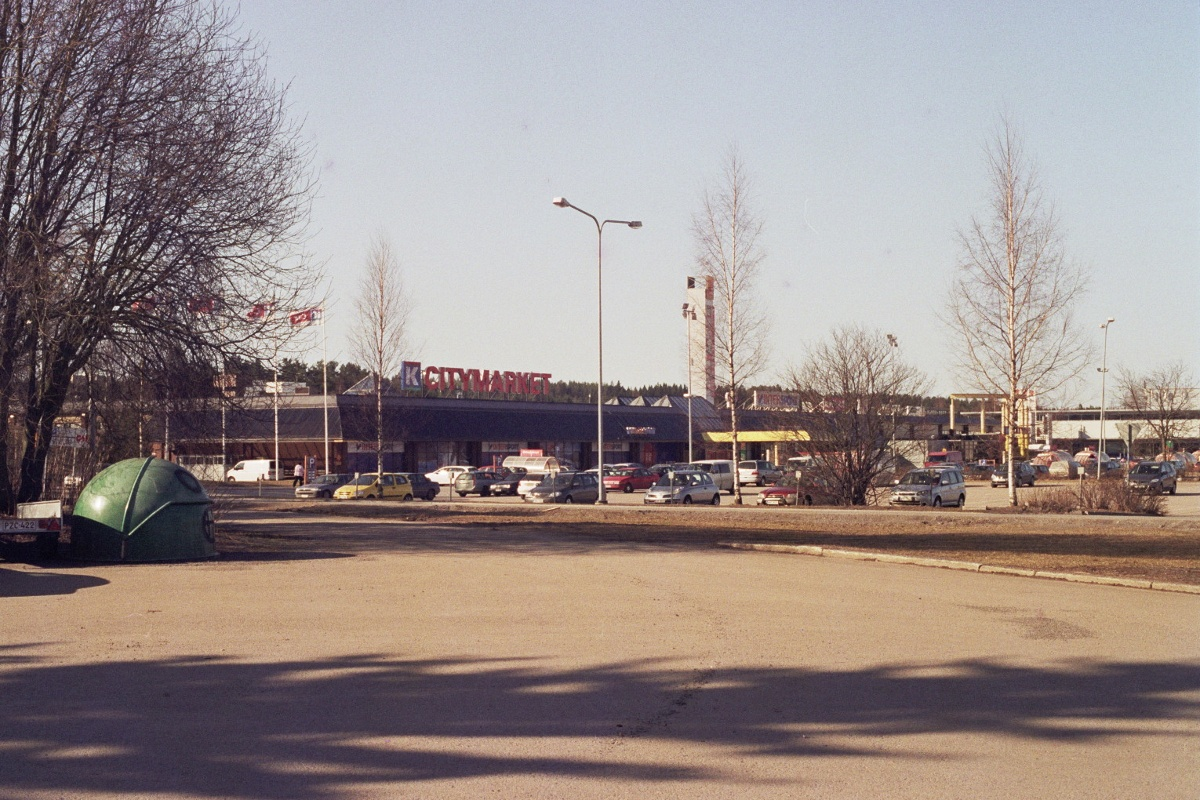
K-Citymarket in Turtola

Turtola (Finnish pronunciation: [ˈturtolɑ]) is a district in Tampere, Finland. It is located in the southeastern part of the city near the Tampere Ring Road, about five kilometers from the city center. Its neighboring parts of the city are Muotiala, Aakkula, Messukylä, Viiala and Korkinmäki. The Hervanta Highway runs through Turtola. One of Tampere's hypermarket centers is located in Turtola.

Turtola, mentioned in the 1540 land register, was one of the houses of Messukylä – Messukylä's parish book village, which originally belonged to the parish of the Greater Pirkkala. However, a document dating back to 1465 mentions Olaff Twrdo as a representative of the Messukylä division. There is no complete certainty about the origin of the name Turto, but according to Professor Viljo Nissilä, the name Turto can be combined with the verb turtu and the adjective turta. Professor K. V. Kaukovalta also associates the Finnish adjective turta with the meaning 'heavy-hearted and serious'. The village name Tursola in Kangasala and Sahalahti may have the same root. The name Turto is also associated in some sources with the Swedish male given name Tord. Turtola became a rustholl in the 18th century and was divided into two parts, Turtola and Turtos, in 1773. The municipality of Messukylä was annexed to the city of Tampere at the beginning of 1947 and the first town plan of the Turtola district was approved in 1963.
