= Kalle Suosalo =

Finnish politician (1869–1918)

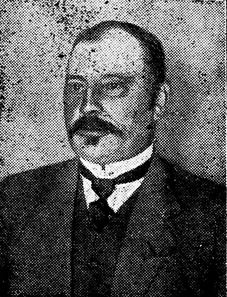

Karl (Kalle) Aleksander Suosalo (9 February 1869 – 2 March 1918; original surname Johansson) was a Finnish baker and politician. He was a member of the Parliament of Finland from 1916 to 1917, representing the Social Democratic Party of Finland (SDP).

Suosalo was born in Messukylä. When the Finnish Civil War broke out on 27 January 1918, he was living in Jakobstad, where the White side established control in the first days of the war. Suosalo had not taken part in any actual hostilities, but he was arrested on 15 February as a supporter of the Red side. He was sentenced to death in a drumhead court-martial and shot in Jakobstad on 2 March 1918 together with six other men, accused of having taken part in an alleged plot to blow up the Jakobstad Artillery School. Kalle Suosalo was the father of MP Vilho Suosalo and the great grandfather of actor Martti Suosalo.
