= Vilho Suosalo =

Finnish politician (1910–1976)

Vilho Pekka Suosalo (17 May 1910, Jakobstad - 27 July 1976) was a Finnish bricklayer and politician. He was a member of the Parliament of Finland from 1962 to 1966, representing the Finnish People's Democratic League (SKDL). Kalle Suosalo was his father.
