= Nirva =

City district in Tampere, Finland

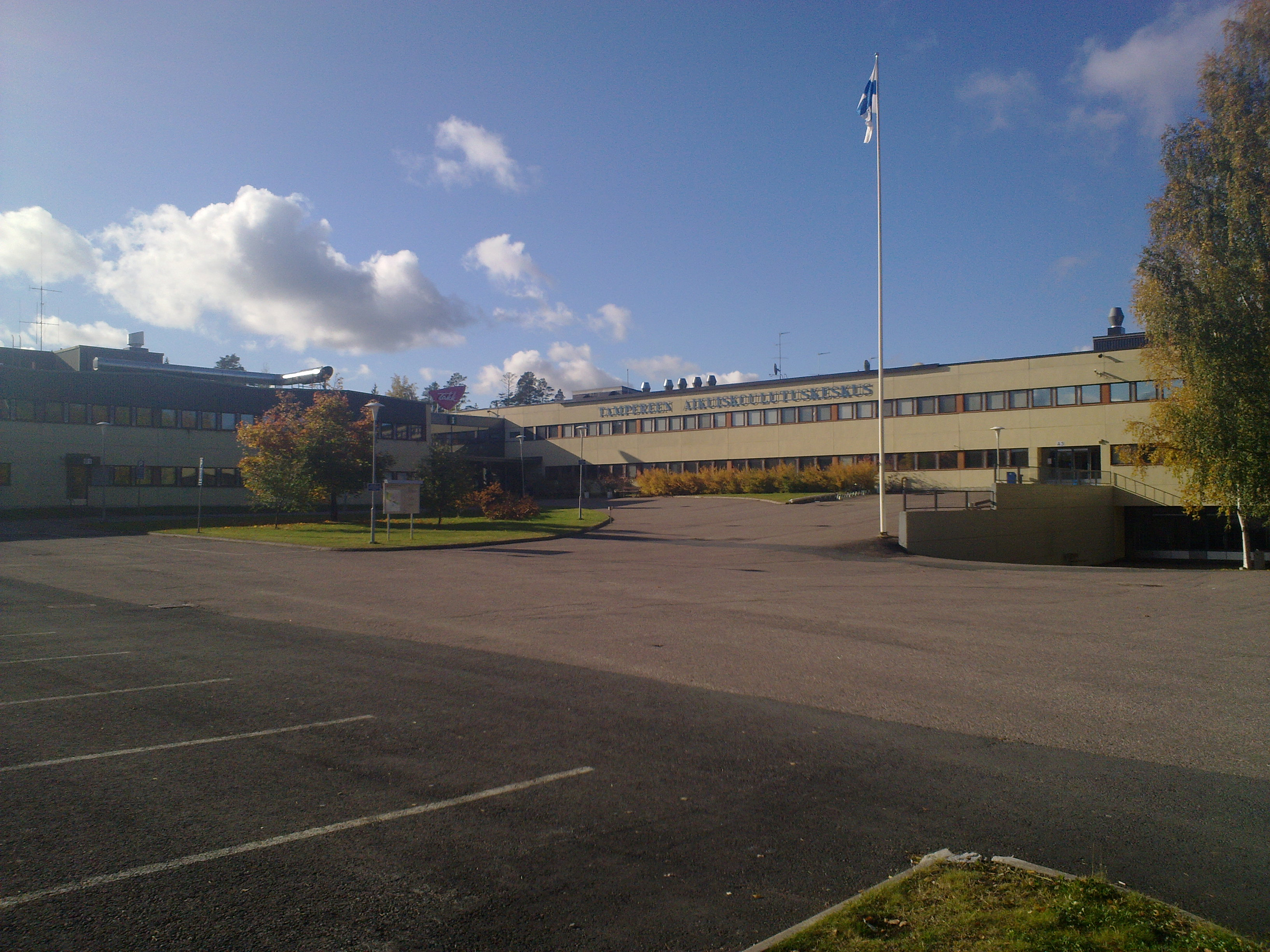
Tampere Adult Education Center in Nirva

Nirva is a neighbourhood in the southern part of the city of Tampere, Finland, and it is located between Koivistonkylä and Lahdesjärvi districts. Nirva had a population of 462 at the end of 2007, as the residential buildings in the area are mainly detached houses, in addition to a few terraced houses. There are less than 200 residential houses, and new construction is low due to the small number of properties. The Tampere Adult Education Center (Tampereen Aikuiskoulutuskeskus) operates in the area, otherwise there are no services in Nirva; the nearest ones can be found in the Koivistonkylä district.
