= Feliks Kellosalmi =

Finnish politician

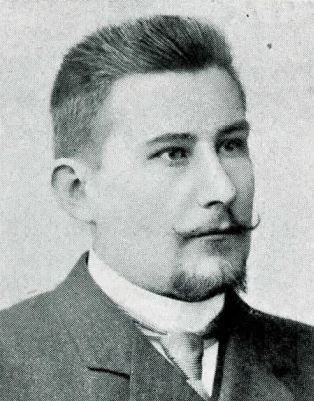
Image of F. E. Kellosalmi

Felix (Feliks) Emil Kellosalmi (3 June 1877, Messukylä - 28 March 1939; surname until 1908 Pettersson; name as Soviet citizen Феликс Петрович Келлосальми) was a Finnish typesetter and politician. He was a member of the Parliament of Finland from 1909 to 1911 and again from 1917 to 1918, representing the Social Democratic Party of Finland (SDP). He sided with the Reds during the Finnish Civil War and after the defeat of the Red side he went into exile in Soviet Russia. He joined the Communist Party of the Soviet Union and settled in the Karelian ASSR, where he worked as a journalist, as a teacher, as a translator and in other functions. He was expelled from the Communist Party on 16 October 1935 and arrested by the NKVD on 21 October 1935. He was set free on 5 February 1936 because of his weakened state of health. The charges against him were dropped, but he was not reinstated as a party member. He died in Petrozavodsk on 28 March 1939.
