= Heikki Lindroos =

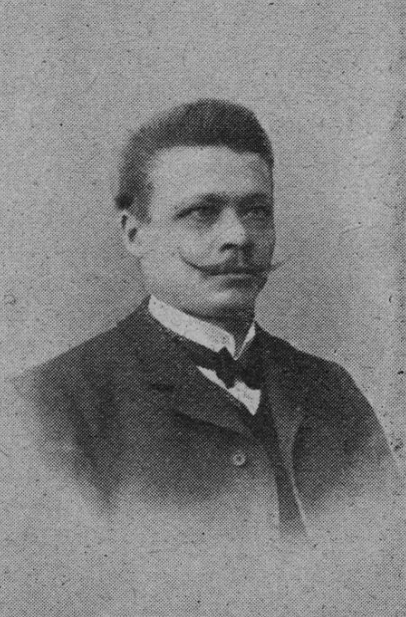
Heikki Lindroos

Henrik (Heikki) Viktor Lindroos (31 May 1865 – 16 April 1915) was a Finnish cooperative manager and politician, born in Messukylä. He was a member of the Diet of Finland from 1904 to 1905 and of the Parliament of Finland from 1907 to 1908, representing the Social Democratic Party of Finland (SDP).
