= Vilho Lehokas =

Finnish politician (1876–1918)

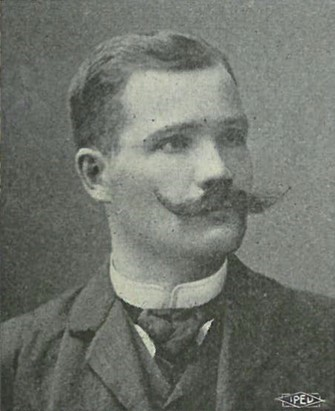
Image of Vilho Lehokas

Wilhelm (Vilho) Bernhard Lehokas (24 April 1876 in Messukylä – May 1918 in Viipuri; original surname Löfqvist) was a Finnish upholsterer and politician. He was a member of the Parliament of Finland from 1916 to 1918. During the Finnish Civil War, he sided with the Reds, was made prisoner by White troops and shot in Viipuri in May 1918.
