= Muotiala =

District of Tampere, Finland

Coordinates: 61°28′44″N 23°49′29″E

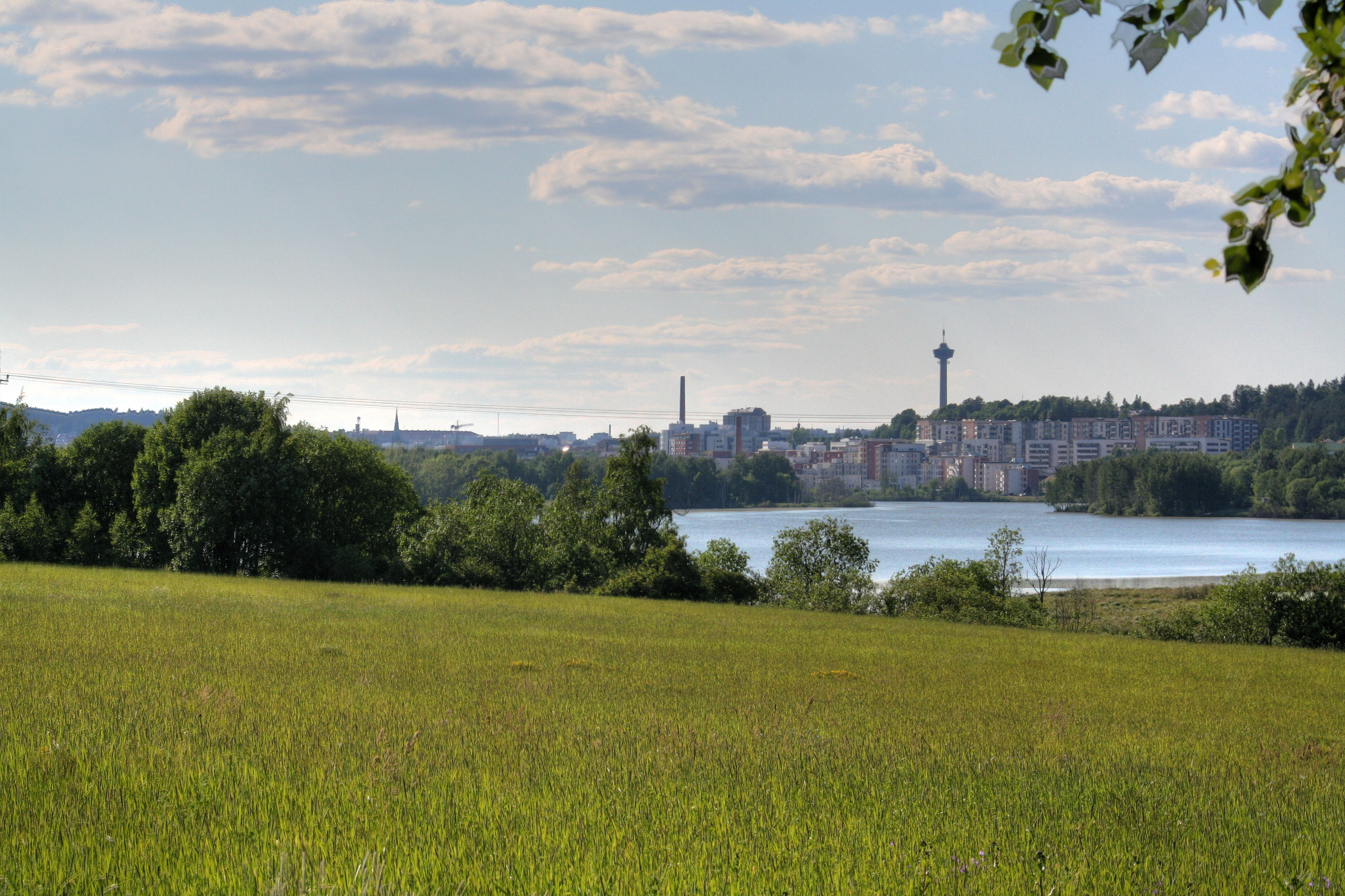
Iidesjärvi seen from Muotiala

Muotiala is a district of Tampere, Finland. It lies on the southeastern shore of Iidesjärvi. It borders the districts of Vuohenoja to the north, Turtola to the east, Korkinmäki to the south, and Jokipohja to the west. The population of Muotiala was 1,760 in 2025.

The Tampere Steiner school, built in 2007, is located in Muotiala. The district was developed as a pilot project for safety-focused urban planning in Finland. Similar approaches to urban planning had previously been implemented in several countries with positive results. Research published in 2008 found the project to have been successful. Feeling of unsafety is very low among residents.
