= Ristinarkku =

City district in Tampere, Finland

Coordinates: 61°29′21.99473″N 23°51′17.79433″E

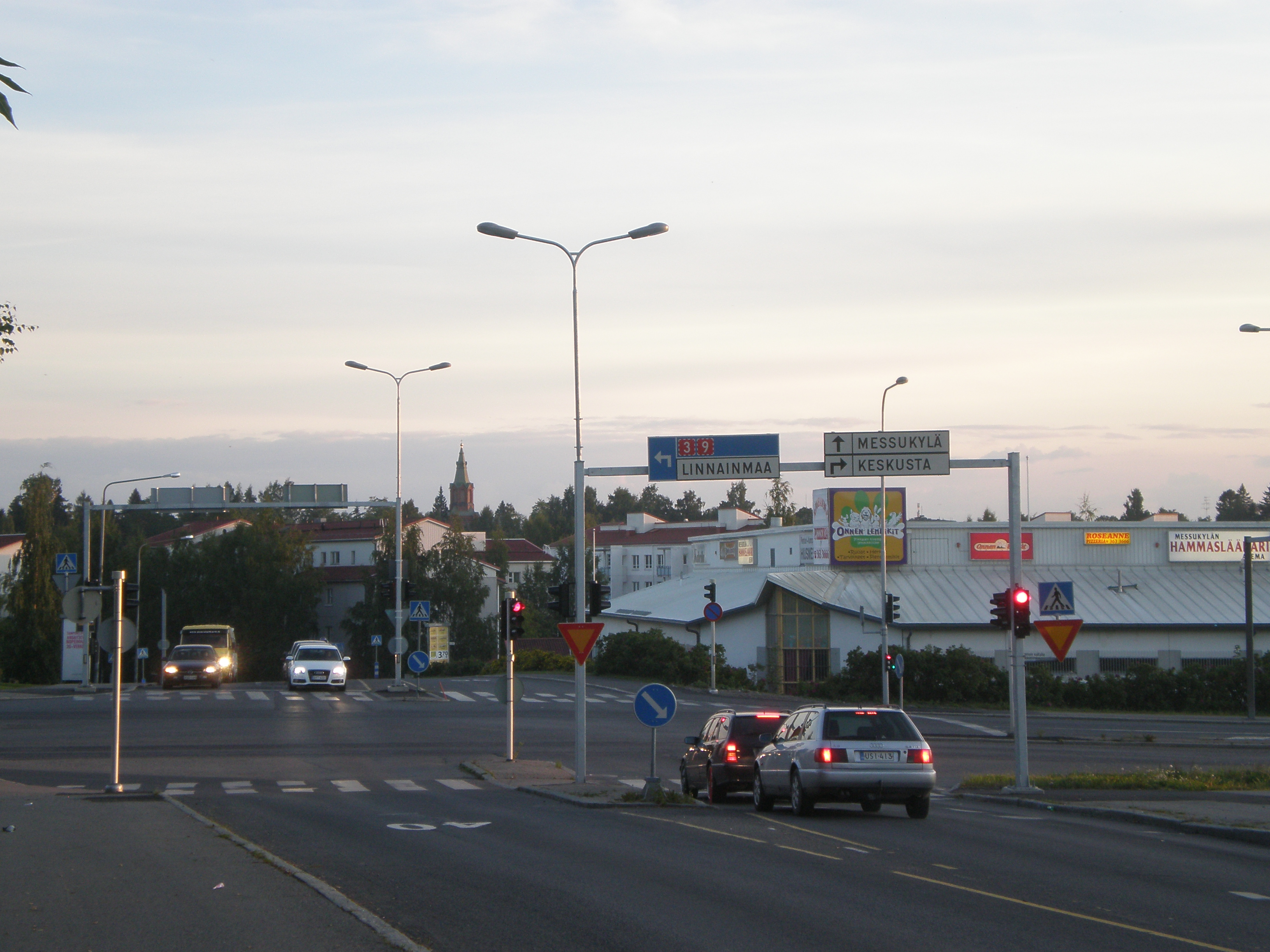
View from Pappila to Ristinarkku

Ristinarkku (Finnish pronunciation: [ˈristinˌɑrkːu]) is a district in Tampere, Finland. The district also includes the Janka's residential area. There are a school and several retail stores in the area. The area is close to the city center and has apartment buildings as well as townhouses. The Sampo Highway runs through Ristinarkku, and the district is bordered on the south by the Tampere–Haapamäki railway and on the east by the eastern part of the Tampere Ring Road (Highway 9). The neighboring parts of the city are Hakametsä, Huikas, Takahuhti, Pappila, Linnainmaa, Hankkio and Messukylä.

The Ristinarkku area was the center of the village of Takahuhti, which belonged to Messukylä, where most of the village's houses were still built in the late 19th century as a dense group. The rest of the name Ristinarkku is most likely based on the word orko, which means a meadow or field cleared of drooping. Professor Viljo Nissilä has speculated that a surveyor who has not had local knowledge has written the word orko in what he thinks is a more understandable form of arkku (meaning "coffin"). Thus, the original name Ristinorko, which would have meant the field cleared next to the road junction and gradually also the junction, would have changed into Ristinarkku (literally meaning the "coffing of cross") with a similar phonetic status in the Finnish language. On the other hand, the word arkku is also ambiguous, as it can refer to, for example, a coffin or a bridge support. The roots of the name may date back to the 13th century, as the medieval settlement of Takahuhti had become a group village by the 14th century at the latest. The first town plan of Ristinarkku was confirmed in the 1950s.

The name of the Vehnämyllynkatu street is based on the wheat mill located in Ristinarkku, built in the late 19th century. The mill was demolished in connection with the construction of a street bridge across the railway in 1957.
