= Atala (district) =

City district in Tampere, Finland

Coordinates: 61°30′10.1″N 23°54′24.8″E

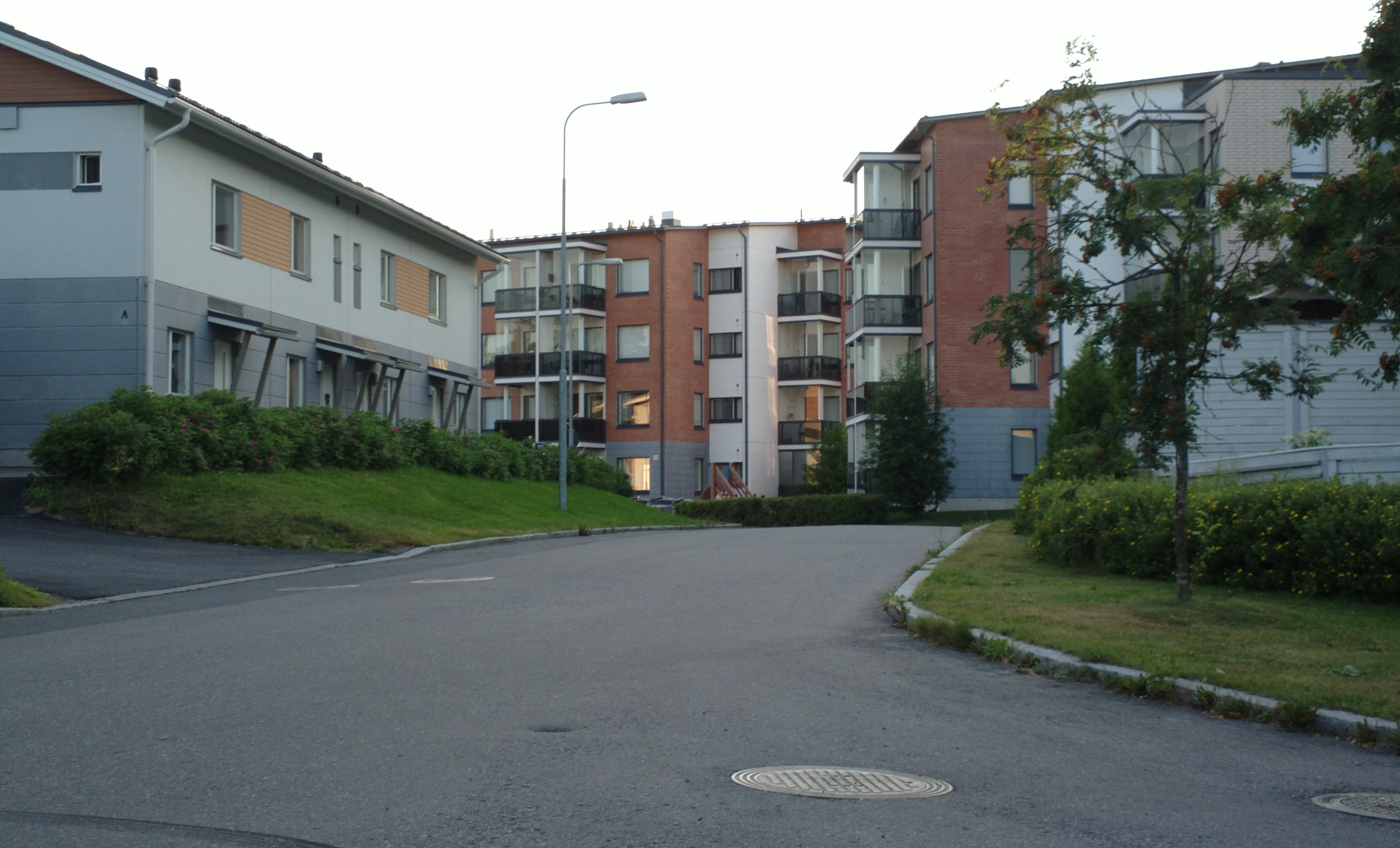
An apartment houses at Vehkakuja in Atala, Tampere

Atala is a neighbourhood in the northeast part of the city of Tampere, Finland, a few kilometers to the east from the border of the Kangasala city. Its neighboring neighborhoods are Holvasti in the south, Linnainmaa in the southwest and Tasanne in the north. The district was named after Ata Oy, which was founded in 1937 and manufactures spiral bevel gears.

In the Atala district, there is a small shopping center with K-Market grocery store, pharmacy and barber's shop, primary school with grades 1–6, and two kindergartens. The services of the health center were transferred to the Linnainmaa district in 2017. The building stock of the Atala district currently consists mainly of terraced and detached houses built since the 1980s. Some older settlements, such as front houses, have also been preserved in the area.

== Sources ==
- Maija Louhivaara: Tampereen kadunnimet, s. 215–217. Tampereen museoiden julkaisuja 51, 1999, Tampere. ISBN 951-609-105-9. (in Finnish)
