= Takahuhti =

City district in Tampere, Finland

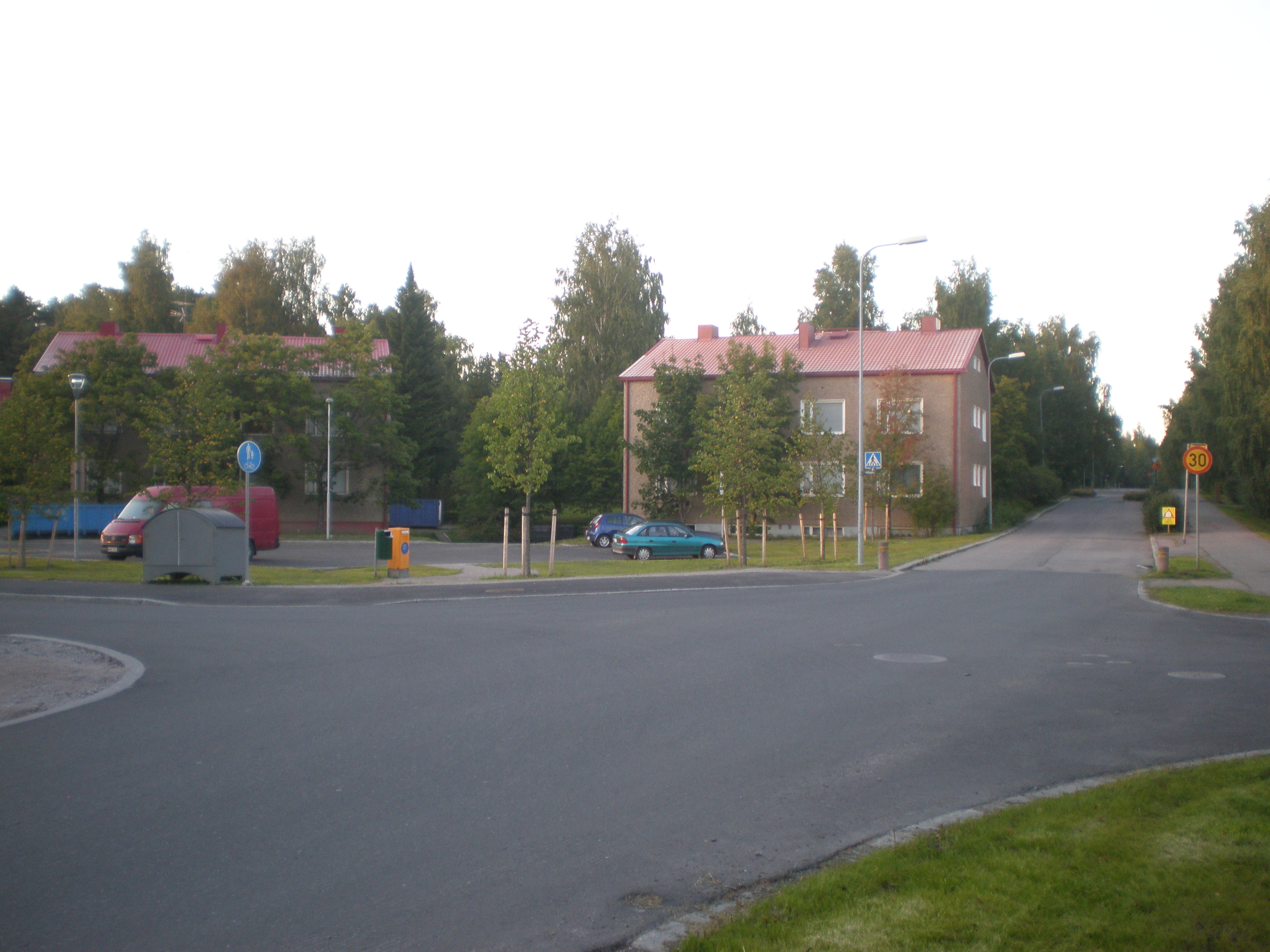
Irjalanaukio, a central square in Takahuhti

Takahuhti is a district in Tampere, Finland. It is located in eastern part of the city, close to Atala, Linnainmaa, Kissanmaa and Messukylä. There are many prehistoric residences and finds in the area. Takahuhti was the largest village in Messukylä from the Middle Ages to the 20th century. The Battle of Tampere was also fought in Takahuhti during the 1918 civil war. The area is dominated by detached houses and there is a school built in 1939.

Historian and professor Unto Salo, has concluded from the ancient discoveries that the village of Takahuhti has been inhabited since the Iron Age and that there were four houses in the village at that time. Four Iron Age cemeteries are known from the village's area of influence, the Kartanonsaari, Kukkoinkivi, Veijanmäki and Pappula cemeteries. According to the 1540 land register, Takahuhti was the largest village in Suur-Pirkkala with 28 houses. Documents show the area as early as 1390, when man named Laurens Takahwktis was the area's observer. The center of the old village of Takahuhti was at the present Ristinarkku district. Takahuhti was annexed to the city of Tampere in connection with the Messukylä municipal association in 1947 and the first town plan was approved in 1952. Takahuhti is mainly a detached house area, but there is also a large apartment building area in the middle of the district.

Takahuhti is bordered on the south by the Sampo Highway (Sammon valtatie), on the east by Linnankatu and the eastern boundary of the field to the north and Kirjavaisenkatu and Kourutaltankatu. To the north, the area is bordered by Teiskontie. In the west, the border of Takahuhti runs along Kuusimäenkatu between Kalmonkatu to Kuusemäenrinne and from there along the creek to Huhmaninkatu.

The center of the Takahuhti district is Irjalanaukio, named after Irjala House. The land register of 1540 mentions the farmer Juho Irjaínen. The surname Irjainen comes from the Finnish given name Yrjänä, which was often written in the form of Yrian in 16th century sources. The name goes back to Saint George, who was a popular saint in the late Middle Ages.
