= Nokia Arena (Tampere) =

Finnish ice hockey arena

- Nokia-areena

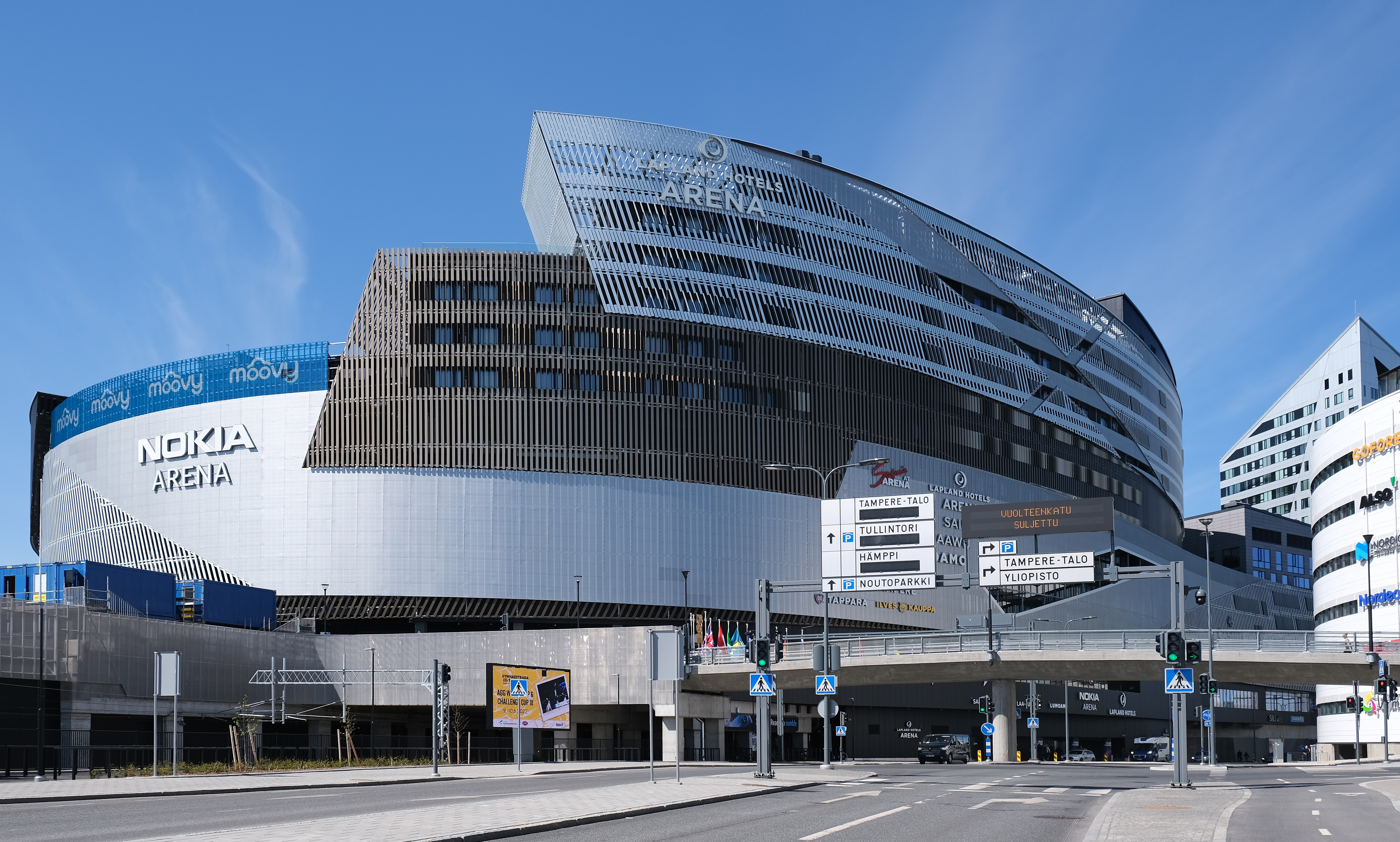
- The arena, with the hotel on top, in May 2022
- Interactive map of Nokia Arena
- Full name: Tampere Deck Arena (Tampereen Kannen areena)
- Former names: Tampere Deck Arena; Tampere Central Multipurpose Arena; UROS LIVE
- Address: Kansikatu 3
- Location: Tampere, Finland
- Coordinates: 61.493952°N 23.772955°E
- Owner: LähiTapiola; OP; Ilmarinen; SRV Group; City of Tampere
- Operator: Tampere Deck and Arena Management Oy
- Capacity: 12,700 (ice hockey); 15,000 (concerts)
- Executive suites: 63
- Screens: Center-hung media cube, two ribbon displays
- Record attendance: 13,054
- Field size: 60 m (200 ft) by 28 m (92 ft)
- Acreage: 50,000 m^{2}

Construction
- Groundbreaking: 2018
- Opened: 3 December 2021
- Cost: €124 million (estimated)
- Architect: Daniel Libeskind
- Structural engineer: Ramboll Finland
- Main contractor: SRV-yhtiöt

Tenants
- Tappara (ice hockey); Ilves (ice hockey)

Website
- nokiaarena.fi/en/

The Nokia Arena, also known by its non-sponsored name Tampere Deck Arena (Finnish: Tampereen Kannen areena), is an indoor arena in Tampere, Finland, which hosts ice hockey games and large cultural events. It is the home arena of Ilves and Tappara of the SM-liiga. Its construction was approved by the City Council of Tampere on 19 May 2010, and it was officially opened on 3 December 2021 and was the first arena in the world to feature LED dasher boards.

== Background ==
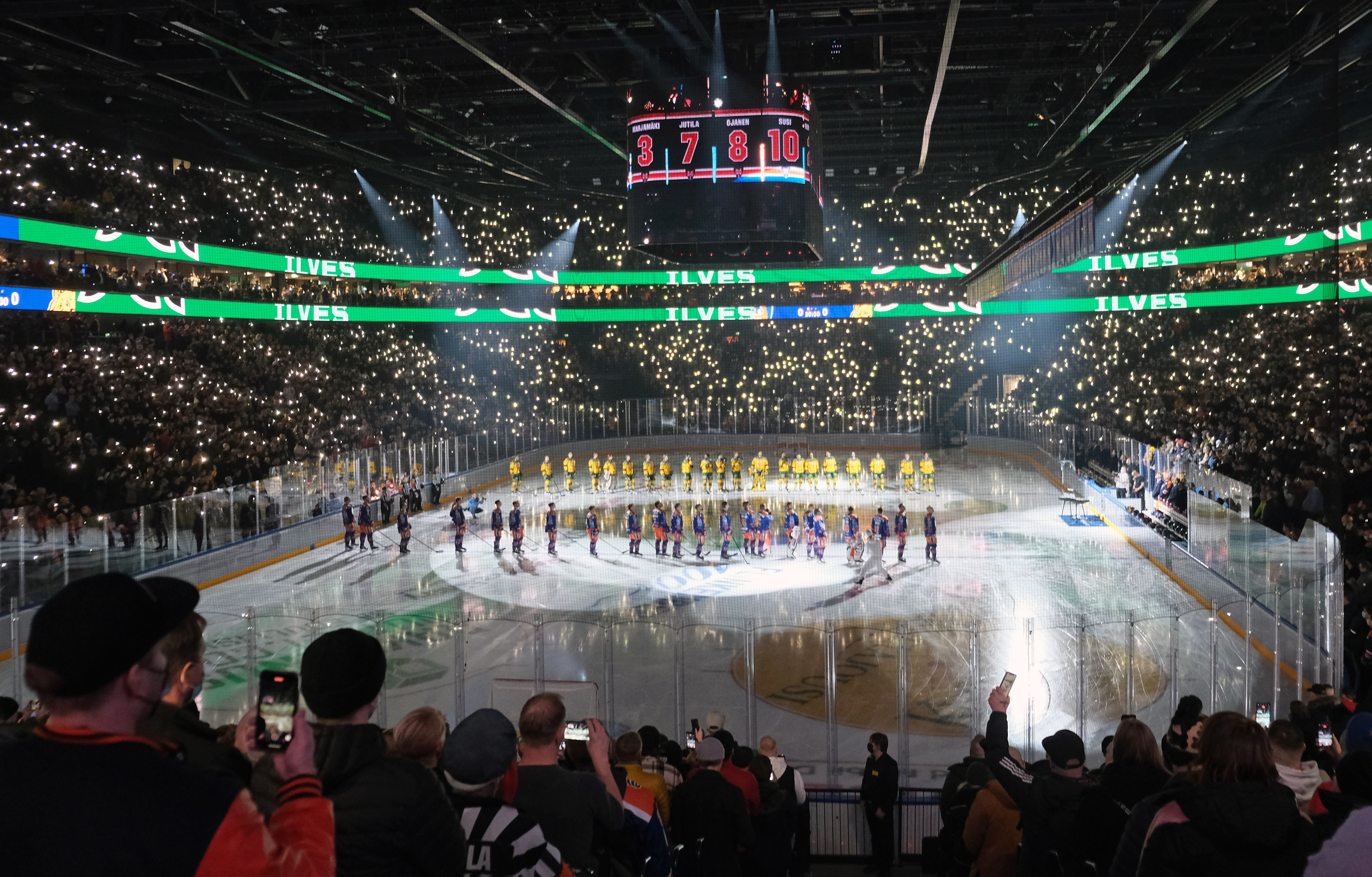
The opening ice hockey game at the arena

After delays, the arena and the adjacent mixed use high-rise development got a final approval and construction began in January 2018. The final plan calls for a deck to be built over a railway line. This deck will have the multi-purpose arena (at least 13,455 seats), offices, commercial development, housing, a hotel and a casino. The overall vision was designed by Daniel Libeskind. The arena was completed by December 2021, in time for the 2022 IIHF World Championship. The rest of the development is to be completed by 2024. Casino Tampere will also open in connection with the arena, and according to preliminary plans, the casino will employ about 80 people. Lapland Hotels opened a luxury hotel called Lapland Hotels Arena next to the arena on 12 December 2021.

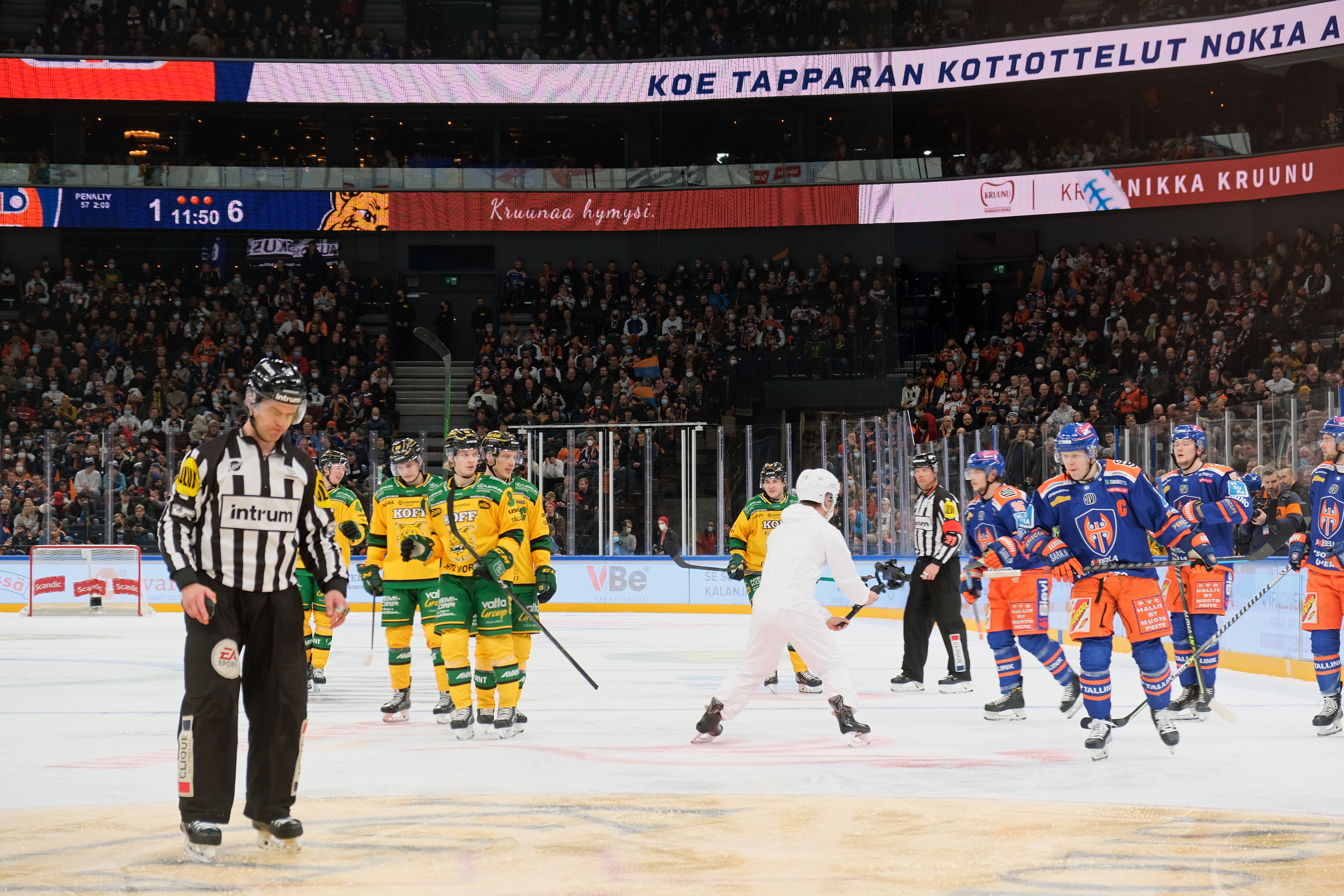
The match between Ilves (yellow and green) and Tappara (blue and orange) on 3 December 2021 at Nokia Arena

In March 2020, it was announced that, under a ten-year sponsorship agreement with the UROS Group in Oulu, the arena would be called "UROS LIVE". The naming caused a small scale scandal due to name's overly masculine tone, as uros means "male" in Finnish. The agreement was terminated on 28 October 2021 due to Uros Oy's financial problems, and the name of the arena was changed as a result. Nokia Corporation was chosen as the new sponsor on 19 November 2021, and the arena was renamed as "Nokia Arena".

The first scheduled events in the arena were the local matches of the Finnish Championship League on 3 and 4 December 2021. It was originally scheduled to open on 15 December, but later the official opening was brought forward to 3 December.

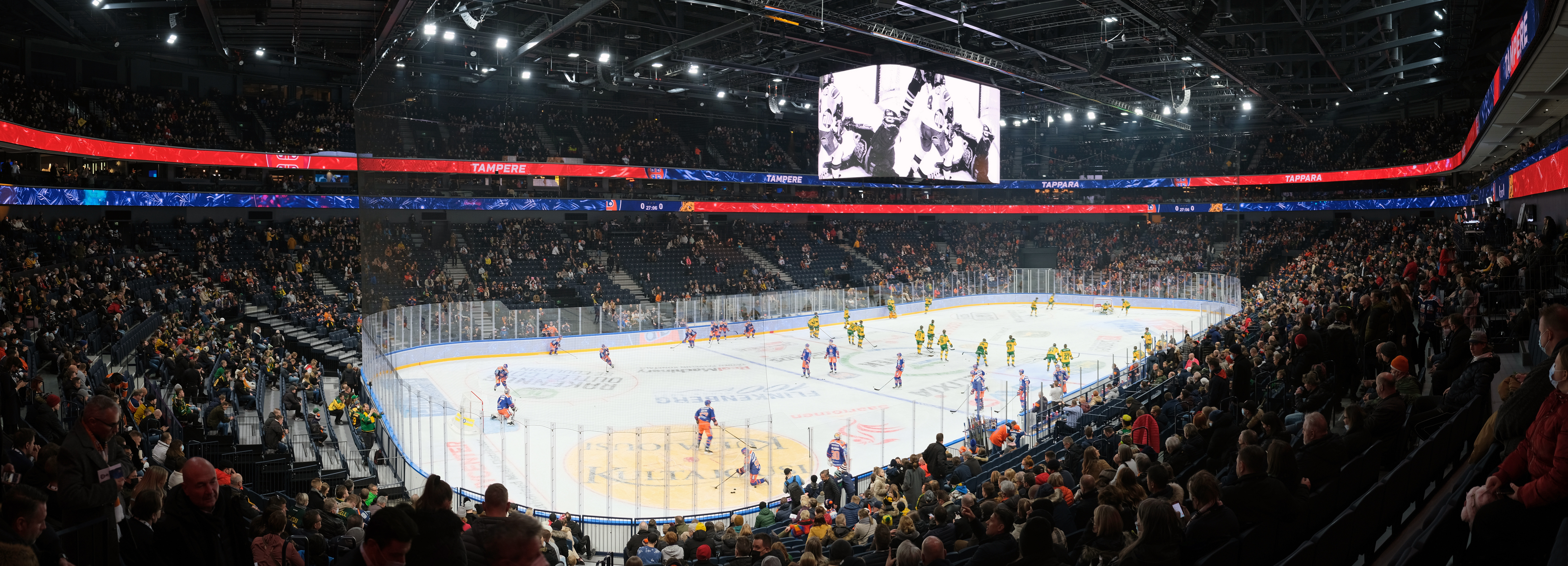
Nokia Arena opening

== Events ==
The NHL teams Columbus Blue Jackets and Colorado Avalanche played two games at the Nokia Arena in the 2022 NHL Global Series on 4–5 November 2022. 12,882 spectators showed up for the first game between two NHL teams at the Nokia Arena. The Dallas Stars and Florida Panthers played two games at the Nokia Arena in the 2024 NHL Global Series on 1–2 November 2024. Nokia Arena hosted back-to-back IIHF Ice Hockey World Championships in 2022 and 2023.

On 4 August 2023, the attendance record of 13,054 was set in a men's basketball game between Finland and Lithuania.

In 2024, 2025 and 2026, the venue hosted Uuden Musiikin Kilpailu (UMK), the Finnish selection for the Eurovision Song Contest. In 2025, it hosted the group phase matches of the FIBA EuroBasket Group B. On 16 May 2026 the arena held fighting event Ice cage 7. The event broke the previous attendance record with 14,550 spectators present at the arena during the event.

The arena has been announced as the venue for the 2027 World Figure Skating Championships.

=== Concerts ===
Date	Artist(s)	Tour/Event
15 December 2021	Eppu Normaali with the Tampere Philharmonic Orchestra	Arena opening
16 December 2021	Popeda	Voitto Kaikesta Tour
17 December 2021	Raskasta Joulua	
26 March 2022	Lauri Tähkä	
22 April 2022	Nightwish	Human. :II: Nature. World Tour
27 April 2022	Ghost	Imperatour
17 June 2022	Eric Clapton	
19 June 2022	Evanescence	
24 July 2022	Queen + Adam Lambert	The Rhapsody Tour
25 July 2022	Queen + Adam Lambert	The Rhapsody Tour
20 September 2022	Sting	My Songs Tour
23 October 2022	Volbeat	Servant of the Road World Tour
12 November 2022	Ellinoora, Kaija Koo, Jenni Vartiainen & Vesala	Mestarit Tour
5 December 2022	Haloo Helsinki!	
17 December 2022	Suvi Teräsniska	
18 December 2022	Raskasta Joulua	
2 February 2023	Dream Theater	Top of the World Tour
5 March 2023	Robbie Williams	XXV Tour
24 March 2023	Yö	40th Anniversary Concert
31 March 2023	Antti Tuisku	Mayhem Tour
1 April 2023	Antti Tuisku	Mayhem Tour
4 April 2023	Andrea Bocelli	Believe World Tour
3 June 2023	Iron Maiden	The Future Past Tour
4 June 2023	Iron Maiden	The Future Past Tour
24 November 2023	Jarkko Ahola & Valtteri Torikka	Kuninkaiden paluu
9 December 2023	Raskasta Joulua	
27 April 2024	Blind Channel	Exit Emotions Tour
5 June 2024	Judas Priest	Invincible Shield Tour
5 July 2024	Bryan Adams	So Happy It Hurts Tour
25 October 2024	Apulanta & Lahti Symphony Orchestra	
26 October 2024	Apulanta & Lahti Symphony Orchestra	
8 November 2024	PMMP	Viimeinen Valitusvirsi Tour
22 November 2024	Kuumaa	Maasta Kuuhun Tour
23 November 2024	Vesterinen yhtyeineen	Hetken Ikuinen Tour
5 December 2024	Maija Vilkkumaa	Vilkku-maa
14 December 2024	Raskasta Joulua	
2 March 2025	Toto	Dogs of Oz Tour
25 April 2025	Rod Stewart	One Last Time Tour
20 May 2025	Ghost	Skeletour
3 June 2025	Duran Duran	Europe 2025 Tour
9 June 2025	Scorpions	S60rpions
15 October 2025	Volbeat	Greatest of All Tours
21 November 2025	Battle Beast	European Tour 2025
22 November 2025	Ellinoora	Ellinoora 4Ever
5 December 2025	Kolmas nainen Leavings feat. Timo Rautiainen	Suomirockin juhlaa
13 December 2025	Raskasta Joulua	
18 April 2026	Haloo Helsinki!	Arena Tour 2026
12 June 2026	Deep Purple	Mad in Europe
12 July 2026	Various artists	Pate Mustajärvi memorial concert

== Transport ==
Nokia Arena is easily accessible by public transport, being located 600 meters from the Tampere central railway station and 350 meters from the long-distance bus station. The nearest stops on the Tampere tramway are also approximately 600 and 350 meters away, for lines 3 and 1 respectively. Several local bus routes run on the nearby streets. During the 2023–24 Liiga and CHL seasons, hockey game tickets are also valid tickets for the buses, trams and trains of Nysse, the regional transport authority.

For private cars, there are few parking spaces at the arena but several parking facilities are available nearby. Before and after major events, the streets around the arena may be closed to vehicular traffic.

== See also ==
- List of indoor arenas in Nordic countries
- List of Finnish ice hockey arenas
- Tampere Ice Stadium
