= Linnainmaa =

City district in Tampere, Finland

Coordinates: 61°29′28″N 23°53′25″E

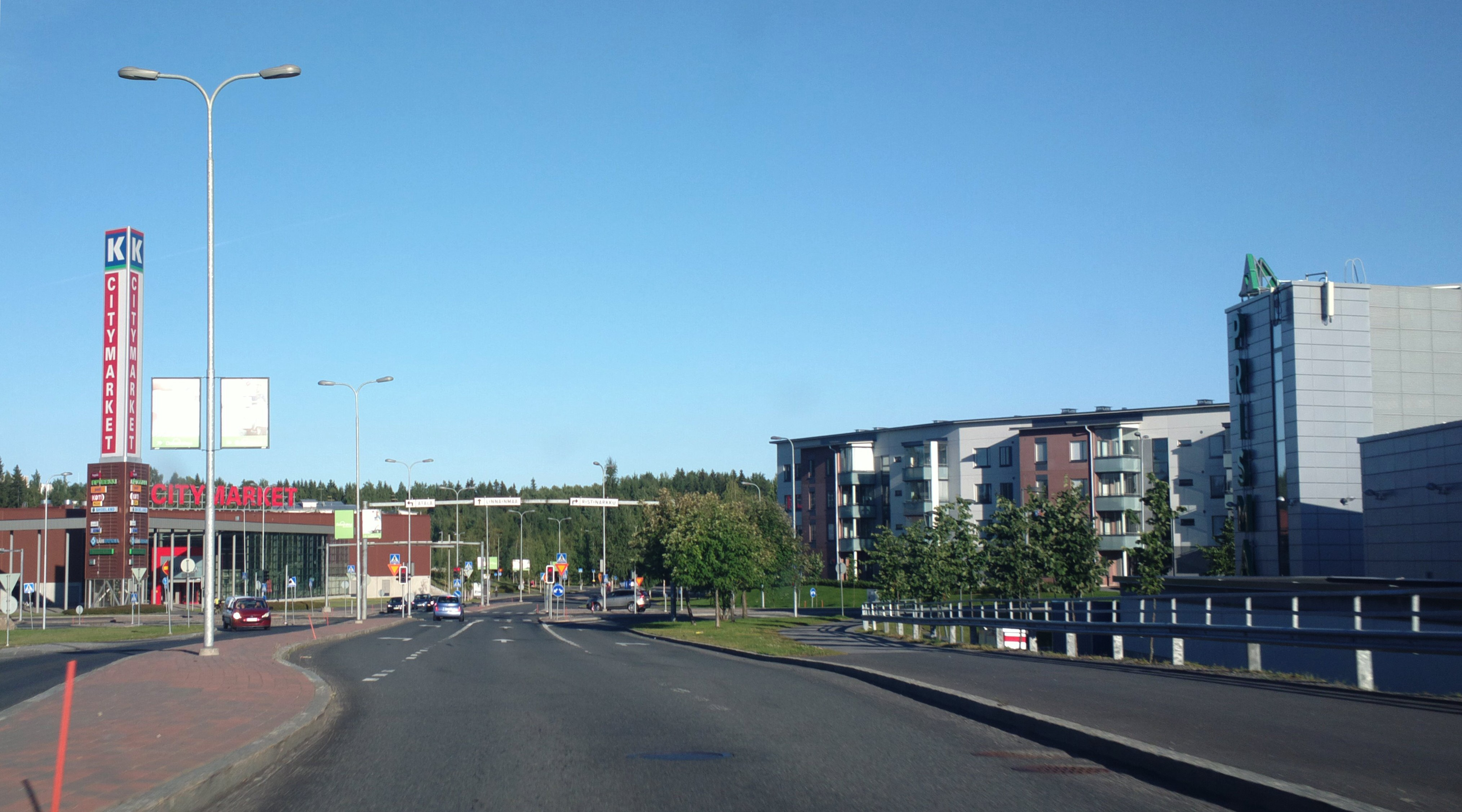
The centre of Linnainmaa

Linnainmaa is a district of about 6,000 inhabitants in the eastern part of Tampere, Finland, about six kilometers from the city center. Tampere's eastern bypass borders Linnainmaa in the west, and Highway 12 in the north. The building stock of Linnainmaa consists mainly of detached houses built in the 1950s and 1960s, as well as newer detached, multi-storey and terraced houses. The average age of those living in Linnainmaa is 40.9 years. The largest age group is 30-49 years old. The majority of the residents of the district are employed, the second largest are pensioners.

== History and etymology ==
The origin of the name of Linnainmaa has been difficult to determine. The minutes of the Great Partition of 1785 mention a field called Linnama, which was jointly owned by several Messukylä houses; the name may thus refer to the main estate of Linna (meaning "castle"). On the other hand, the name of the field may also have been Liinamaa, ie a field where flax has been grown. In western dialects, flax has been called liina (Swedish lin) and flax has been known to have been cultivated in the region as early as the 18th century, on the basis of which it can be assumed that Linnama was an incorrect notation for a Finnish-speaking scribe. The current name of the district is also inaccurate, as the old locals have used the name "Jussila area" according to the Jussila's farm located there.

Linnainmaa's first town plan was approved in 1955, and detached houses, terraced houses and apartment buildings have been built in the area since the 1970s. In the street nomenclature, Alanikkilänkatu, Hannulankatu, Jussilankatu, Kirviälänkatu and Ylinikkilänkatu refer to old main buildings; In the 1960s, Kirviälä was on display as one of the options for the name of the district.

== Services ==
Linnainmaa School is a primary school comprising grades 1-9. Linnainmaa Health Center serves the residents of the area.

Linnainmaa's commercial services have been concentrated since the 1990s near the intersection of Tampere's eastern bypasses and the Lahti Road. The new center of the district, called Koilliskeskus, will be used to develop Tampere's third regional center, which will serve not only the people of Linnainmaa but also the residents of other eastern districts. Linnainmaa has Prisma and K-Citymarket, which provide both commercial and public services.

Linnainmaa belongs to the parish of Messukylä. There is a parish house in the area.

== See also ==
- Ristinarkku
