= Tampere Ice Stadium =

Indoors sports arena in Tampere, Finland

Tampere Ice Stadium Tampereen jäähalli
- Hakametsä
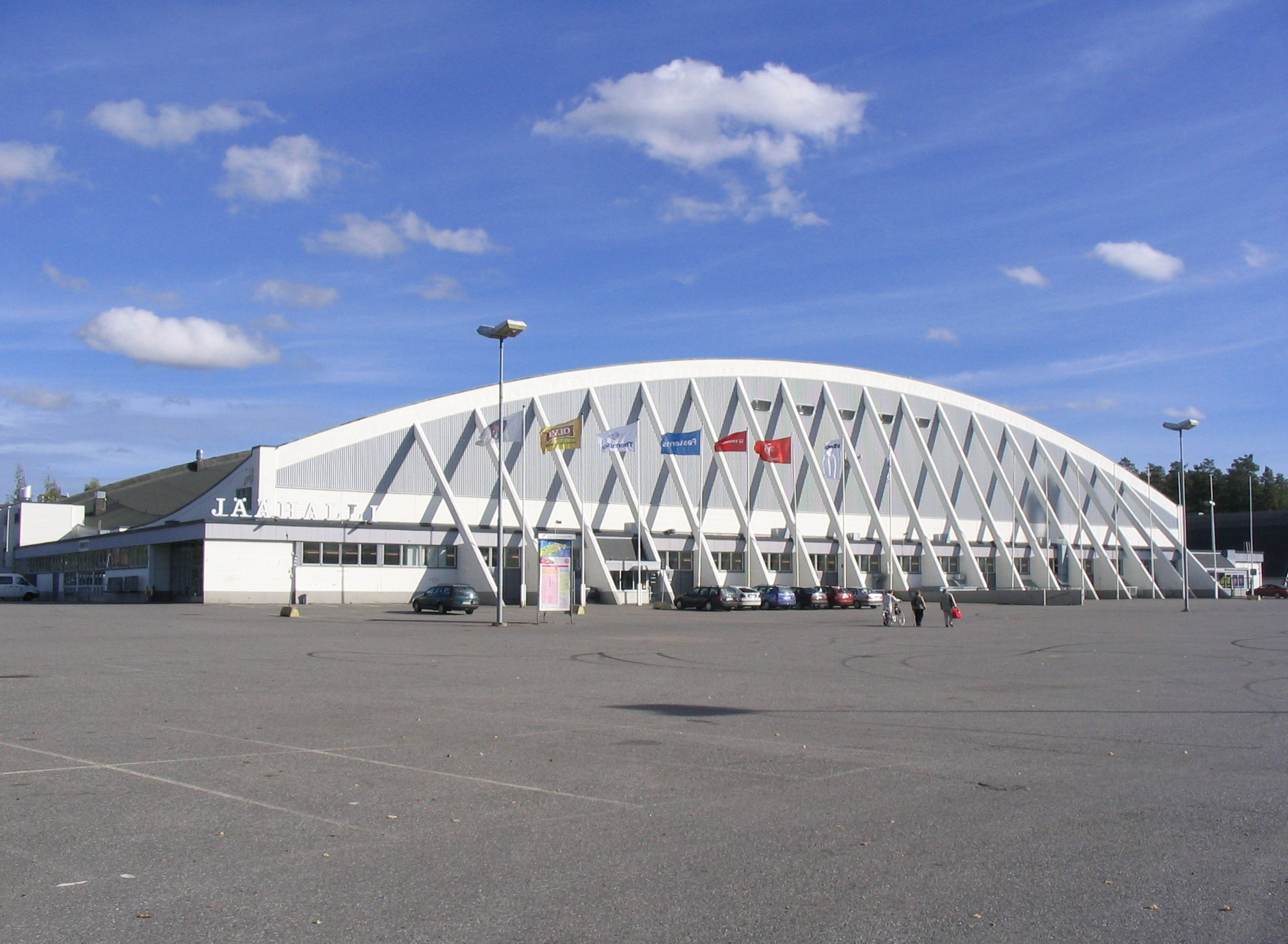
- Tampere Ice Stadium in September 2006
- Interactive map of Tampere Ice Stadium; Tampereen jäähalli
- Location: Keltinkatu 2 Tampere, Finland
- Coordinates: 61°29′45″N 023°49′27″E
- Owner: City of Tampere
- Capacity: 7,300 (5,629 seated, 1,359 standing, 312 suites)
- Surface: ice

Construction
- Opened: 29 January 1965; 61 years ago
- Renovated: 1981, 1990, 2001–2002, 2009, 2014
- Expanded: 2007
- Cost: €1.2 million (in 2005 currency)
- Architect: Jaakko Tähtinen

Tenants
- Ilves (1965–2021); Tappara (1965–2021); Koovee (1965–83, 1994–97 2018–present)

Website
- www.tampere.fi/...

Tampere Ice Stadium (Finnish: Tampereen jäähalli, often called Hakametsä) is an indoor sports arena in Tampere, Finland. It is primarily used for ice hockey, and it was the former home arena of Ilves and Tappara of the Finnish Liiga until November 2021, when both teams moved to the new Nokia Arena.

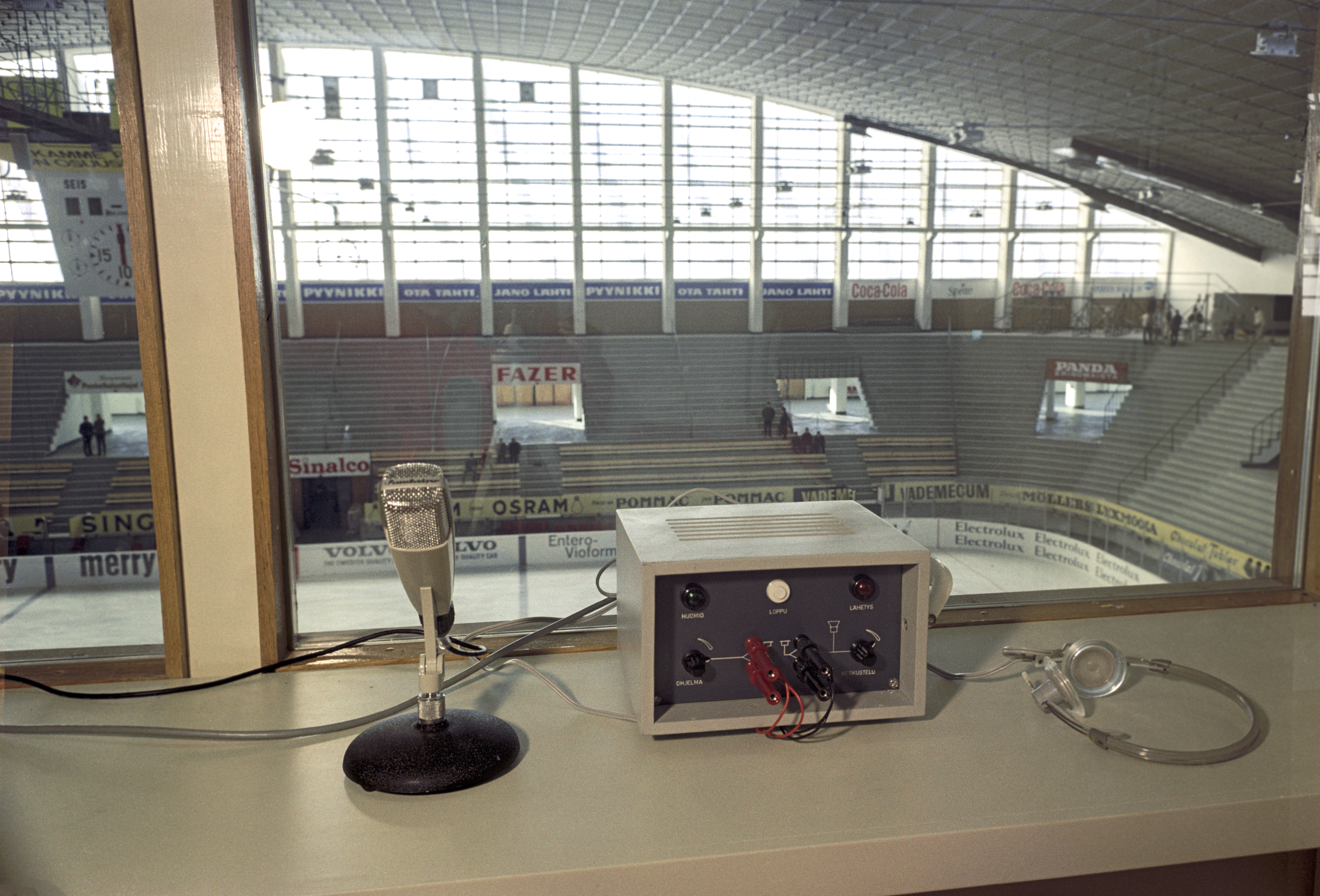
Yle commentator booth in Hakametsä 1965.

Tampere Ice Stadium is the first and the oldest ice hockey arena in the country.

The first game in the arena was an all-star game between Tampere and the rest of Finland, played on January 29, 1965.

== Future ==
In the late 1990s and the early 2000s there were plans to build a new multi-purpose arena in Tampere, following the example of the Hartwall Areena built in Helsinki in 1997. However, these plans did not come to fruition, and the Hakametsä arena continued to serve as the primary hockey venue in the city. In May 2010, the Tampere City Council approved plans for the Tampereen monitoimiareena, which opened 3 December 2021. After 56 years at the venue, both Ilves and Tappara moved into the new Nokia Arena for the 2021-22 Liiga season.

A new exercise and sports area Hakametsä Sport Campus is growing around the Ice Stadium. In the winning concept of Peab and YH Kodit, Hakametsä will have apartments, new sports facilities and business and office facilities for sports companies, services or training. The old Ice Stadium will be renovated and, in addition to ice use, facilities will be created for other sports.

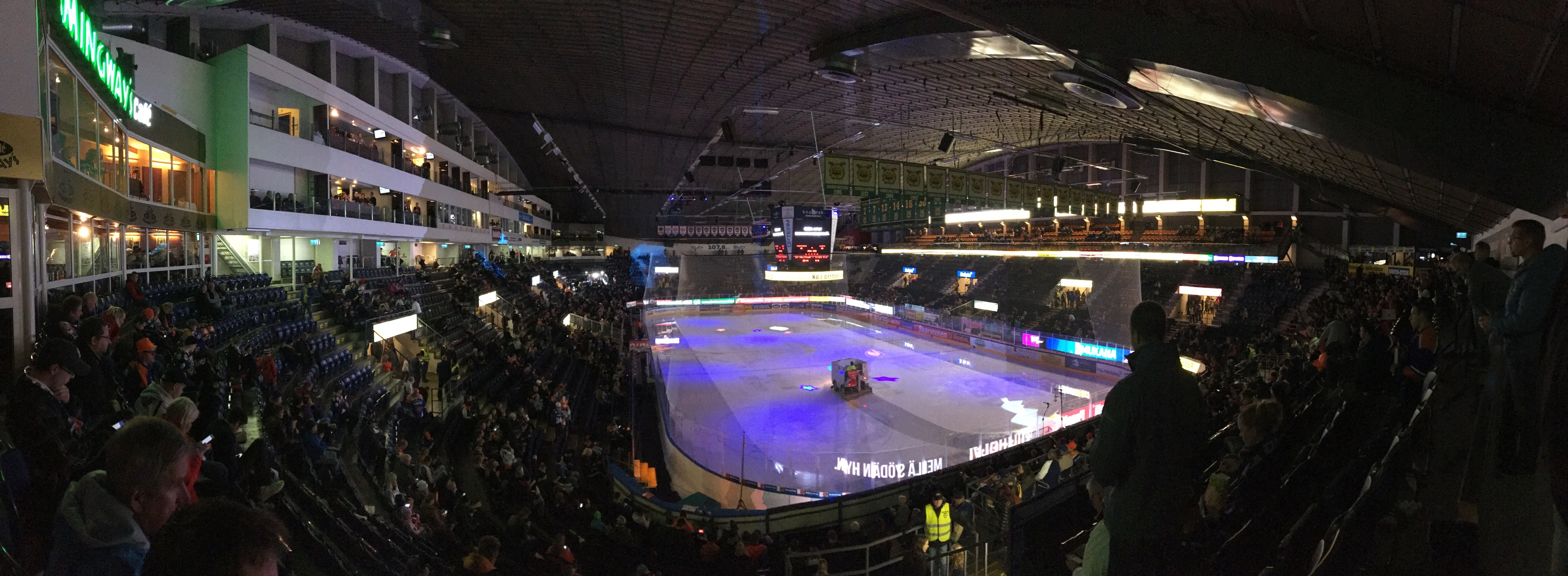
Panoramic view of Hakametsä hall

== Retired jerseys ==
=== Tappara ===
- 2: Kalevi Numminen
- 3: Pekka Marjamäki
- 7: Timo Jutila
- 8: Janne Ojanen
- 10: Timo Susi

=== Ilves ===
- 2: Jarmo Wasama
- 7: Aarne Honkavaara
- 13: Risto Jalo
- 14: Lasse Oksanen
- 16: Jorma Peltonen
- 30: Jukka Tammi
- 41: Raimo Helminen

=== Koovee ===
- 10: Heino Pulli

== See also ==
- 2021 Men's European Volleyball Championship
- Hakametsä (district)
- Nokia Arena, Tampere
