= Iidesjärvi =

Lake in the country of Finland

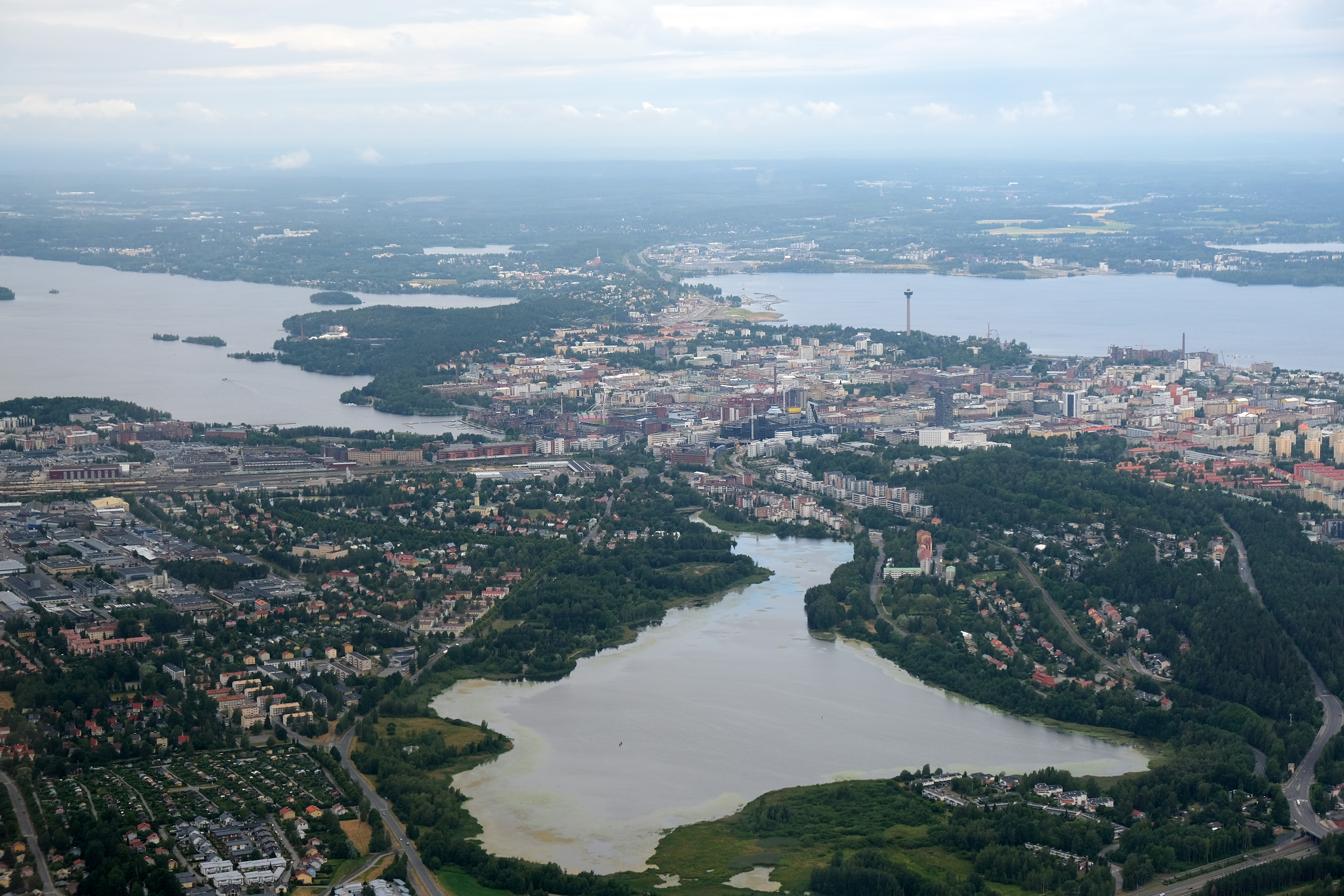
- Aerial view of Iidesjärvi

- Location within Finland
- Location: Iides, Tampere
- Coordinates: 61°29′10″N 23°48′20″E
- Primary inflows: Vuohenoja
- Primary outflows: Viinikanoja
- Basin countries: Finland
- Max. length: 1.9 km (1.2 mi)
- Max. width: 850 m (2,790 ft)
- Surface area: 0.6 km^{2} (0.23 sq mi)
- Max. depth: 3 m (9.8 ft)
- Surface elevation: 77.3 m (254 ft)

Iidesjärvi is a small lake in Tampere, Finland. It is situated southeast of the center of Tampere. It has a tower built for birdwatchers on its east end.
