= Nekala =

Neighborhood in Tampere, Finland

- Neighborhood
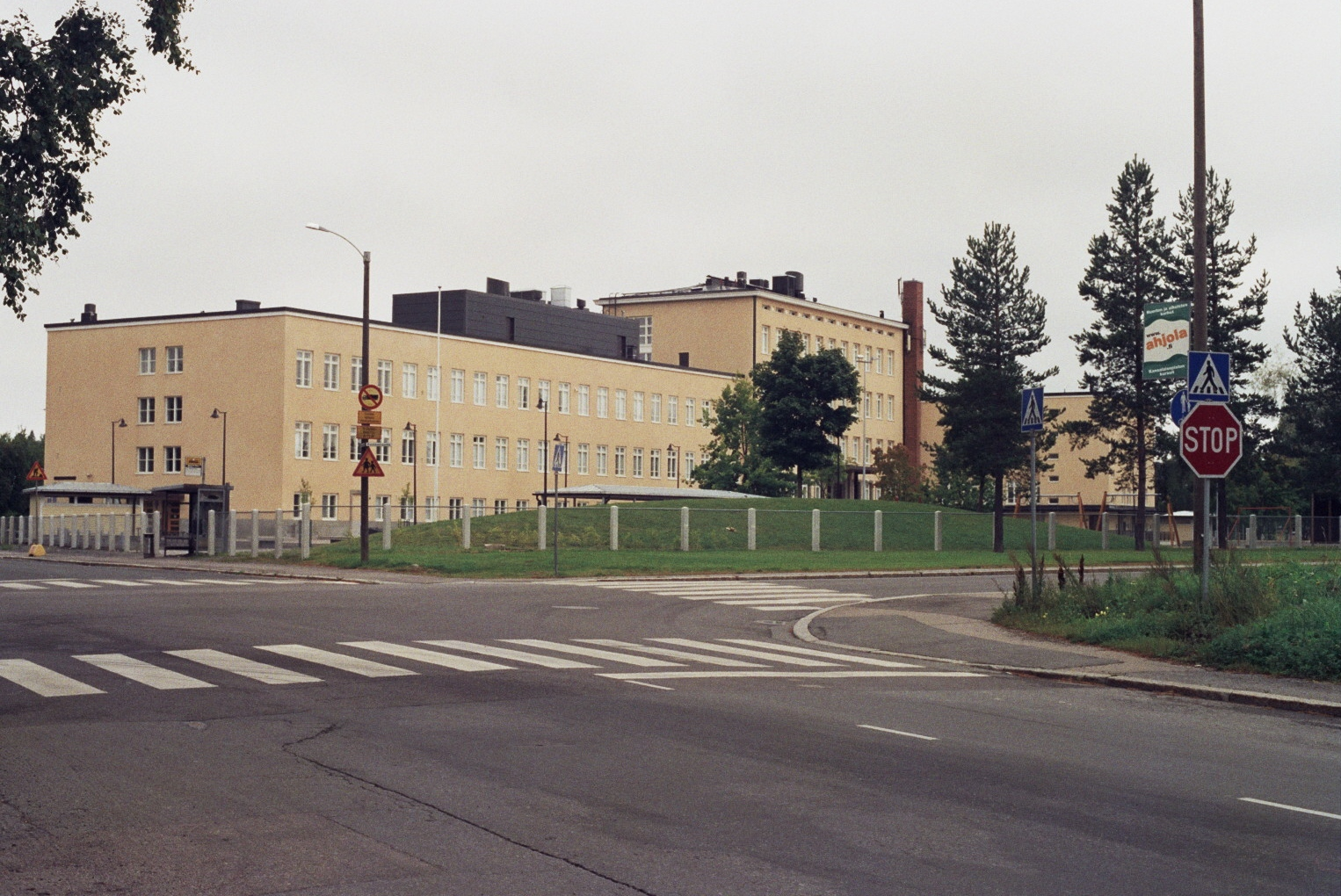
- Nekala School
- Interactive map of Nekala
- Coordinates: 60°29′1″N 23°47′35″E
- Country: Finland
- Historical province: Satakunta, Tavastia
- District: Tampere
- Elevation: 74 m (243 ft)

Population (2020)
  - Total: 1,051

Nekala is a neighbourhood in the district of Iides in the city of Tampere, Finland. The area has one of Finland's biggest allotment gardens.
