= Messukylä =

Former municipality of Finland, now part of Tampere

Coordinates: 61°29′07″N 023°50′41″E

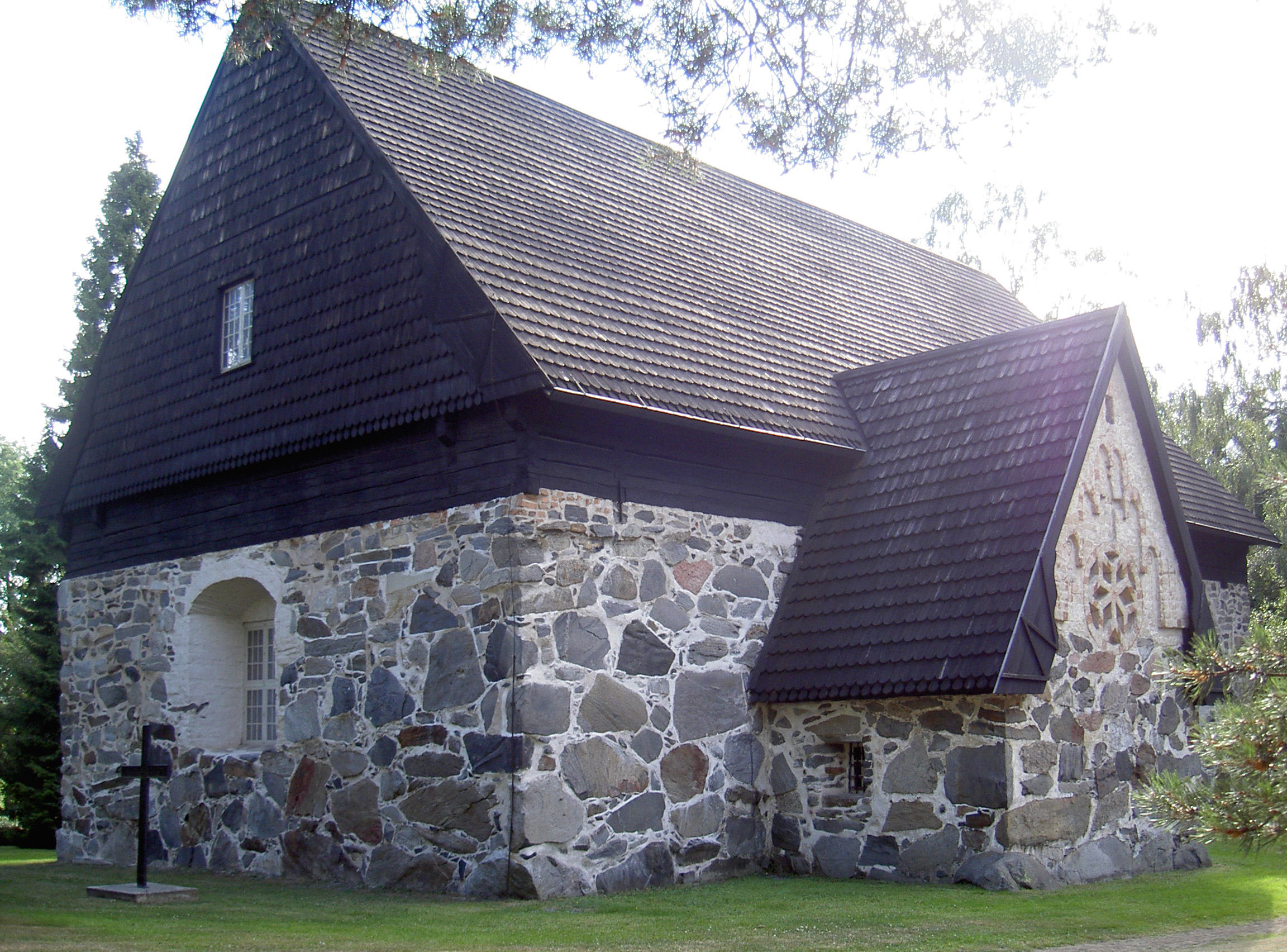
The Messukylä Old Church is the oldest building in Tampere.

Messukylä (Swedish: Messukylä, also Messuby) is a former municipality of Finland which was annexed by the city of Tampere in 1947. The medieval stone church (built c. 1540) in Messukylä is the oldest building in Tampere. During the Civil War (1918), Messukylä was the scene of heavy battles around both the medieval and new churches.

== History ==
Messukylä was first mentioned in 1439, when it was a part of Pirkkala. The village of Takahuhti is even older, its area has had permanent inhabitants before the 14th century. Messukylä became a separate parish in 1636, though it already had a chapel community in the 15th century.

Tampere, mentioned as early as 1666, was originally a part of Messukylä and was split off from it as a town in 1773. Teisko was a part of Messukylä until 1865, while Aitolahti was a part of Messukylä until 1923.

=== Areas added to Tampere ===
Kyttälä was a part of Messukylä until 1877. The area where Kaleva was later built was added to Tampere at the same time.

The areas surrounding the Hatanpää manor, including Nekala, Multisilta and Lakalaiva, were transferred from Messukylä to Tampere in 1920. The residential area of Rantaperkiö was later built near Hatanpää.

The rest of Messukylä was consolidated with Tampere in 1947.

== People born in Messukylä ==
- J.R. Aspelin (1842 – 1915)
- Heikki Lindroos (1865 – 1915)
- Penna Paunu (1868 – 1920)
- Kalle Suosalo (1869 – 1918)
- Frans Oskar Lilius (1871 – 1928)
- Antti Kaarne (1875 – 1924)
- Vilho Lehokas (1876 – 1918)
- Feliks Kellosalmi (1877 – 1939)
- Antti Linna (1916 – 2000)
- Tellervo M. Koivisto (1927 – 1982)
- Jorma Peltonen (1944 – 2010)
