= Subdivisions of Tampere =

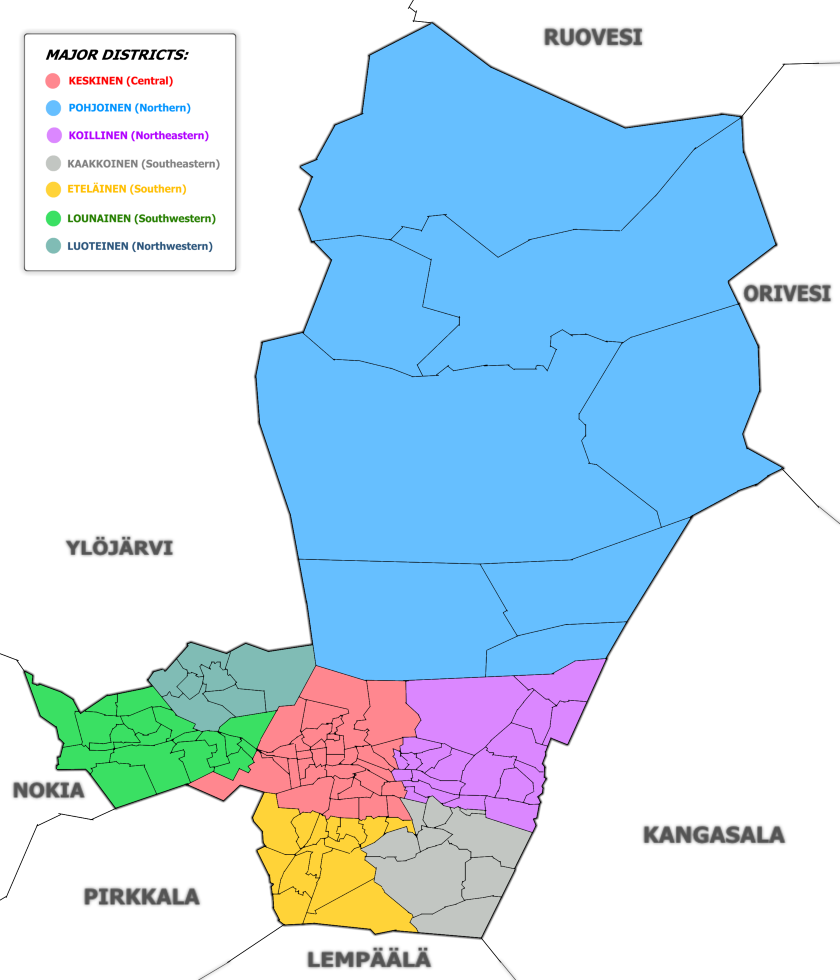
A major districts of Tampere

The city of Tampere, the second largest city and urban area of Finland after Helsinki, can be divided into various sorts of subdivisions. The subdivisions include neighbourhoods, districts, major districts and postal code areas. The plethora of different official ways to divide the city is a source of some confusion to the inhabitants, as different kinds of subdivisions often share similar or identical names.

== Districts ==
=== List of Tampere districts and quarters ===
- 1 Tampere central major district
  - Keskusta (Tampere Centre)
    - Finlayson
    - Nalkala
    - Amuri
    - Kaakinmaa
    - Pyynikinrinne
    - Särkänniemi
    - Tampella
    - Jussinkylä
    - Kyttälä
    - Ratina
    - Osmonmäki
    - Tammela
    - Tulli
    - Kalevanharju
    - Hatanpää
    - Pyynikki
  - Sampo
    - Kalevanrinne
    - Liisankallio
    - Petsamo
    - Lappi
    - Lapinniemi
    - Kaleva
    - Järvensivu
    - Vuohenoja
    - Kauppi
    - Kissanmaa
  - Iides
    - Viinikka
    - Nekala
    - Vihioja
    - Jokipohja
    - Muotiala
- 2 Tampere northeastern major district
  - Messu
    - Uusikylä
    - Ruotula
    - Huikas
    - Takahuhti
    - Hakametsä
    - Ristinarkku
    - Aakkula
    - Messukylä
    - Pappila
  - Tasa
    - Niihama
    - Atala
    - Ojala
    - Kumpula
    - Tasanne
    - Olkahinen
  - Leino
    - Linnainmaa
    - Leinola
    - Holvasti
    - Vehmainen
    - Hankkio
- 3 Tampere southeastern major district
  - Kauka
    - Turtola
    - Viiala
    - Haihara
    - Kaukajärvi
    - Lukonmäki
    - Hallila
  - Herva
    - Hervanta
    - Rusko
    - Hervantajärvi
- 4 Tampere southern major district
  - Härmä
    - Härmälä
    - Sarankulma
    - Rantaperkiö
  - Koivisto
    - Rautaharkko
    - Taatala
    - Koivistonkylä
    - Veisu
    - Korkinmäki
    - Nirva
  - Peltoo
    - Lakalaiva
    - Peltolammi
    - Multisilta
    - Vuores
    - Lahdesjärvi
- 5 Tampere southwestern major district
  - Pispala
    - Hyhky
    - Ylä-Pispala
    - Tahmela
    - Ala-Pispala
    - Santalahti
  - Raho
    - Epilä
    - Kaarila
    - Villilä
    - Kalkku
    - Rahola
  - Tesoma
    - Epilänharju
    - Tohloppi
    - Haukiluoma
    - Lamminpää
    - Myllypuro
    - Ikuri
    - Ristimäki
    - Tesomajärvi
- 6 Tampere northwestern major district
  - Liela
    - Lielahti
    - Pohtola
    - Lintulampi
    - Niemenranta
    - Ryydynpohja
  - Lentävä
    - Niemi
    - Lentävänniemi
- 7 Tampere northern major district
  - Aito
    - Nurmi
    - Sorila
    - Aitoniemi
  - Kämmen
    - Kämmenniemi
    - Viitapohja
  - Terä
    - Polso
    - Terälahti
    - Velaatta
- 8 Other Tampere district
  - Taraste
  - Hiedanranta

== See also ==
- Subdivisions of Helsinki

== Sources ==
- Tampere alueittain 2016 (in Finnish). Tampereen kaupunki. 2016.
- Tampereen väestö 31.12.2014 (PDF) (in Finnish). Tampereen kaupunki. 2015.
