= ACXJET =

Finnish commercial air operator

IATA	ICAO	Call sign
—	HCX	CITYCOPTER
- Founded: 2020; 6 years ago
- Commenced operations: 17 March 2022
- AOC #: FI.AOC.011
- Hubs: Helsinki Airport
- Secondary hubs: Tampere–Pirkkala Airport
- Parent company: Aerocom Oy
- Headquarters: Vantaa, Finland
- Key people: Ari Kallinen, Joonas Nurmi
- Website: www.acxjet.com

ACXJET is a Finnish commercial aviation company based at Helsinki Airport in Vantaa, Finland. The company operates private-jet and helicopter charter services, pilot training and bespoke travel management. It holds Finnish Air Operator Certificate FI.AOC.011 for aeroplane and helicopter operations.

== History ==
ACXJET was founded as Helsinki Citycopter, a private helicopter service founded, in Finland in 2020 by Ari Kallinen and Joonas Nurmi.

The company was launched during the COVID-19 pandemic, when restrictions on scheduled air travel created demand for flexible private aviation services. The legal entity operating the business, Aerocom Aviation Oy, was registered in Finland on 11 November 2021. The company subsequently expanded from helicopter charter into commercial air transport, flight training, business-jet operations and bespoke travel management.

In July 2021, Helsinki Citycopter entered the Finnair Plus partner network. In 2021, the company acquired two Airbus ACH130 corporate helicopters.

In March 2022, the company received its Air Operator Certificate. In May 2022, two ACH130 helicopters entered Finland and Helsinki Citycopter began replacing part of its conventional aviation fuel with Neste MY Sustainable Aviation Fuel.

In March 2023, ACXJET acquired Salpauslento / SL Flight Training and expanded into professional pilot training. In early 2024, the company acquired a Cessna Citation CJ4 and launched business-jet operations under the ACXJET brand. In 2024 ACXJET began offering ab-initio pilot-training through its SL Flight Training subsidiary.

For the 82nd Golden Globes in January 2025, ACX Access and Helsinki Citycopter were included in Golden Globes gift bag, offering a private flight and stay in Finland to see the northern lights.

In 2025, ACXJET added a second Cessna Citation CJ4-series business jet, a CJ4 Gen2 (HB-VJT). In September 2025, the company began using ACXJET as the primary umbrella name while retaining Helsinki Citycopter for helicopter services.

== Activities ==
ACXJET operates across private aviation, helicopter charter, pilot training and travel management. ACXJET provides business-jet charter. Salpauslento / SL Flight Training provides fixed-wing and helicopter pilot training, including ab-initio training.

- Helsinki Citycopter – helicopter charter, airport and city transfers, and sightseeing and experience flights, chiefly in Finland and the wider Nordic and Baltic region.
- ACXJET – business-jet charter, introduced with the company's first Cessna Citation CJ4 in 2024.
- ACX Access – travel management, including bespoke itineraries and ground arrangements.
- Salpauslento / SL Flight Training – fixed-wing and helicopter pilot training, from private pilot level through commercial and airline qualifications, including ab initio courses.

=== Fleet ===
Aerocom Aviation's operating fleet include five helicopters and two Cessna Citation CJ4-series business jets. The helicopter fleet include Airbus ACH130, H125 and EC120 types, with two ACH130 corporate helicopters added in 2022. The ACXJET fleet include Cessna Citation CJ4 and Cessna Citation CJ4 Gen2 registered HB-VJT.
