= Tampere Bus Station =

Bus station in Tampere, Finland

Coordinates: 61°29′36.9″N 23°46′09.2″E

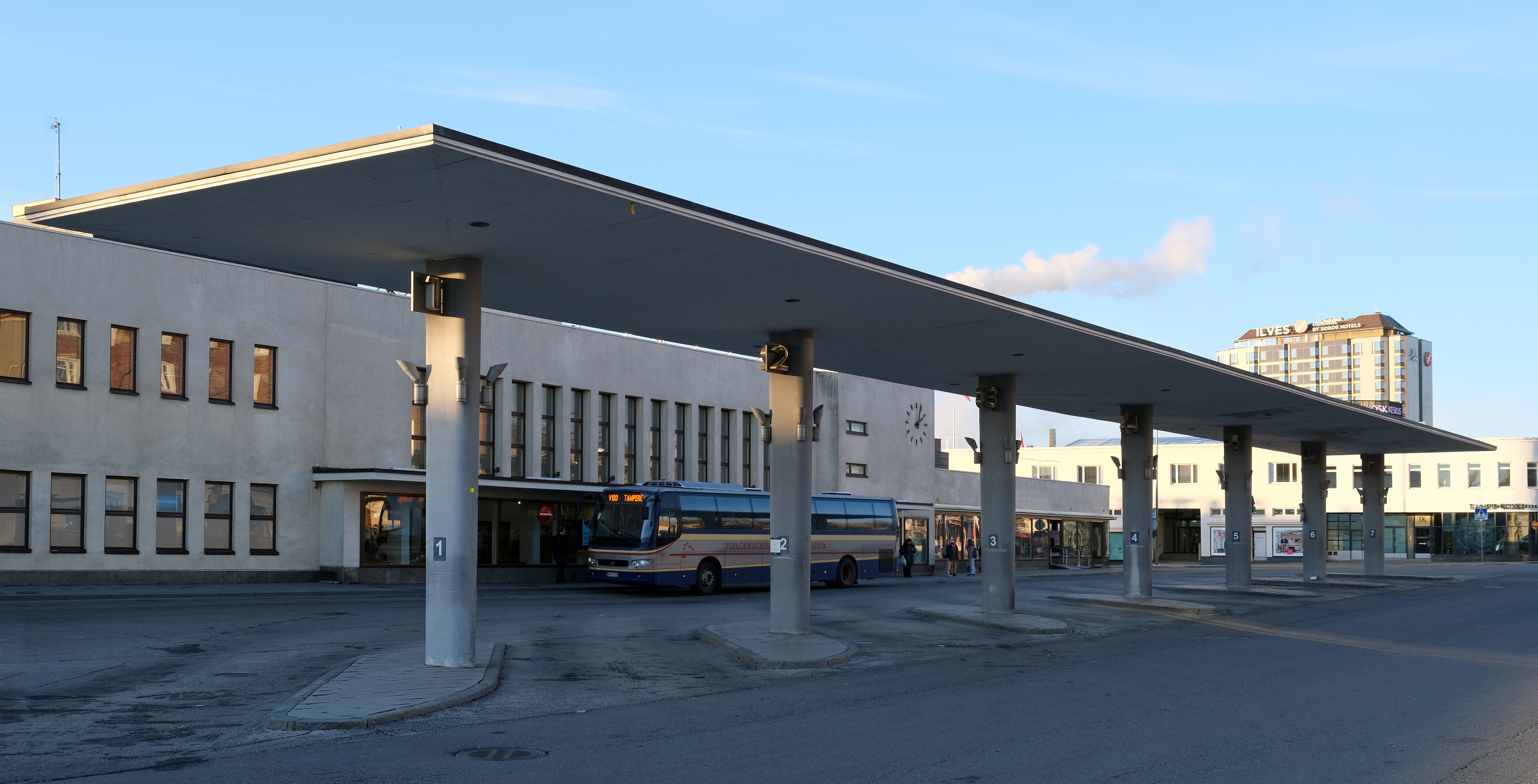
The bus station pictured in November 2021

The Tampere Bus Station (Finnish: Tampereen linja-autoasema) is a bus station in the city center of Tampere, Finland, located in the Ratina district along the Hatanpää Highway. It takes about 20 minutes by bus to Tampere Airport from the bus station. The bus station, designed by Jaakko Laaksovirta and Bertel Strömmer, representing functionalist architecture, was completed in 1938, and is now a protected cultural site as well as an architectural attraction. When completed, it was also the largest bus station in the Nordic countries.

The bus station was at its busiest in the late 1960s, with around 470 departures on normal weekdays. By the end of the 1980s, the number had shrunk to less than 400, mainly due to an increase in the car traffic, but also partly due to the relocation of some local routes to the Pyynikintori square. When the cargo handling facilities at the bus station had become cramped, a new freight station was built between the bus station and the Tampere Highway, which was opened in early 1985. The bus station also had the office of Länsilinjat Oy until 1984, when all the company's operations moved to new premises in the Sarankulma's industrial area.

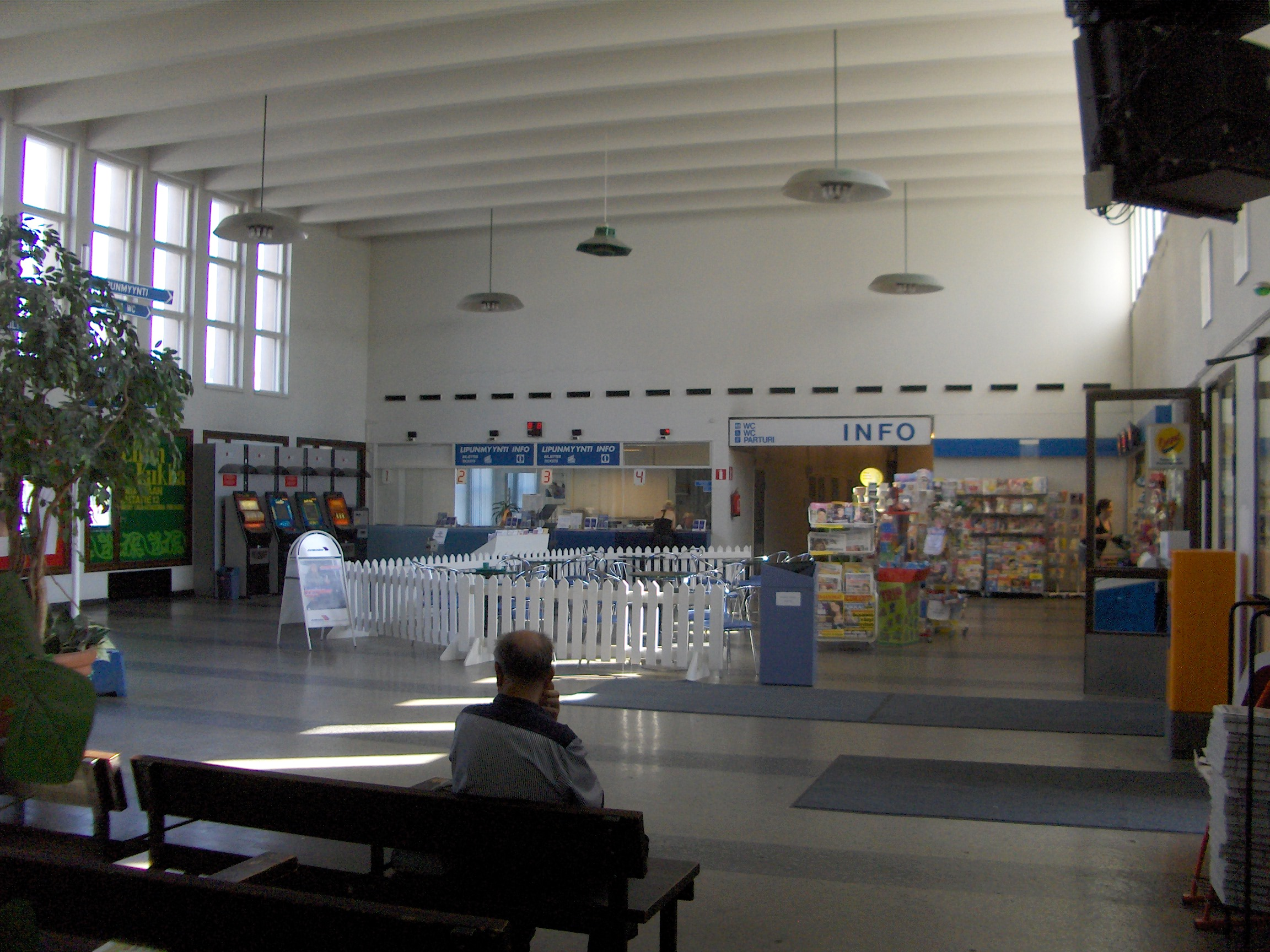
The interior hall of the bus station in August 2006

Between 1995 and 2004, the relocation of the bus station to the Central Station was examined in several stages in connection with the national transport hub project. The work also examined the model of a decentralized transport hub, where the bus station would remain in the Ratina district. On 31 May 2004, the City Council's planning department decided that the bus station would remain in its original location. A major renovation of the Tampere bus station began in December 2007, which lasted about a year, where the departure platforms were moved to the east of the station, and the parking spaces for buses were removed. The renovation was completed in late 2008, when the retail premises at the north end of the building were completed. The construction of the future Ratina shopping center was taken into account in the renovation and renovation work. The shopping center was built in 2015–2018 between Ratina Stadium and the bus station, and at the same time the Vuolteenkatu street, which passed through the shopping center site, was moved just behind the bus station. The bus station also provides direct access to the shopping center via escalators.

== See also ==
- Sori Square
- Tampere Railway Station
