= Teisko =

- Former municipality
- Teiskon kunta Teisko kommun
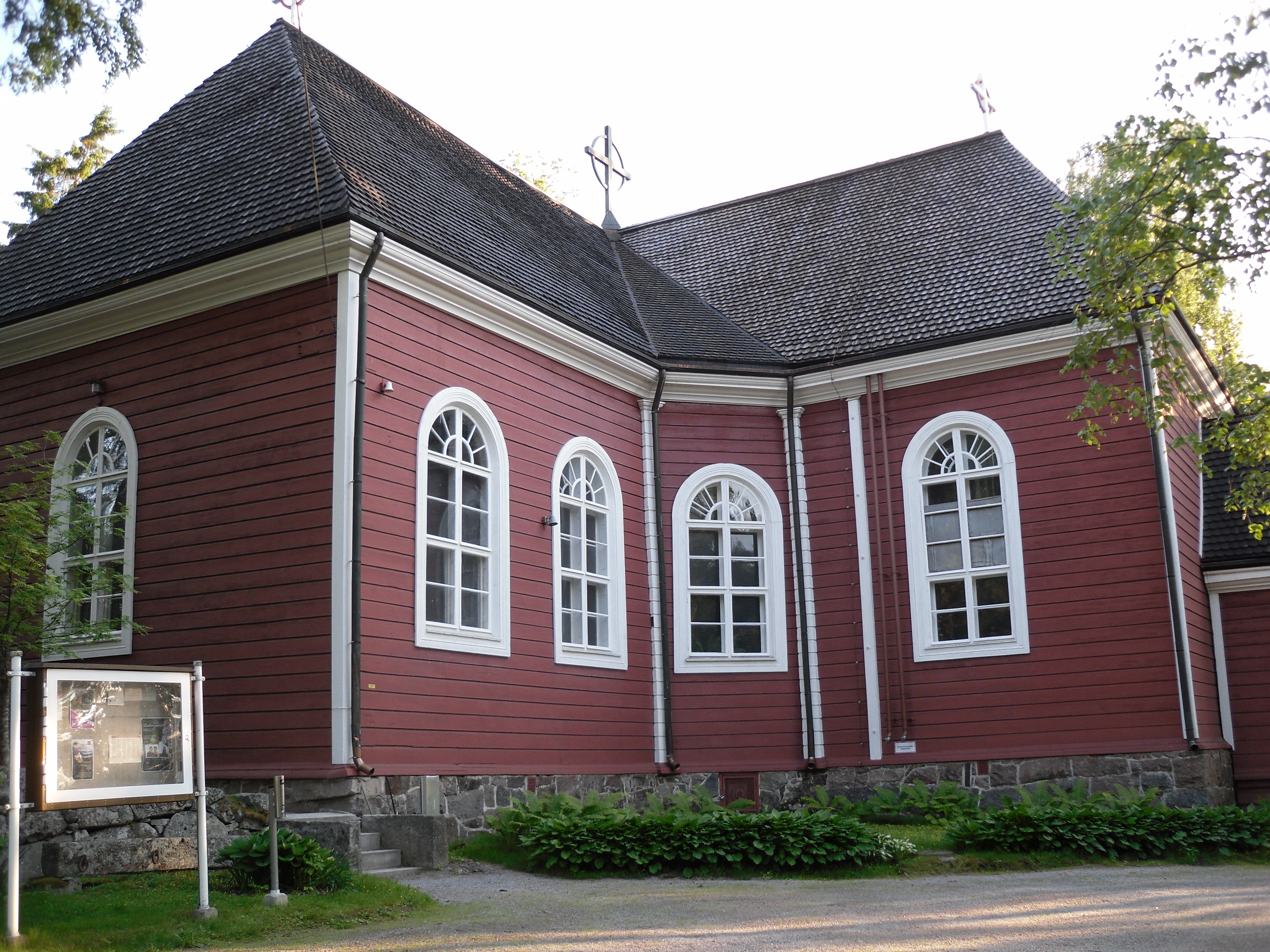
- Teisko Church

- Coat of arms
- Interactive map of Teisko
- Coordinates: 61°40′23.5″N 023°50′52.5″E
- Country: Finland
- Region: Pirkanmaa
- Parish: 1865
- Consolidated: 1972
- Seat: Kämmenniemi

Area
  - Land: 337.5 km^{2} (130.3 sq mi)

Population (December 31, 1971)
  - Total: 2,816
  - Density: 8.344/km^{2} (21.61/sq mi)
- Time zone: UTC+2 (EET)
  - Summer (DST): UTC+3 (EEST)
- Climate: Dfc

Teisko (Finnish pronunciation: [ˈtei̯sko]) is a former municipality in the Pirkanmaa region of Finland. It was consolidated in 1972 with Tampere, and at the same time Tampere got new districts: Kämmenniemi, Polso, Terälahti and Velaatta. Teisko's neighboring municipalities were Kangasala, Kuru, Orivesi, Ruovesi, Aitolahti and Ylöjärvi. Initially, the municipality comprised areas on both sides of Lake Näsijärvi, but in 1954, the areas west of Lake Näsijärvi were connected to Ylöjärvi and Kuru.

The landscape of Teisko alternates between high, often steep hills and deep, in some places gorge-like valleys. The most significant valley is the canyon formed by Kaitavesi, Paarlahti and Peräjärvi, which stretches almost 15 kilometers east of Lake Näsijärvi. In the northeast corner of the former municipality, the terrain rises to almost 200 meters above sea level and many of the hill peaks cross it. The largest of Teisko's numerous lakes is Lake Velaatta, which flows into Lake Näsijärvi's Terälahti. The shoreline of Lake Näsijärvi is very broken with its numerous bays and islands. Alongside the traditional rural settlement, a fairly large number of summer villas have risen since the 1950s.

Teisko is home to Teisko's Radio and Television Station (mast height 325 m) and Murikka College (Murikka-opisto), the Folk High School for Working Life. Teisko's attractions include Teisko Church, Teisko Museum, and the Velaatta Milk Platform Museum, which has been named the smallest museum in Europe.

The theme of Teisko's former coat of arms is mainly related to forging and the old home industry culture in general. The shape of the tie iron simultaneously refers to the first letter of the name of the municipality. The coat of arms was designed by Olof Eriksson and approved by the Teisko Municipal Council at its meeting on June 24, 1958. The coat of arms was approved for use by the Ministry of the Interior on October 1 of the same year.

In 2022, the districts formerly part of Teisko had a total population of 3,155.

== See also ==
- Aitolahti
- Messukylä
- Teisko Airfield
