= Viinikka (disambiguation) =

Viinikka is a district of Tampere, Finland

Viinikka may also refer to:

- Viinikka, district of Parkano, Finland
- Anssi Viinikka, Finnish rally rider
- Katri Viinikka (born 1965), Finnish diplomat
- Veijo Viinikka (born 1966), Finnish professional darts player
- Viinikka, the surname by the first marriage of Toto Fogelberg-Kaila (1924-2013), Finnish cartoonist
