= Teisko TV-mast =

Television mast in Kämmenniemi, Finland

Coordinates: 61°39′42″N 23°52′33″E

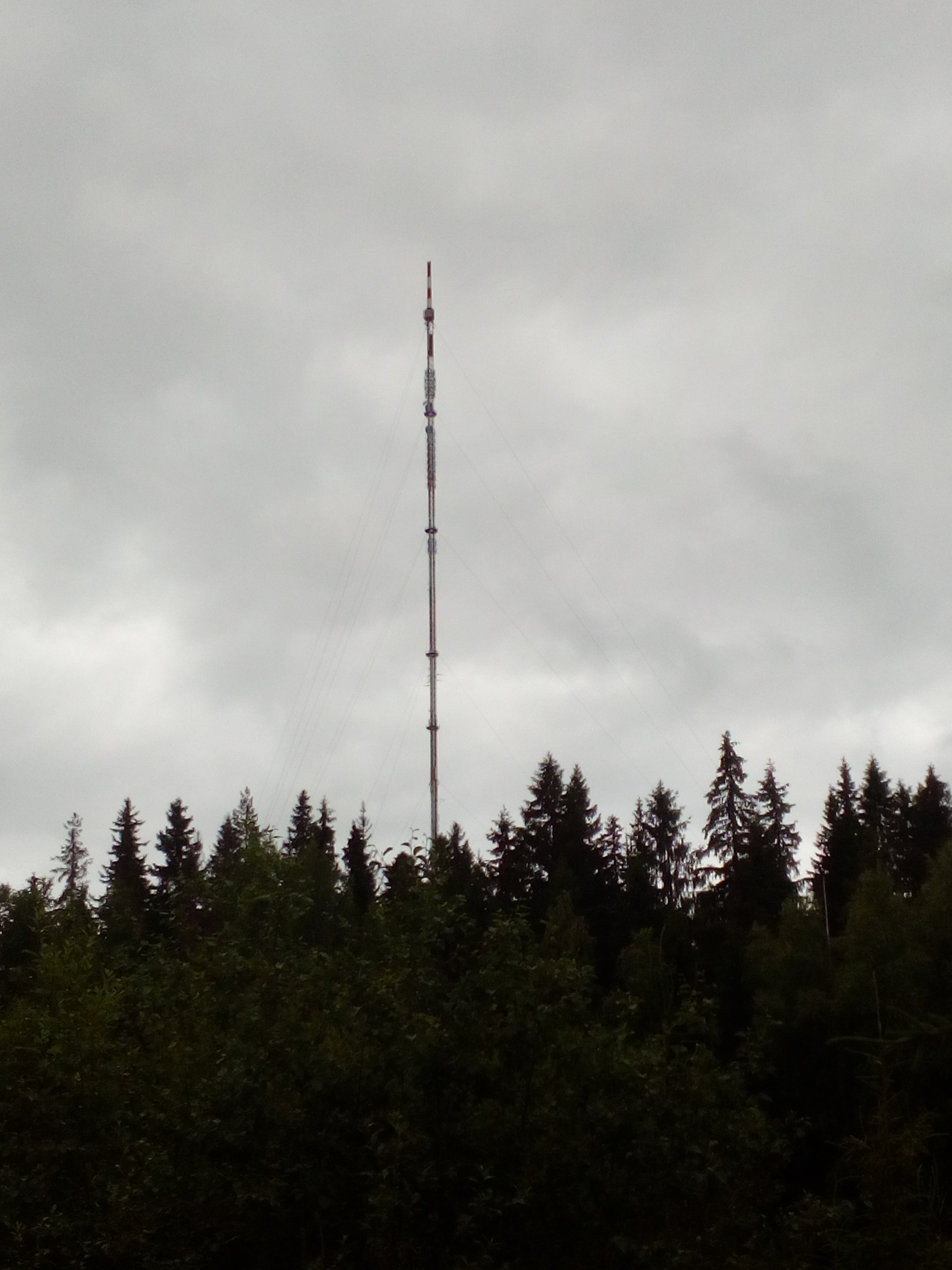
TV-mast in Kämmenniemi

Teisko TV-mast is a mast in Kämmenniemi, Tampere, Finland. It has a height of 325 metres (1066 feet), which makes it the highest structure in Tampere.

On 20 December 2025, a 15-year-old boy died after falling from the mast while descending. He had been climbing the mast with his two friends in order to film content for a TikTok challenge.

== See also ==
- List of tallest structures in Finland
- Teisko
