= Hankkio =

City district in Tampere, Finland

Coordinates: 61°28′47.79124″N 23°52′42.64291″E

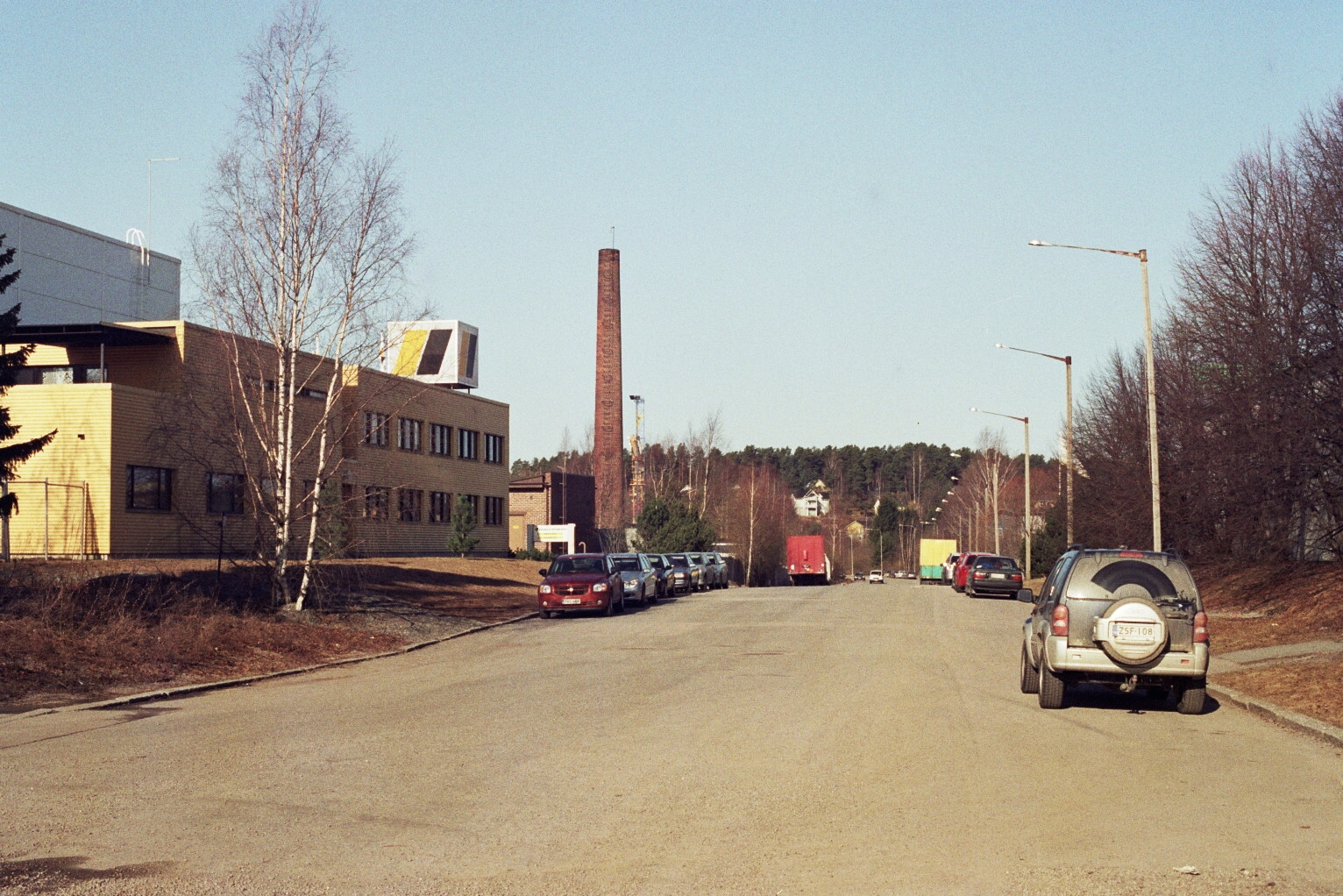
The Etu-Hankkion katu street in Hankkio

Hankkio is a district in Tampere, Finland, located in the eastern part of the city. The neighboring parts of the city are Messukylä, Ristinarkku, Linnainmaa, Vehmainen, Haihara, Kaukajärvi and Viiala. The Hankkio district is bordered on the south by the Kangasalantie road and on the north by the Tampere–Haapamäki railway.

The district is named after Hankkio farm, which was the former croft of the Messukylä's rectory. At one time there was a commercial garden on the farm. Hankkio moved to the city of Tampere in connection with the Messukylä municipal consolidation at the beginning of 1947. The district was zoned in 1960 as an industrial and residential area. Tampere's eastern bypass, completed in the 1990s, split the district and cut off Hankkionkatu, renaming parts of the Etu-Hankkion katu and Keski-Hankkion katu streets.
