= Teisko Airfield =

Teisko Airfield Teiskon lentokenttä
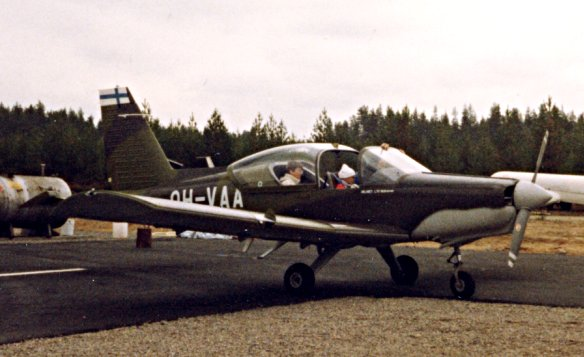
- Valmet L-70 Miltrainer at Teisko Airfield in 1983
- IATA: none; ICAO: EFTS

Summary
- Airport type: Public
- Owner: City of Tampere
- Operator: Tampereen Vauhtipuisto ry
- Location: Velaatta, Tampere, Finland
- Coordinates: 61°46′23″N 024°01′31″E

Map
- Location within Finland

Runways
Direction	Length		Surface
Direction	m	ft	Surface
05/23	1,200	3,937	Asphalt concrete

Teisko Airfield is an airfield in the Velaatta village (in the former municipality of Teisko) in Tampere, Finland. It is located about 51 kilometres (32 mi) northeast of city centre of Tampere. The airfield was completed in 1983, and it is owned by the City of Tampere and operated by Tampereen Vauhtipuisto ry. Gliding and motor gliding activities have been practiced in the field.

== See also ==
- List of airports in Finland
