= Paarlahti =

Bay in Tampere, Finland

Coordinates: 61°39′18″N 24°02′24″E

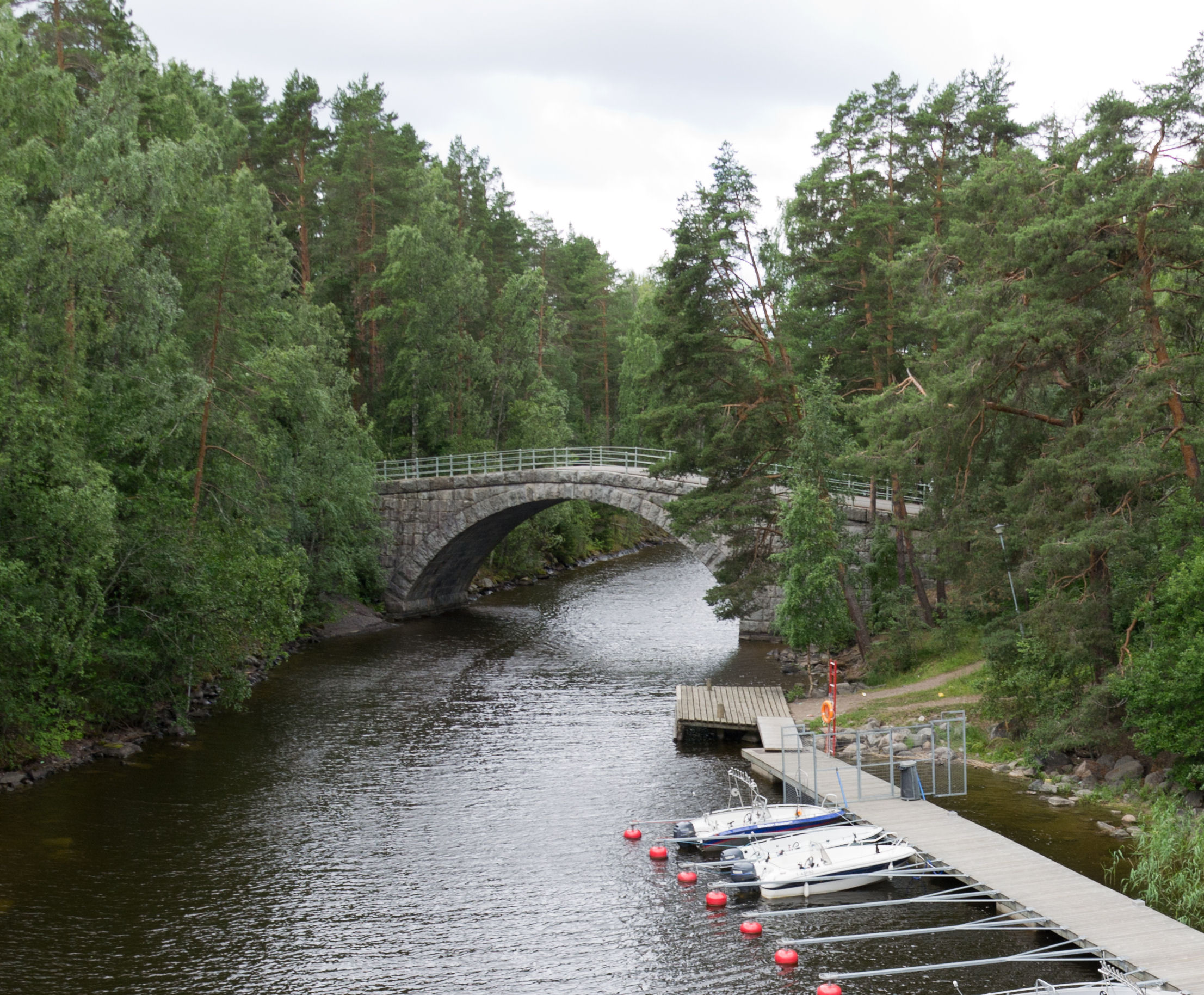
The Aunessilta bridge crosses Paarlahti in Kämmenniemi, Tampere

Paarlahti is a bay or inlet of the lake of Näsijärvi in the former Teisko municipality (now part of Tampere). Paarlahti is about 10 km long and has a maximum depth of about 60 m.

Paarlahti has been fancifully called the longest inland fjord of Scandinavia (though Finland is not part of Scandinavia, rather it is a Nordic Country), although it does not really resemble the large fjords of Norway. With its long and narrow shape, its depth and its steep shores it is seen as a fjord by non-geologists. Usually there are no islands in a fjord, but Paarlahti has a few. In Lake Inari in Finnish Lapland however, there are several bays that carry the word vuono (the Finnish word for fjord) in their names.
