= Aitolahti =

- Former municipality
- Aitolahden kunta Aitolahti kommun
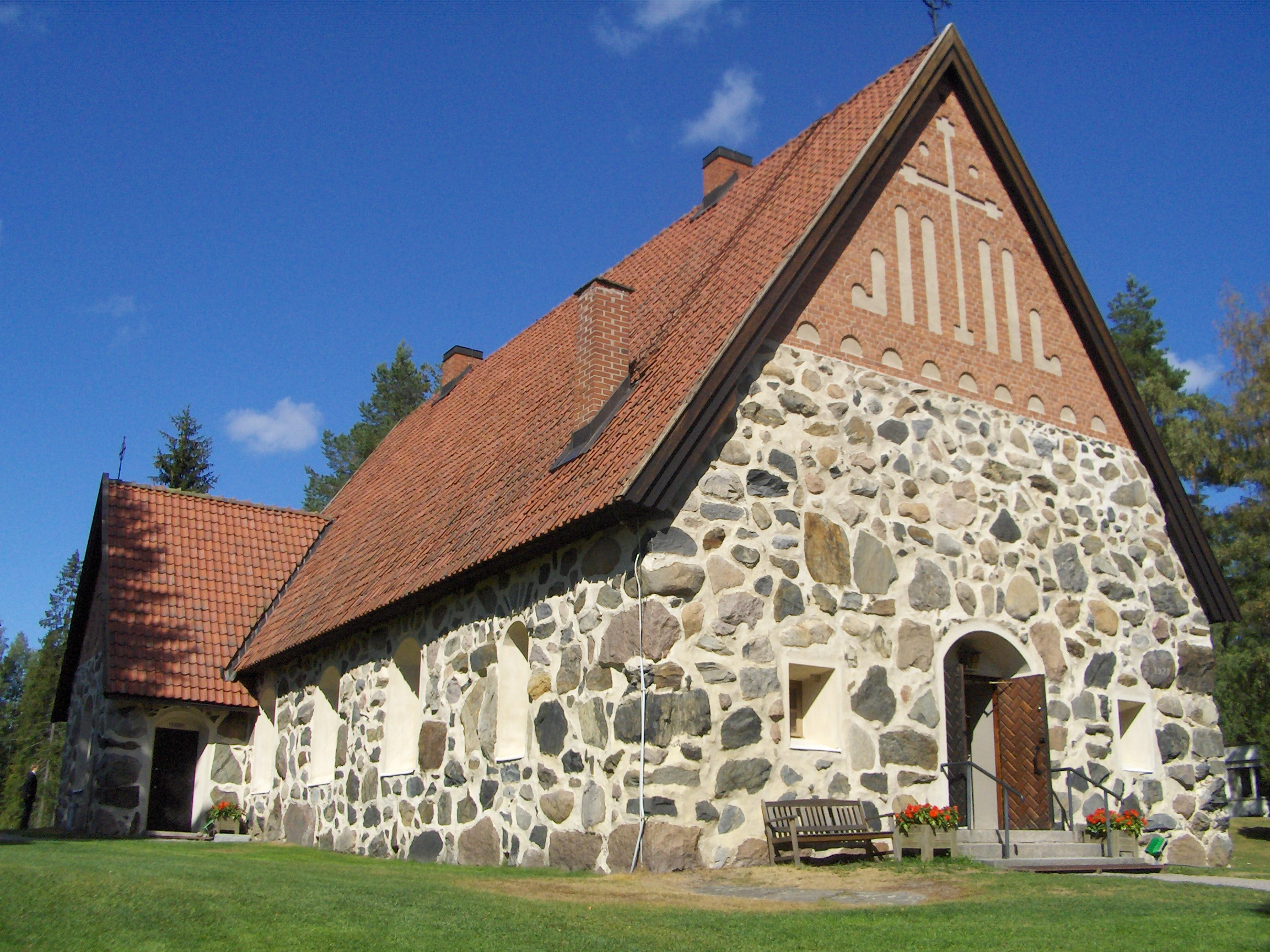
- Old Aitolahti Church

- Coat of arms
- Interactive map of Aitolahti
- Coordinates: 61°32′40.79″N 023°53′16.34″E
- Country: Finland
- Region: Pirkanmaa
- Parish: 1924
- Consolidated: 1966
- Seat: Sorila

Area
  - Land: 65.5 km^{2} (25.3 sq mi)

Population (December 31, 1965)
  - Total: 2,117
  - Density: 32.3/km^{2} (83.7/sq mi)
- Time zone: UTC+2 (EET)
  - Summer (DST): UTC+3 (EEST)
- Climate: Dfc

Aitolahti (Finnish pronunciation: [ˈɑi̯tolɑhti]; now forms the Tampere subdivision under the name Aito) is a former municipality in Pirkanmaa region, Finland. It was consolidated in 1966 with Tampere, and at the same time Tampere got new districts: Sorila, Nurmi and Aitoniemi. Until 1947, the neighboring municipalities of Aitolahti included Messukylä, which was consolidated with the city of Tampere. Highway 9 (E63) between Tampere and Jyväskylä and the regional road 338 between Tampere and Ruovesi pass through Aitolahti.

The old Aitolahti municipal center was Sorila. The densest population is in the southern parts of the region, in the districts of Olkahinen and Nurmi. The highest terrain in Aitolahti is Aitovuori, located near the border of Kangasala, extending 179 meters above sea level and more than 80 meters above Lake Näsijärvi. When the Aitolahti became independent parish after leaving Messukylä, there were only about 600 inhabitants, and the population grew very slowly for a long time, until growth accelerated in the 1950s.

At the end of the 19th century, the Finnish geologist J. J. Sederholm discovered oval-shaped depressions in the shore cliffs and rocks of Lake Näsijärvi, which he called Corycium enigmaticum, "enigmatic carbon bags". These are remnants of rudimentary microbial activity about two billion years ago and have been found in the rest of the world only in South Africa and Canada. The site was designated a nature reserve in 1962. These 2 to 30-centimeter-long "carbon bags" are also found on the opposite shore of Lake Näsijärvi on the Ylöjärvi side. These carbon bags also gave their subject in 1965, in the last year of the municipality's independence, the coat of arms of the municipality of Aitolahti, drawn by Gustaf von Numers.

In the 1980s, pork soup and barley groat porridge with buttermilk were named traditional dishes of Aitolahti parish.

== See also ==
- Teisko

== Sources ==
=== Further reading ===
- Juha Jaakkola: Tampereen Aitolahden ja Teiskon rakennuskulttuuri. Tampere, Esan Kirjapaino Oy, 2008. ISBN 978-951-609-389-8. (in Finnish)
