= Multisilta =

City district in Tampere, Finland

Coordinates: 61°26′24″N 23°45′04″E

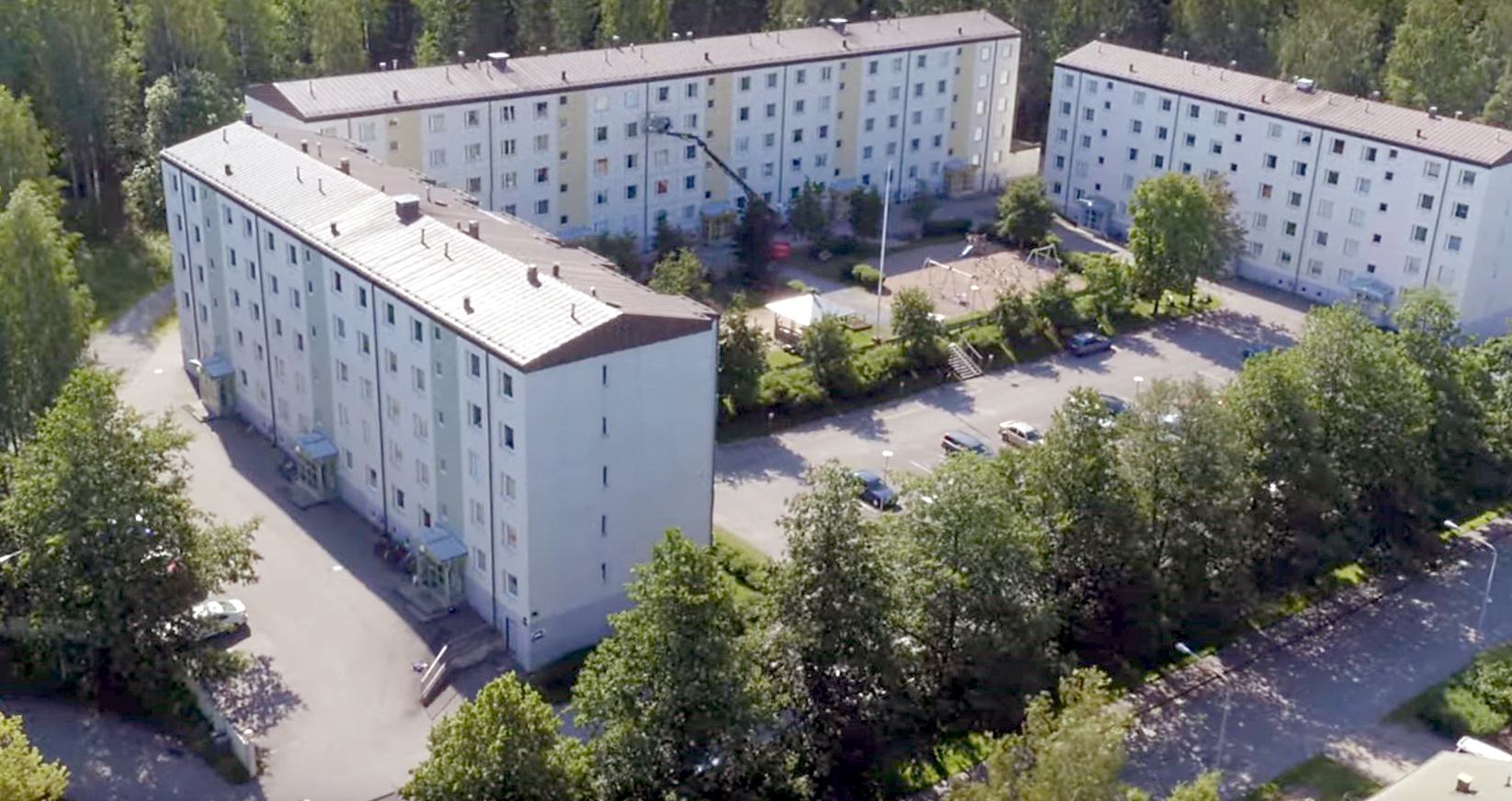
Apartment buildings in Multisilta

Multisilta (Finnish pronunciation: [ˈmult̪iˌs̠ilt̪ɑ]) is the southern suburb of Tampere, Finland, about eight kilometers from its city center. Multisilta was built from the late 1960s to the 1990s. The district has a population of about 3,000. In the center there is a pub, a grocery store, a youth center and a kebab pizzeria grill. There is a water tower to the north of the residential area. Multisilta borders the Peltolammi district in the north and the Vuores district in the east. In the south you will meet the Lempäälä border and in the west the Pirkkala border. To the east, the district is bordered by the end of Vuoreksenkatu and the Highway 3 (E12). Multisilta can be reached by public transport buses 15 and 50 in the Tampere region.

The district is named after the wooden bridge that once crossed Multioja. Multioja descends from Lake Sääksjärvi in the direction of Lake Pyhäjärvi. Multisilta's area once belonged to the lands of the Hatanpää Manor, which the city of Tampere bought in 1913. Like the neighboring district Peltolammi, Multisilta was originally zoned as a detached area and the first town plan was approved in 1950, but large-scale construction did not begin for one reason or another. A new apartment building plan was approved for the area in 1968. In 1932–1988, the Multisilta train stop was located on the Riihimäki–Tampere railway adjacent to the district.
