= Haihara =

City district in Tampere, Finland

Coordinates: 61°28′35″N 23°52′38″E

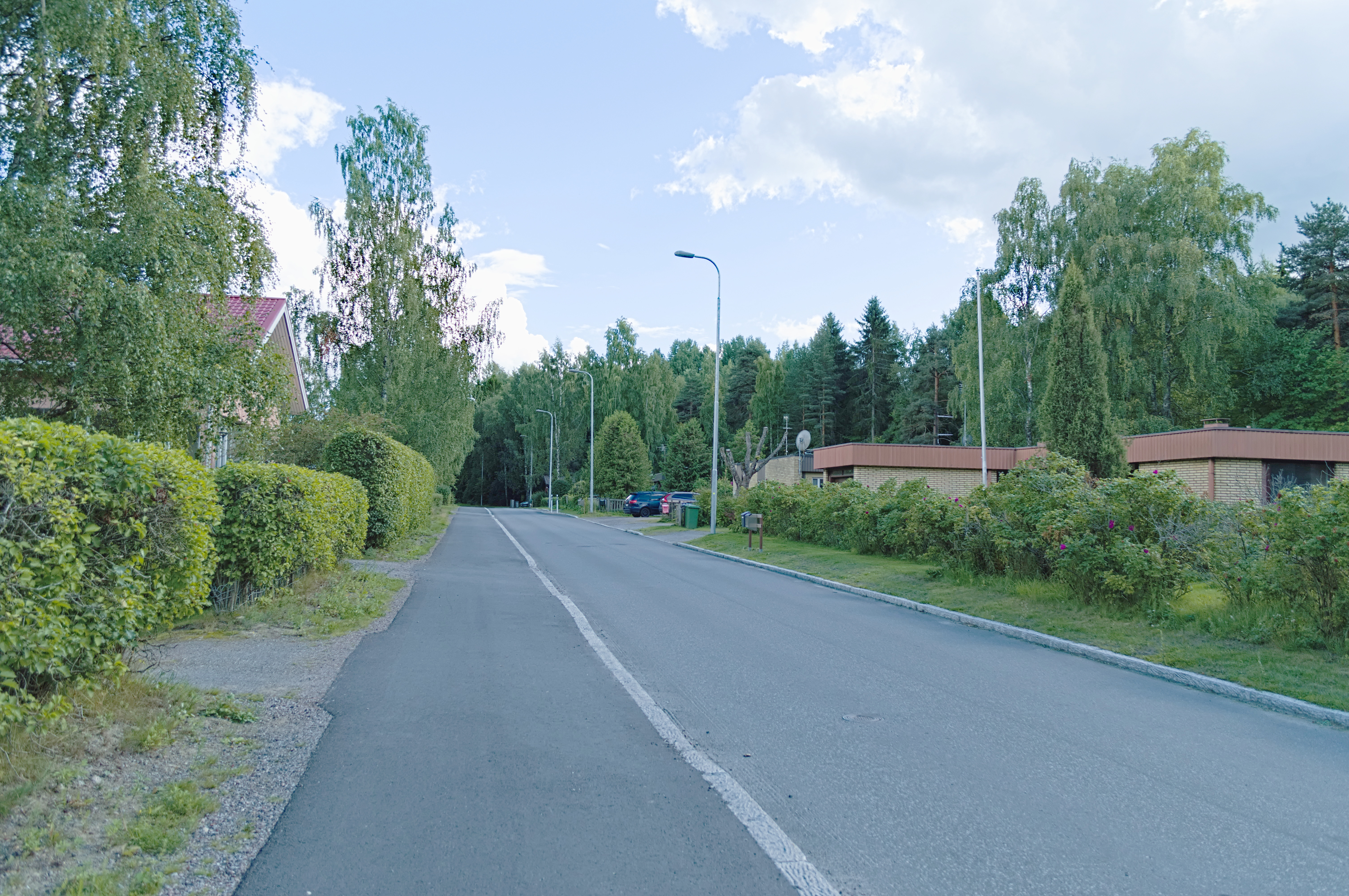
The Kirsikatu street crossing Haihara

Haihara (Finnish pronunciation: [ˈhɑi̯hɑrɑ]) is a small district in Tampere, Finland, located about seven kilometers from the city center. Haihara is bordered on the south by Kaukajärvi, on the west by Viiala and on the north by Hankkio. In 2014, Haihara had 199 inhabitants. After Kämmenniemi and Korkinmäki, Haihara had the relatively highest number of school-age children in the districts of Tampere in 2014. Despite being similarly named, the Haihara Manor and Haihara Art Center are not in Haihara, but are located on the Kaukajärvi side.
