= Sorila =

City district in Tampere, Finland

Coordinates: 61°33′19.98871″N 23°56′03.85436″E

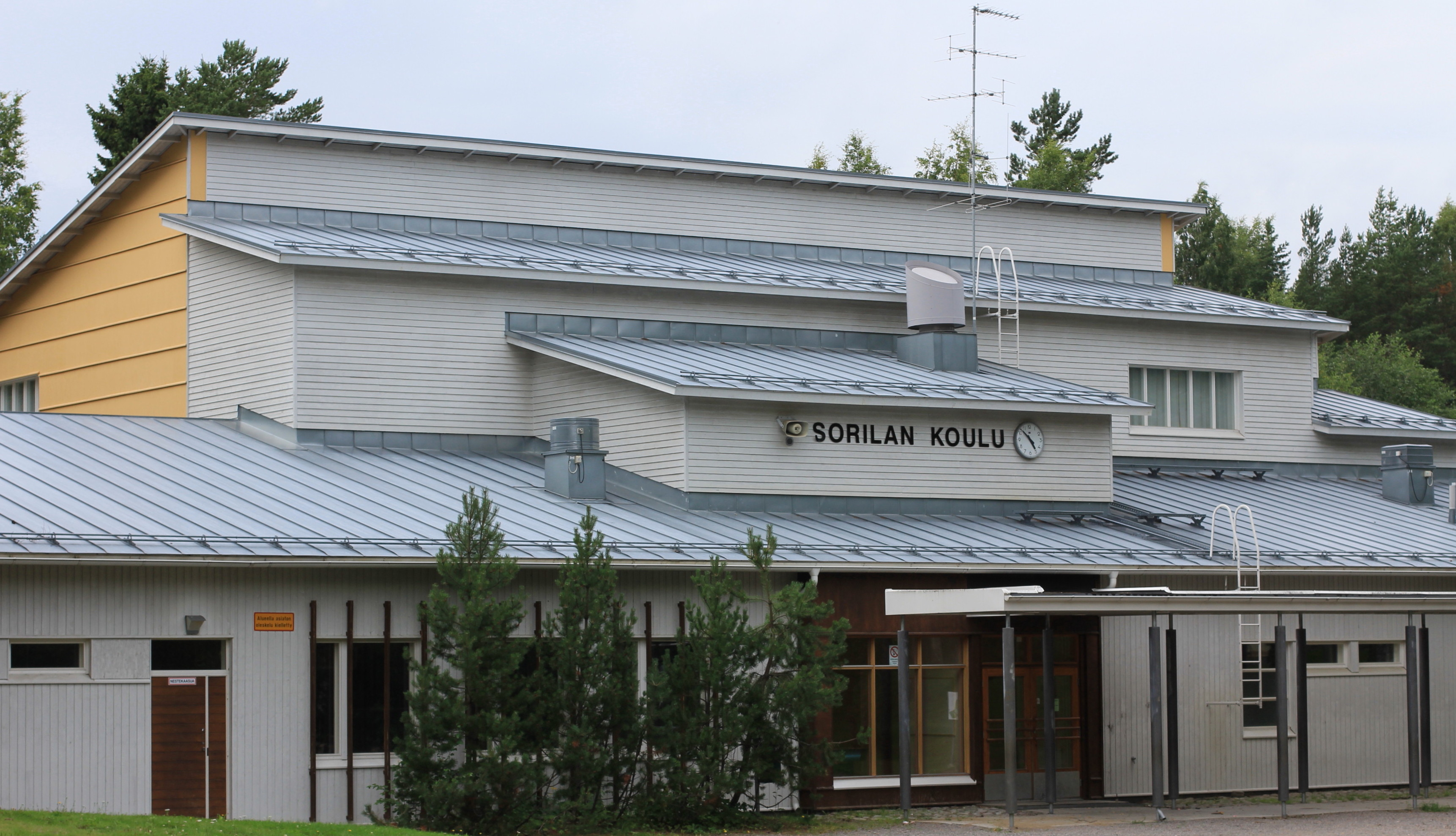
Sorila School

Sorila is a district in the northern part of Tampere, Finland. The neighboring parts of the city are Nurmi, Aitoniemi, Kämmenniemi and Viitapohja. In the district, there is the old municipal center of the former municipality of Aitolahti. Sorila also has another office of the Olkahinen School. There are detached houses in the area and it is located on the shores of Lake Näsijärvi, north of Highway 9 (E63). A road called Kaitavedentie to Kämmenniemi and Terälahti also runs through the area.
