= Viinikka =

City district in Tampere, Finland

Coordinates: 61°29′12″N 23°46′58″E

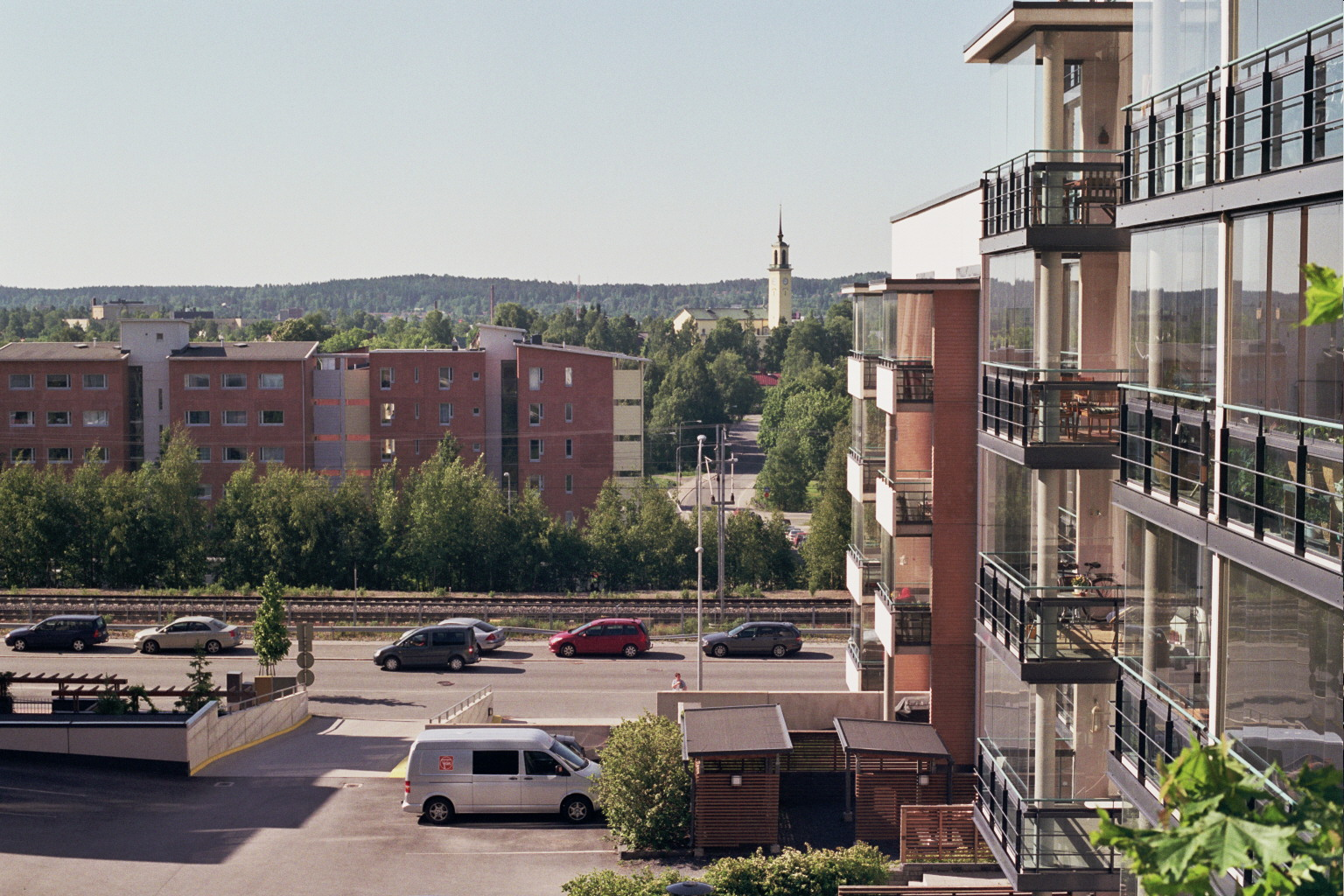
Viinikka's residential area close to the Kalevankangas cemetery in Tampere

Viinikka is a district of Tampere, Finland, located 1,5 kilometers southeast of its city center on the west side of Lake Iides. Its neighboring district is Nekala. Its construction began in 1914 on the former lands of Hatanpää Manor. The stone church, opened in 1932, is located in Viinikka.

Viinikka's main streets are Viinikankatu in a north–south direction and Kuokkamaantie in a west–east direction from Lempääläntie to Nekala. The original name of Viinikankatu in 1939–1956 was Hervannantie, but the name was considered misleading because Hervanta is located quite far from the Viinikka district. Before the major street name reform carried out in Tampere in 1936, the current Tuomiokirkonkatu in the center of Tampere was known as Viinikankatu. Ahlmanintie, on the east side of Viinikankatu, is named after Gabriel Ahlman (1737–1799), an assessor who owned the Hatanpää Manor in the late 18th century.

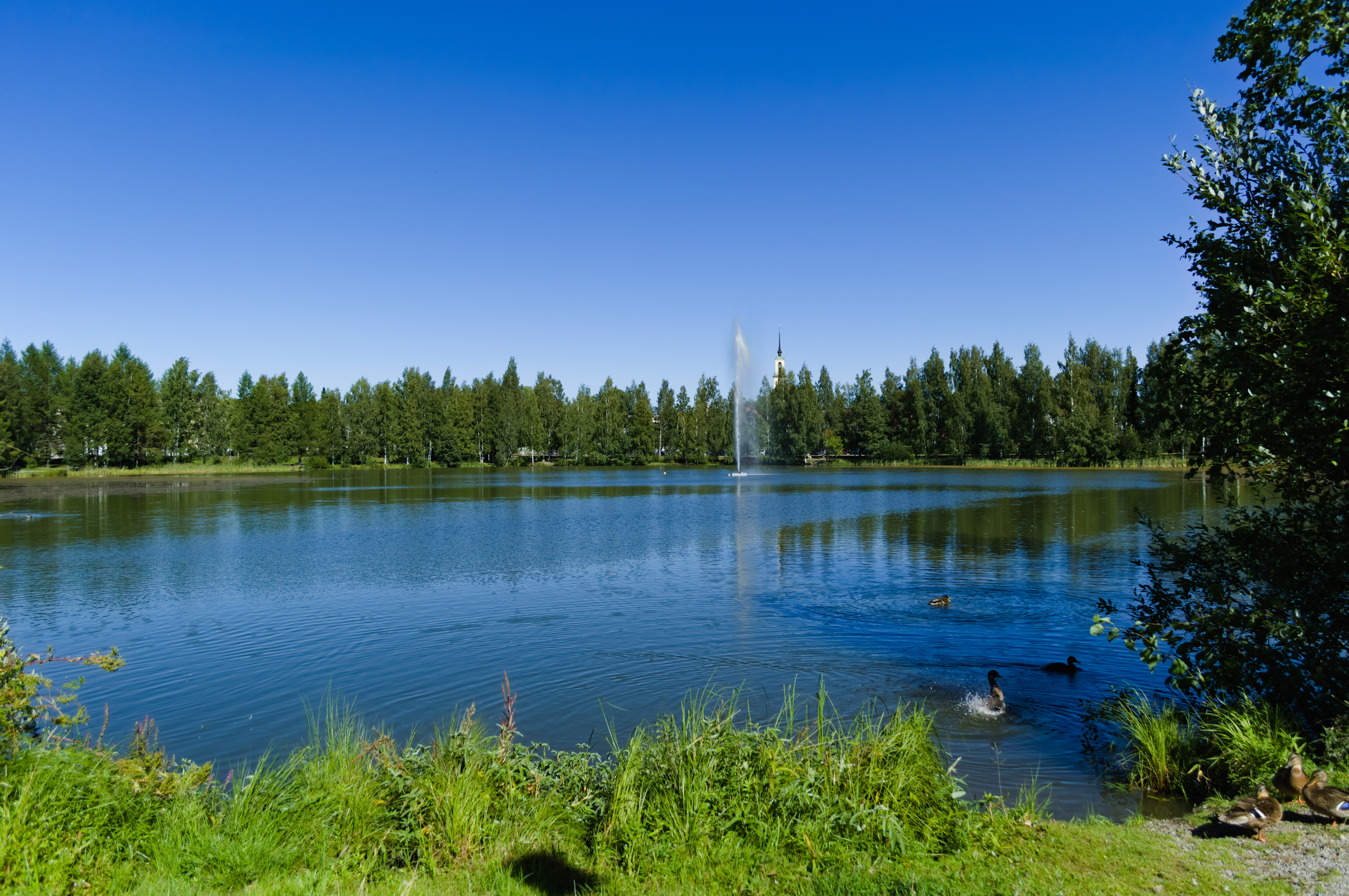
The Pahalampi pond

The land register of 1540 mentioned the village of Otavala, which belonged to Messukylä, where the houses of Otavala and Viinikka were located. The name Viinikka is thought to be of German origin. In 1757, Otavala passed to Hans Henrik Boije (1716–1781), the owner of the Hatanpää Manor and member of Parliament, who established a spinning school and a flax weaving mill on the farm. The school, called the “Otavalan spinni”, was designed to teach the handling of flax from sowing the seed to weaving the fabric. The spinning school, which had become a pawn of party politics at the time, was closed down after only a few years of operation, but it had time to pave the way for the flax mills established in Tampere in the 19th century. The Viinikka area was annexed to the city of Tampere after the Hatanpää Manor became the property of the city in 1913 and was reserved for a detached house. Viinikka's first town plan was approved in 1914, when the area was bounded on the north by Viinikanoja, on the east by Lake Iides and the Pahaoja pond, on the south by Pahalampi and on the west by the Riihimäki–Tampere railway. The town plans of the area were not finally approved until 1936–1954.
