= Nurmi (district) =

Statistical area of Tampere, Finland

Coordinates: 61°32′30″N 23°55′40″E

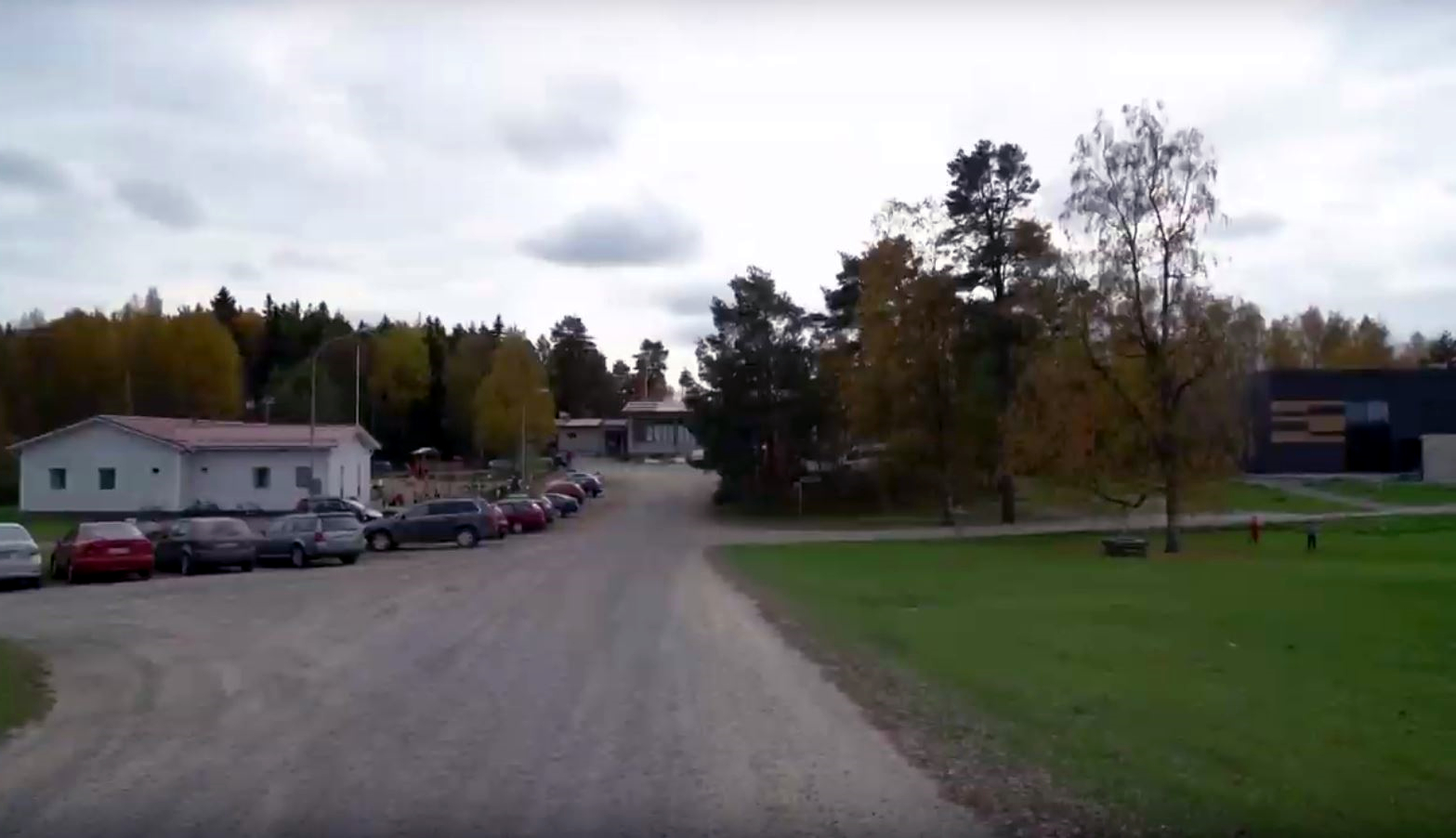
A kindergarten (left) and the Tampere Christian School in Nurmi

Nurmi is a statistical area of Tampere, Finland, located about ten kilometers northeast of the city center. Nurmi is bordered on the west by Lake Näsijärvi, on the east by the Kangasala town, on the south by Olkahinen and on the north by Sorila and Aitoniemi. At the end of 2014, Nurmi had 360 inhabitants. Until 1965, Nurmi belonged to the municipality of Aitolahti before the municipality was incorporated into Tampere. Initially, Nurmi also formed its own urban area, but today it has merged into the Tampere urban area.

The Tampere Christian School is located in Nurmi. It operates on a co-Christian basis and is maintained by the Adventist Church of Finland, offering free basic education based on Christian basic values and outlook on life for all grades of primary school.
