= Leinola =

City district in Tampere, Finland

Coordinates: 61°29′04.74054″N 23°54′19.97003″E

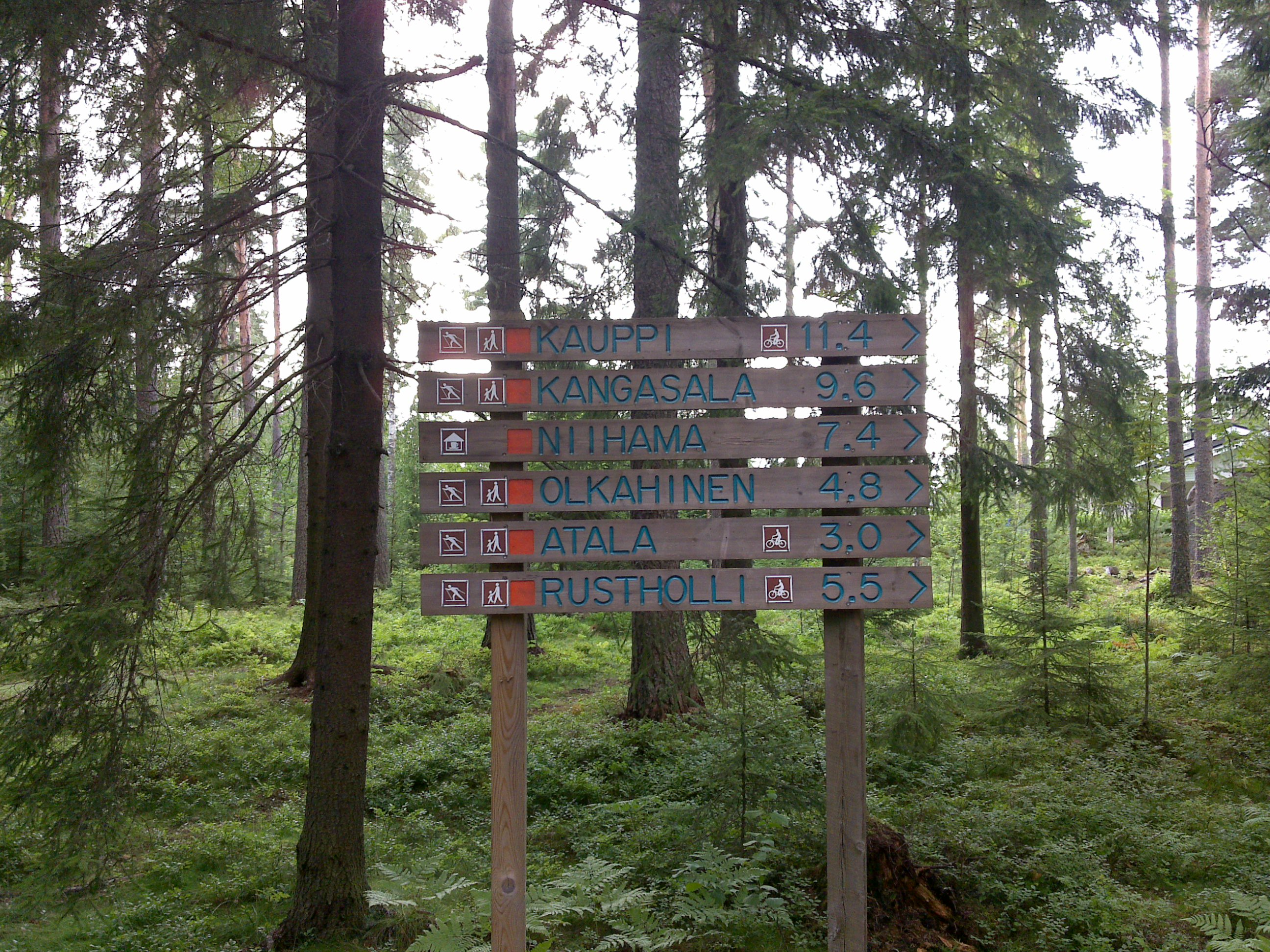
Trail signs in Leinola

Leinola is a district in the eastern part of Tampere, Finland. The neighboring parts of the city are Linnainmaa and Holvasti. Leinola School is located in the Leinola district. The area is served by bus lines 1, 8 and 38 of the Tampere City Transport. The southern boundary of the district is the Tampere–Haapamäki railway. There is also a statue of Marshal Mannerheim in Leinola.

Leinola was mentioned in the 1540 land register as a village belonging to the parish of Messukylä, with five houses. The owner of three of these houses had the same nickname Leinoij in the 1553 land register. Messukylä was annexed to the city of Tampere in 1947, and the first town plan for the Leinola area was confirmed in 1952.

The area's street names includes both Kalevala-themed and canine-themed nomenclatures, the latter based on the old place called Koiramäki ("dog hill"). Instead, the street names Lukinkatu, Mikkolankatu and Vestonkatu refer to old main buildings of the historical village. The name of Karjumäenkatu is based on Karjumäki ("boar hill"), located north of the street, which was once used as a pig pasture. The Pulkkisenkatu and Pulkkisenraitti are both named after Pulkkisenmäki, and the Pulkkinen's smokehouse is remembered as the last in the area.
