= Pohtola =

City district in Tampere, Finland

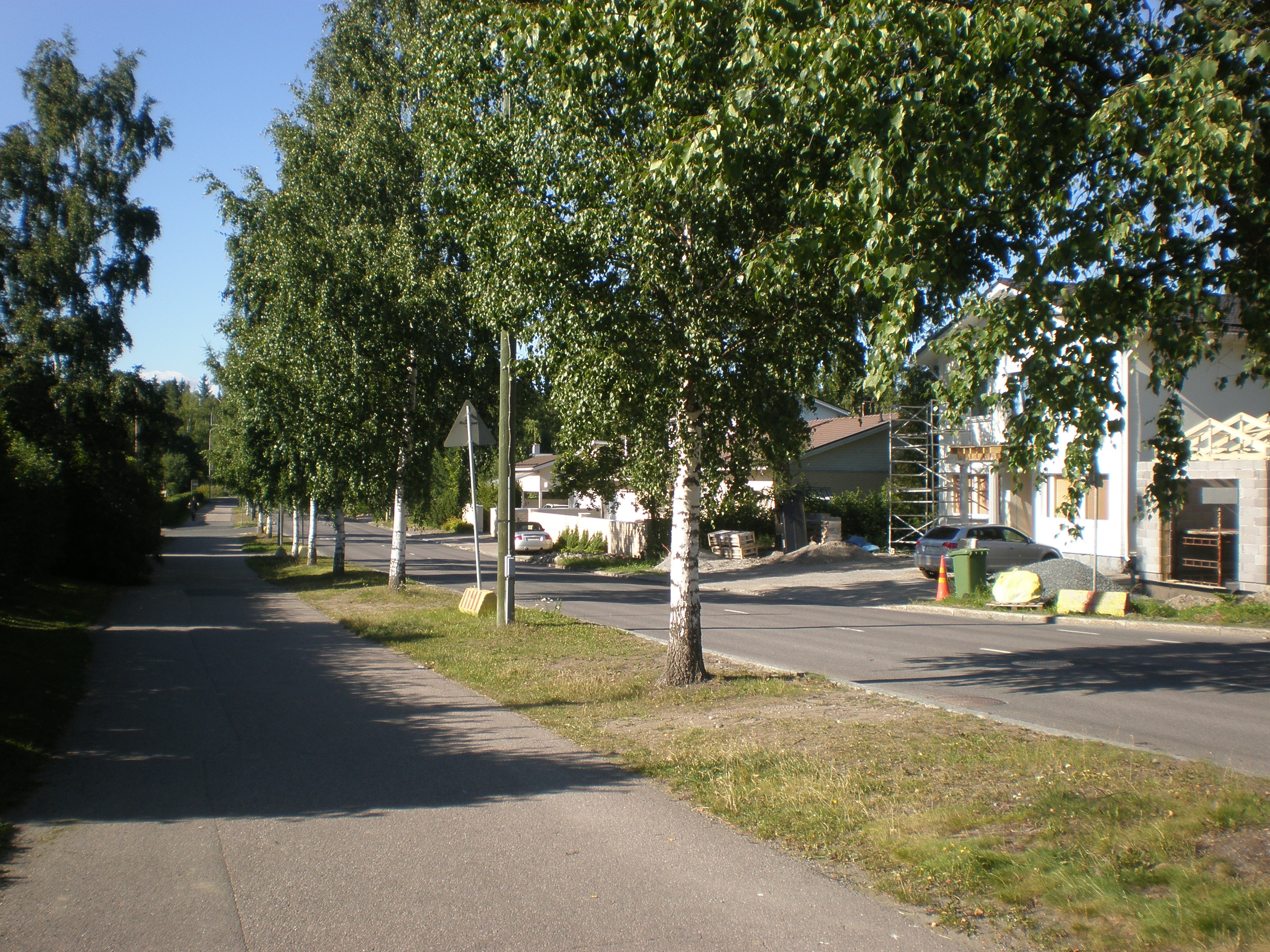
Pohtolankatu street in Pohtola

Pohtola is one of the western districts of Tampere, Finland, located near the Ylöjärvi town. The neighboring parts of the district are Ryydynpohja, Lintulampi, Niemi and Lentävänniemi. The nearest school is Lielahti School in Lintulampi.

The name of the district is based on the house and village of the same name. There was only one farm in the village of Pohtola in the 1550s, the owner of which was mentioned in the documents as Niisius Pohtola. Pohtola was moved from the municipality of Ylöjärvi to the city of Tampere at the beginning of 1950, along with the entire Lielahti area. The first city plan of area was completed at the northernmost tip of the area in 1955 and the entire district was zoned in 1964.

The main street in the district is Pohtolankatu, which leads from Lielahti to Ylöjärvi's Siivikkala. The street crosses the city border along the Pohtosilta bridge of Pohtosalmi.
