= Tampere–Pirkkala Airport =

Tampere–Pirkkala Airport Tampere-Pirkkalan lentoasema

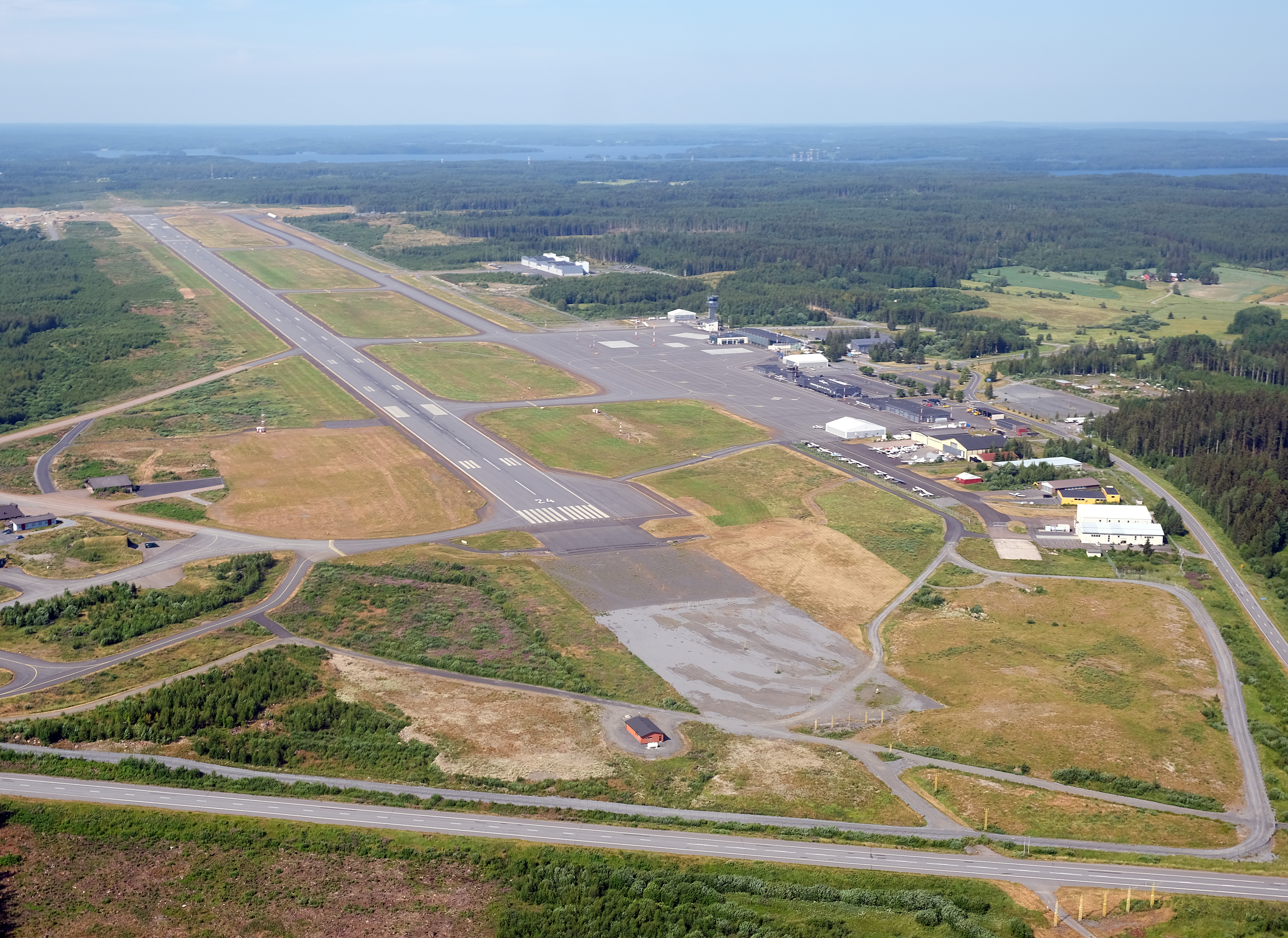
- IATA: TMP; ICAO: EFTP

Summary
- Airport type: Public/Military
- Operator: Finavia
- Serves: Tampere, Pirkkala, Finland
- Hub for: airBaltic
- Elevation AMSL: 119 m (390 ft)
- Coordinates: 61°24′55″N 023°35′16″E
- Website: finavia.fi

Map
- Location within Finland

Runways
Direction	Length		Surface
Direction	m	ft	Surface
06/24	2,700	8,858	Asphalt

Statistics (2022)
- Passengers: 168,328
- Landings: 1,383
- Source: AIP Finland

Tampere–Pirkkala Airport (IATA: TMP, ICAO: EFTP; Finnish: Tampere-Pirkkalan lentoasema, Swedish: Tammerfors-Birkala flygplats), or simply Tampere Airport, is located in Pirkkala, Finland, 7 nautical miles (13 kilometres; 8.1 miles) south-west of Tampere city centre. The airport is the sixth-busiest airport in Finland, as measured by the total number of passengers (168,328 in 2022), and the third-busiest as measured by the number of international passengers (159,801 in 2022).

== History ==
=== Foundation and early years ===
Tampere Airport was founded in 1936 in Härmälä neighbourhood, located 6 kilometres (3.7 mi) from the centre of Tampere. At that time the airport was connected to Helsinki, Vaasa, Oulu and Kemi by Aero O/Y (now Finnair). The first terminal building was built in 1941. Karhumäki Airways began to fly to Stockholm in the 1950s. The runway was paved in 1958. Between 1936 and 1979 Härmälä airport served 1.5 million passengers. In 1979, Härmälä airport was closed and the new Tampere–Pirkkala Airport was opened.

The current terminal 1 building was completed in 1996. Ryanair started flights to Tampere–Pirkkala in April 2003. Its first destinations were Stockholm-Skavsta, London-Stansted, Frankfurt-Hahn and Riga. This made the airport one of Finland's fastest-growing airports and increased its annual passenger numbers from 256,380 to 709,356 between 2000 and 2008.

=== Development since 2010 ===
In 2011, Ryanair had 13 destinations from Tampere–Pirkkala. Wizz Air flew to Gdańsk during summers 2010 and 2011. airBaltic resumed flights to Riga in March 2017.

The low-cost airline terminal 2 was renovated in 2014–2015. However, in April 2015, Ryanair announced that it would cancel all the routes from Tampere for the winter season 2015–16 due to a plane shortage. Then, only routes to Bremen and Budapest resumed in spring 2016.

In June 2021, Ryanair announced a twice-weekly route from Tampere to London-Stansted for the winter season 2021–22. On 14 December 2021, airBaltic announced that its first secondary hub outside of the Baltic countries would be established in Tampere Airport in May 2022. In March 2023, Finnair announced it would end flights between Tampere and Helsinki Airport and replace them with bus service due to low demand and the short distance. Ryanair ended its London-Stansted route in late 2023. In October 2026, Finnair resumed flights to Helsinki, with a daily overnight flight and a stop in Tampere on its afternoon flight from Oulu to Helsinki.

== Airlines and destinations ==
The following airlines operate regular scheduled and charter flights at Tampere–Pirkkala Airport:

Airlines	Destinations
Aegean Airlines	Seasonal: Rhodes
airBaltic	Málaga, Riga; Seasonal: Gran Canaria
Finnair	Helsinki, Oulu (Note: Finnair's afternoon flight from Oulu to Helsinki stops in Tampere. The service runs in that direction only, so there is no flight from Tampere to Oulu.)
Jettime	Seasonal charter: Gran Canaria

== Military usage ==
The airport is also home to the Satakunta Air Command base of the Finnish Air Force. F-18 Hornets were stationed at Tampere-Pirkkala airport until the middle of 2014 when the 21st Fighter Squadron was dissolved.

== Statistics ==
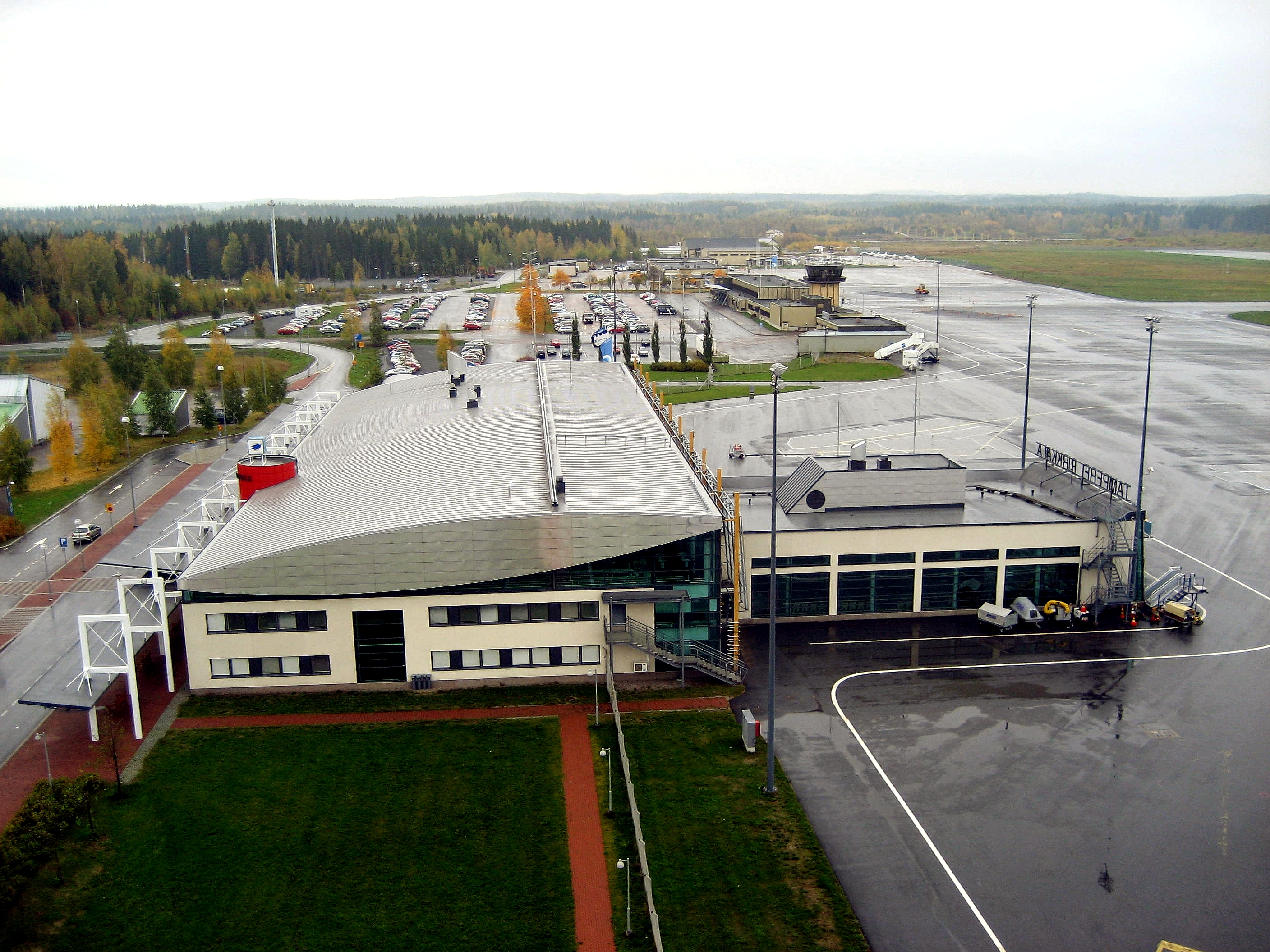
Terminal 1 exterior

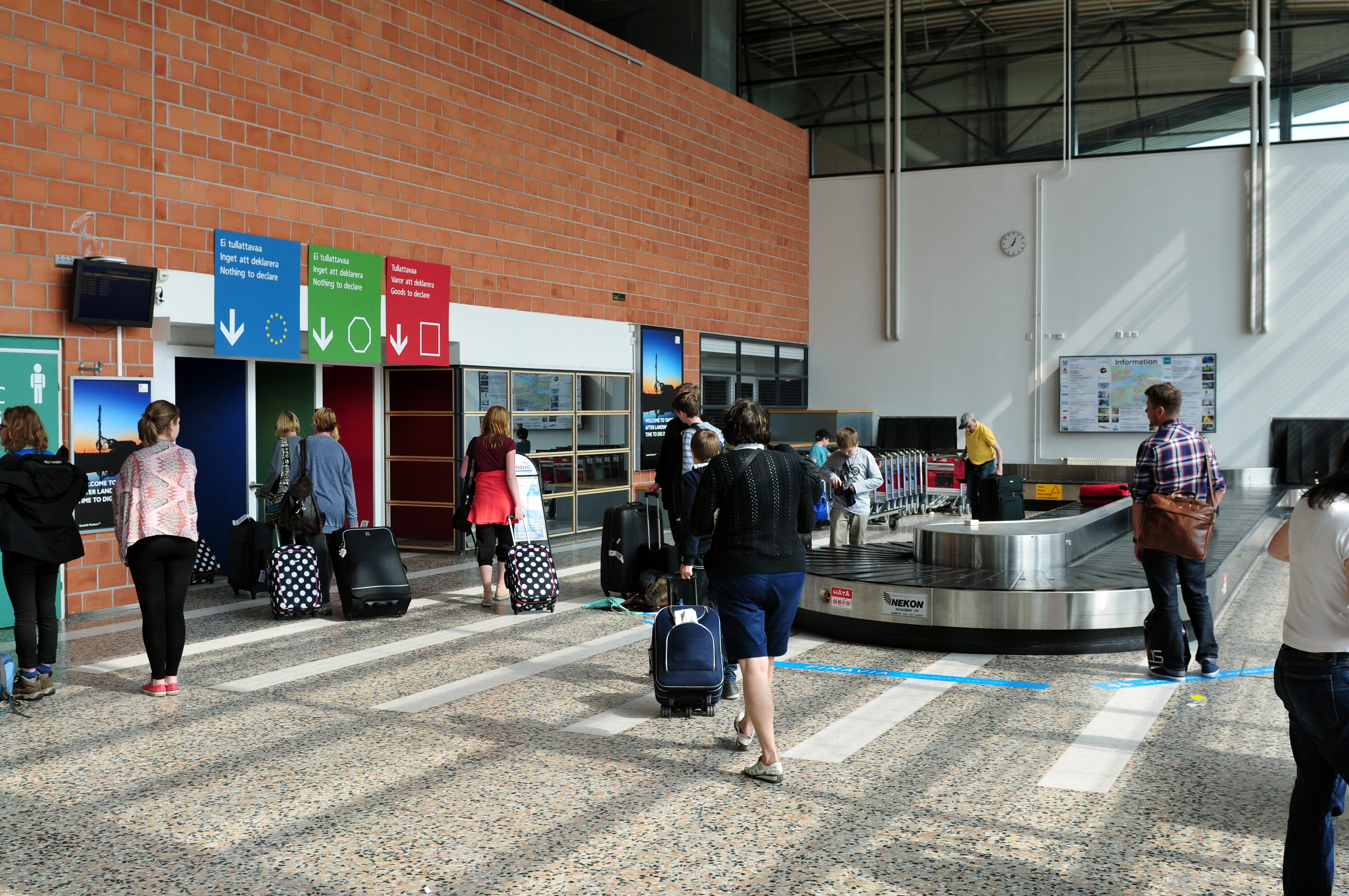
Terminal 1 interior

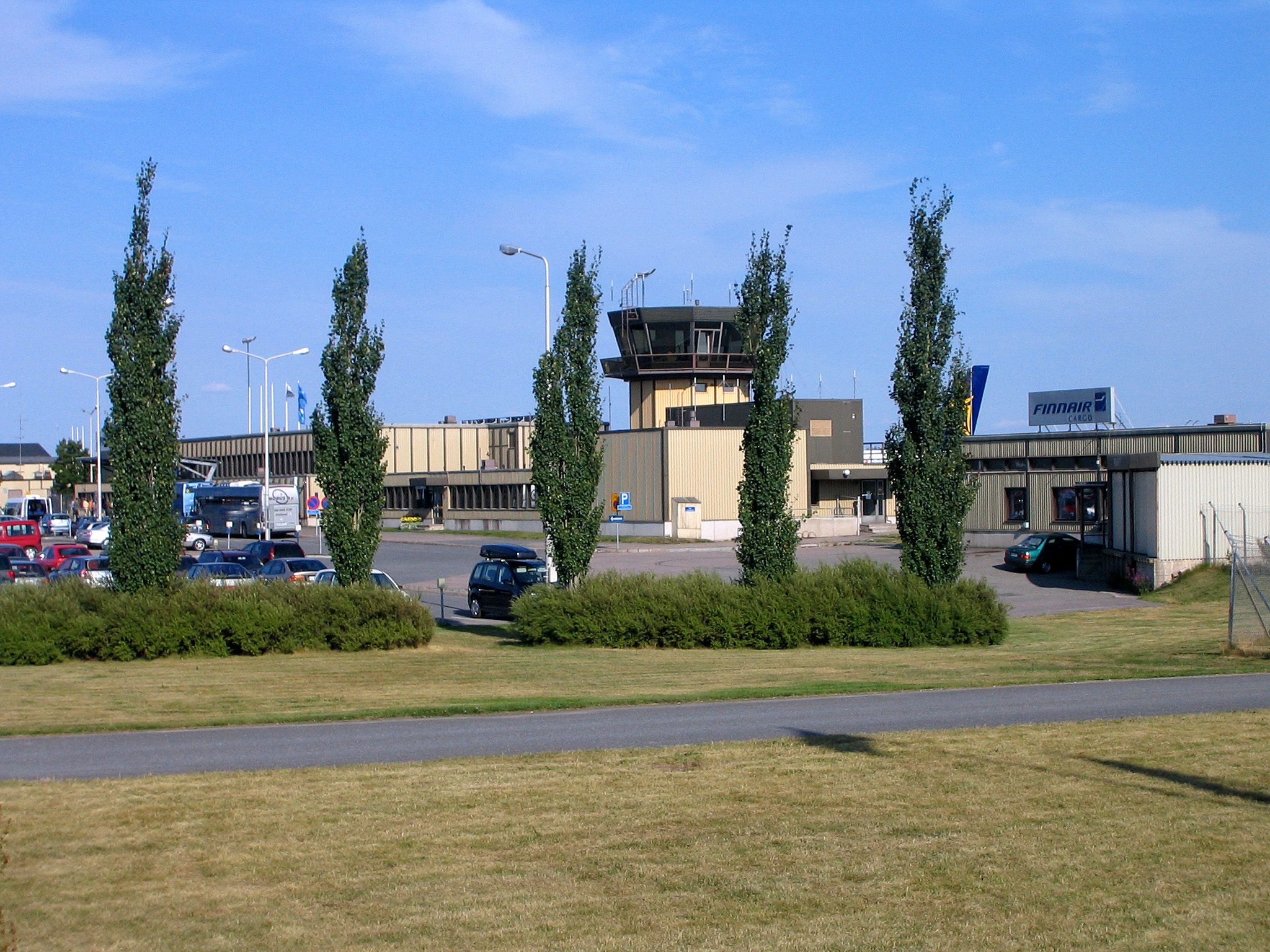
Control tower and Terminal 2

Annual passenger statistics for Tampere–Pirkkala Airport
Year	Domestic passengers	Change	International passengers	Change	Total passengers	Change
1998	113,170		81,549		194,719	
1999	119,283	5.4 ▲	103,746	27.2 ▲	223,029	14.5 ▲
2000	140,817	18.1 ▲	115,561	11.4 ▲	256,378	15.0 ▲
2001	135,175	−4.0 ▼	130,875	13.3 ▲	266,050	3.8 ▲
2002	109,747	−18.8 ▼	126,525	−3.3 ▼	236,272	−11.2 ▼
2003	105,543	−3.8 ▼	198,482	56.9 ▲	304,025	28.7 ▲
2004	128,250	21.5 ▲	367,642	85.2 ▲	495,892	63.1 ▲
2005	114,669	−10.6 ▼	482,433	31.2 ▲	597,102	20.4 ▲
2006	119,432	4.2 ▲	512,578	6.2 ▲	632,010	5.8 ▲
2007	113,713	−4.8 ▼	573,998	12.0 ▲	687,711	8.8 ▲
2008	107,954	−5.1 ▼	601,402	4.8 ▲	709,356	3.1 ▲
2009	85,372	−20.9 ▼	542,733	−9.8 ▼	628,105	−11.5 ▼
2010	91,312	7.0 ▲	526,085	−3.1 ▼	617,397	−1.7 ▼
2011	96,625	5.8 ▲	561,005	6.6 ▲	657,630	6.5 ▲
2012	85,738	−11.3 ▼	485,001	−13.5 ▼	570,739	−13.2 ▼
2013	88,268	3.0 ▲	378,403	−22.0 ▼	466,671	−18.2 ▼
2014	93,313	5.7 ▲	319,296	−15.6 ▼	412,609	−11.6 ▼
2015	89,938	−3.6 ▼	267,144	−16.3 ▼	357,082	−13.5 ▼
2016	86,278	−4.1 ▼	122,652	−54.1 ▼	208,930	−41.5 ▼
2017	85,844	−0.5 ▼	144,180	17.6 ▲	230,024	10.1 ▲
2018	81,705	−4.8 ▼	146,391	1.5 ▲	228,096	−0.8 ▼
2019	87,006	6.5 ▲	135,384	−7.5 ▼	222,390	−2.5 ▼
2020	16,736	−80.8 ▼	19,214	−85.8 ▼	35,950	−83.8 ▼
2021	412	−97.5 ▼	7,979	−58.5 ▼	8,391	−76.7 ▼
2022	8,527	1,969.7 ▲	159,801	1,902.8 ▲	168,328	1,906.1 ▲
2023	661	−76.7 ▼	213,038	33.3 ▲	213,699	27.0 ▲
2024	5,484	729.7 ▲	156,263	-26.7 ▼	161,747	-24.3 ▼
2025	3,500	-36.2 ▼	137,164	-12.2 ▼	140,664	-13.0 ▼

== Ground transportation ==
The airport is connected to the city centre of Tampere (25 minutes) by bus route 103, which runs a few times a day just after planes land. Bus route 34 goes to central Pirkkala once an hour during rush hours. One can transfer to a few local buses that go to other parts of Pirkkala or Nokia.

There are long-distance connections to Helsinki and other cities via the Tampere Bus Station operated by Matkahuolto.

Means of transport at Tampere–Pirkkala Airport
Means of transport	Operator	Route	Destinations
Bus	Tampere Regional Transport Authority	34	Pirkkala
Bus	Tampere Regional Transport Authority	103	Tampere railway station Tampere bus station

== See also ==
- List of the busiest airports in the Nordic countries
