= Sarankulma =

City district in Tampere, Finland

Coordinates: 61°27′25″N 23°44′00″E

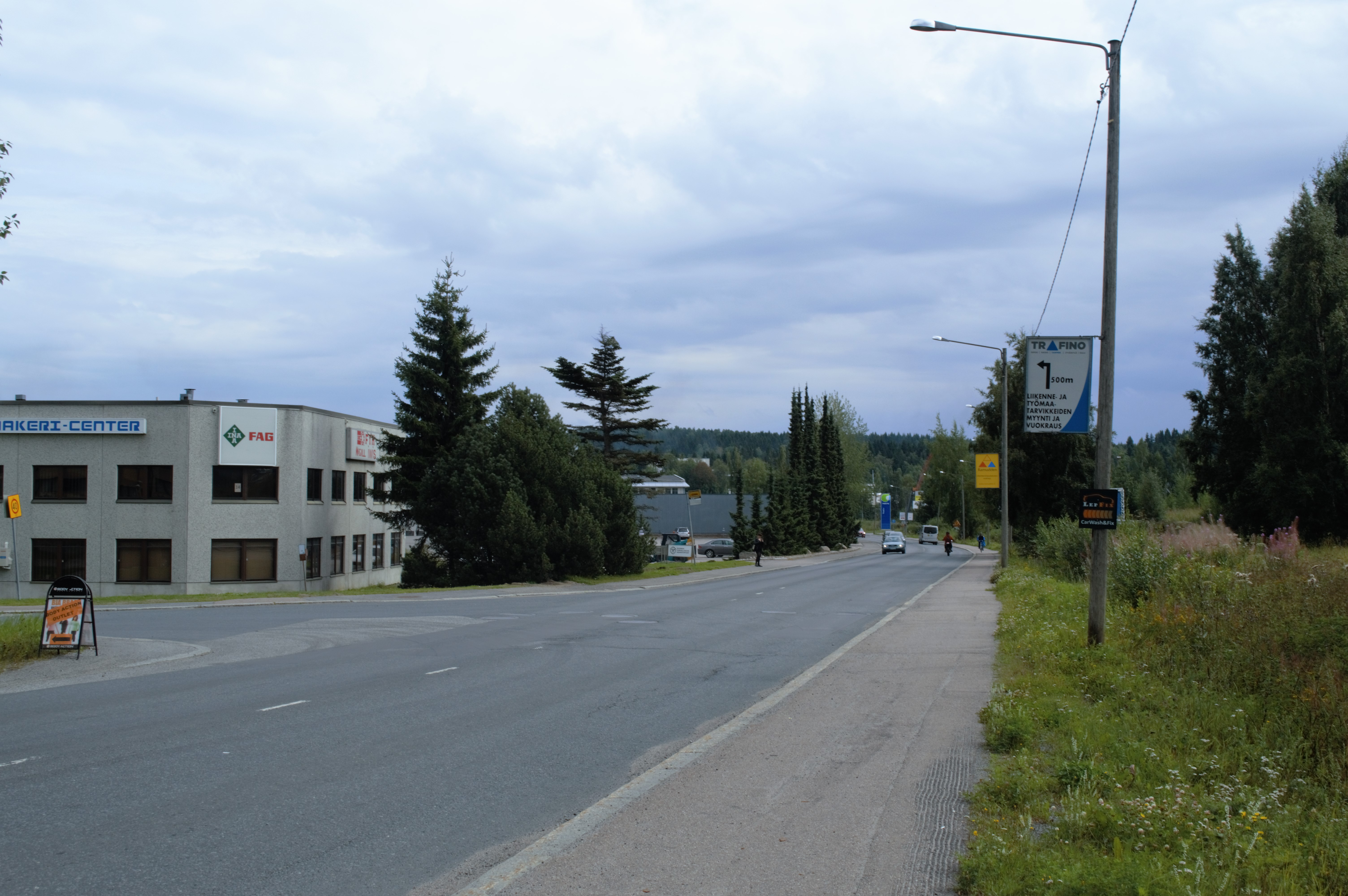
Nuutisarankatu street in Sarankulma

Sarankulma is a district located in the southern part of Tampere, Finland. It borders Härmälä in the north, Peltolammi in the east and the Pirkkala's municipal border in the west. There is industry in the area and former editorial office of Aamulehti was previously located in Sarankulma. The Pärrinkoski's nature conservation area is located on the southern border of Sarankulma.

The name Sarankulma derives from a croft called Sarka located at the Hatanpää Manor area, which was later divided into the premises of Nuutisara and Pöytäsara. The district is relatively new, as its town plan was approved in 1972. Sarankulma was primarily zoned as an industrial area.
