= Vuores =

City district in Tampere, Finland

Coordinates: 61°25′52″N 23°48′43″E

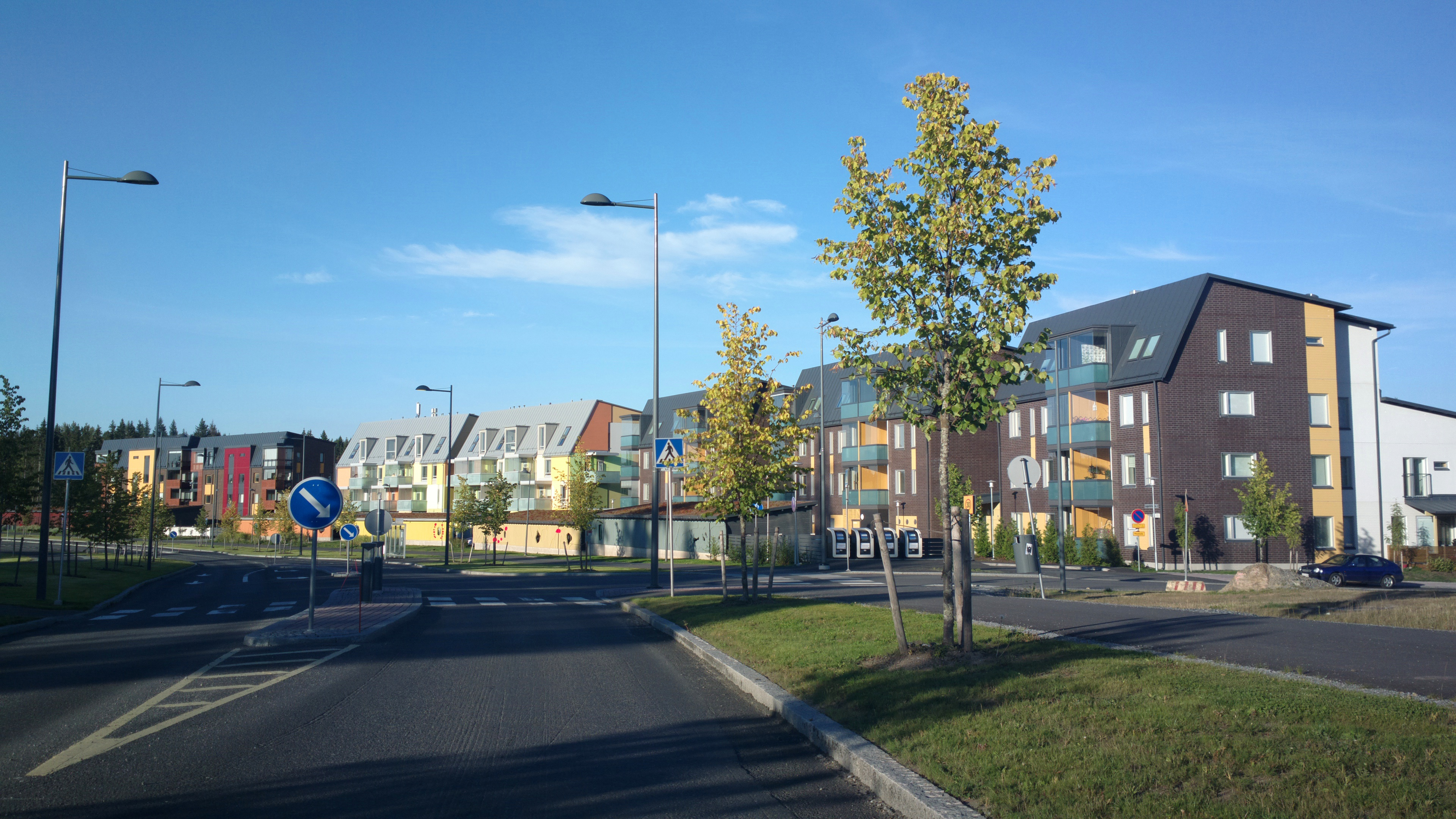
Vuores in 2013

Vuores (Finnish pronunciation: [ˈʋuo̞̯re̞s̠]) is an area located on the border of Tampere and Lempäälä in the Pirkanmaa region, Finland. Each municipality is building in its own area, but a partial master plan has been drawn up in co-operation. On the Tampere side, construction began in 2010. The area is diverse in terms of terrain and nature, and there are numerous lakes. In the 2019 agglomeration delimitation, Vuores formed its own urban area with an area of 3,03 km^{2}. The urban area had 5,355 inhabitants and was the second most densely populated urban area in Finland with a population density of 1,767 inhabitants/km^{2}.

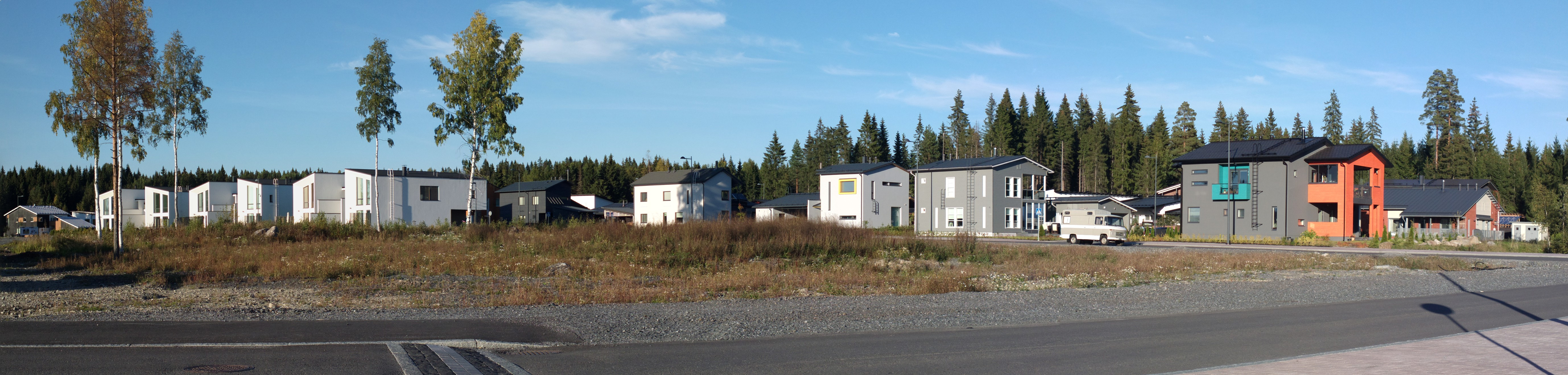
The 2012 housing fair area of Vuores

The district has been designed on the basis of eco-efficiency in cooperation with the City of Tampere's ECO2 program. For example, the draft town plan for Koukkuranta has been assessed with a special eco-efficiency tool developed by VTT. Tampere participates in the further development of the tool. There are ongoing development projects in Vuores to promote households’ access to renewable energy, such as wind and solar power. There is a waste pipe collection system on Vuores. Vuores' traffic planning is also based on efficient public transport; it is handled by buses, although the design also provided for the implementation of the tramway. According to the regional master plan of the Tampere light rail, the tramway could be implemented in Vuores in the 2030s.

According to a press release issued by the City of Tampere in October 2016, about 11,000 inhabitants will be coming to Vuores by 2025. A housing fair was held in the area in 2012.
