= Kaukajärvi (district) =

City district in Tampere, Finland

Coordinates: 61°28′20″N 23°53′00″E

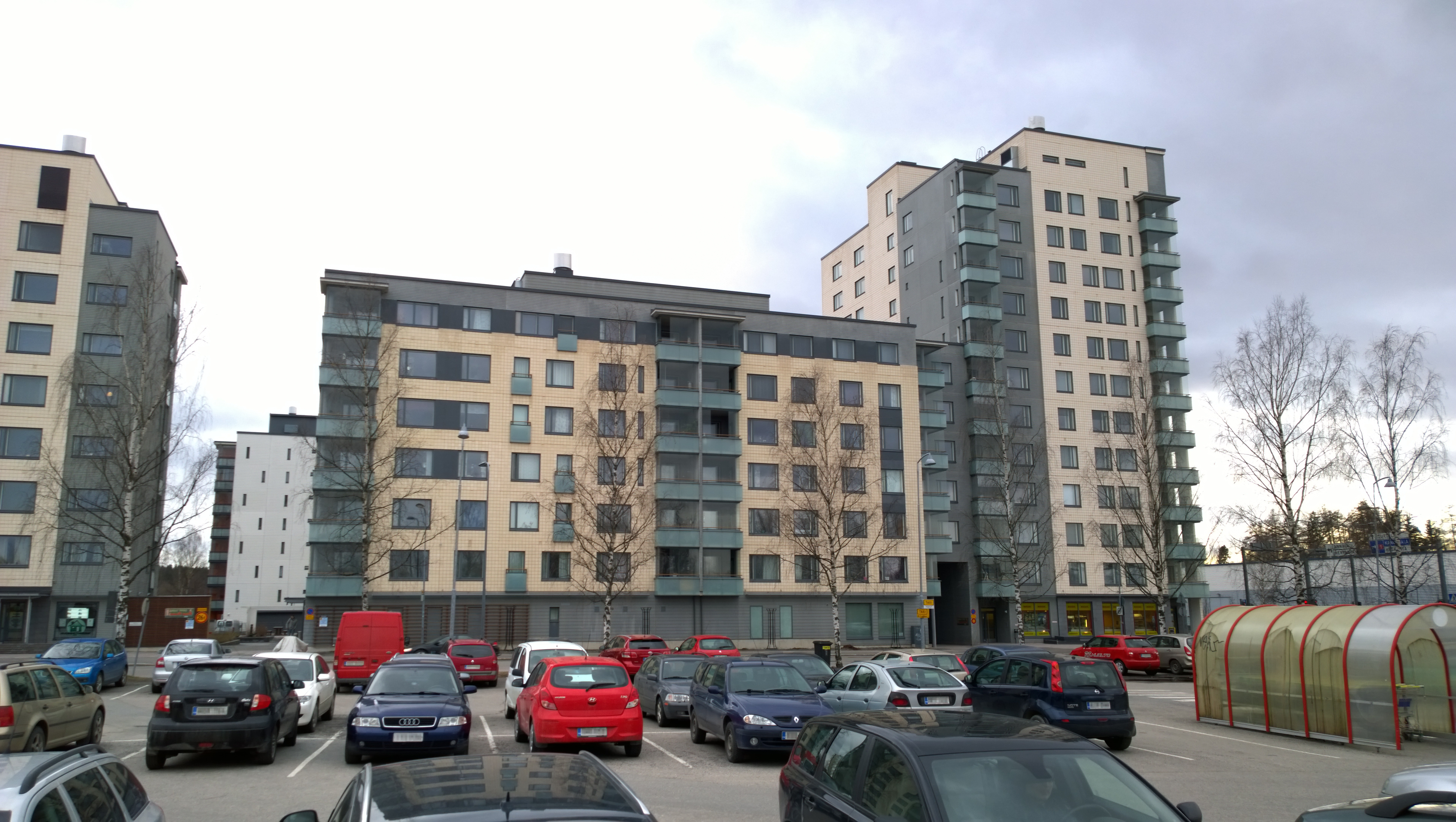
Apartment buildings at Keskisenkatu in Kaukajärvi

Kaukajärvi is a district in Tampere, Finland. It is located between the Highway 9 (E63) and the three-kilometer-long Lake Kaukajärvi, where district gets its name.

== Description ==
Construction of the Kaukajärvi suburb began in the 1960s, the first in the city. The Kaukajärvi statistical area had 12,326 inhabitants as of 2017. The district is also located right on the border of the town of Kangasala.

Kaukajärvi has an international school called Kaukajärvi School founded in 1969, which provides education for grades 1–10.

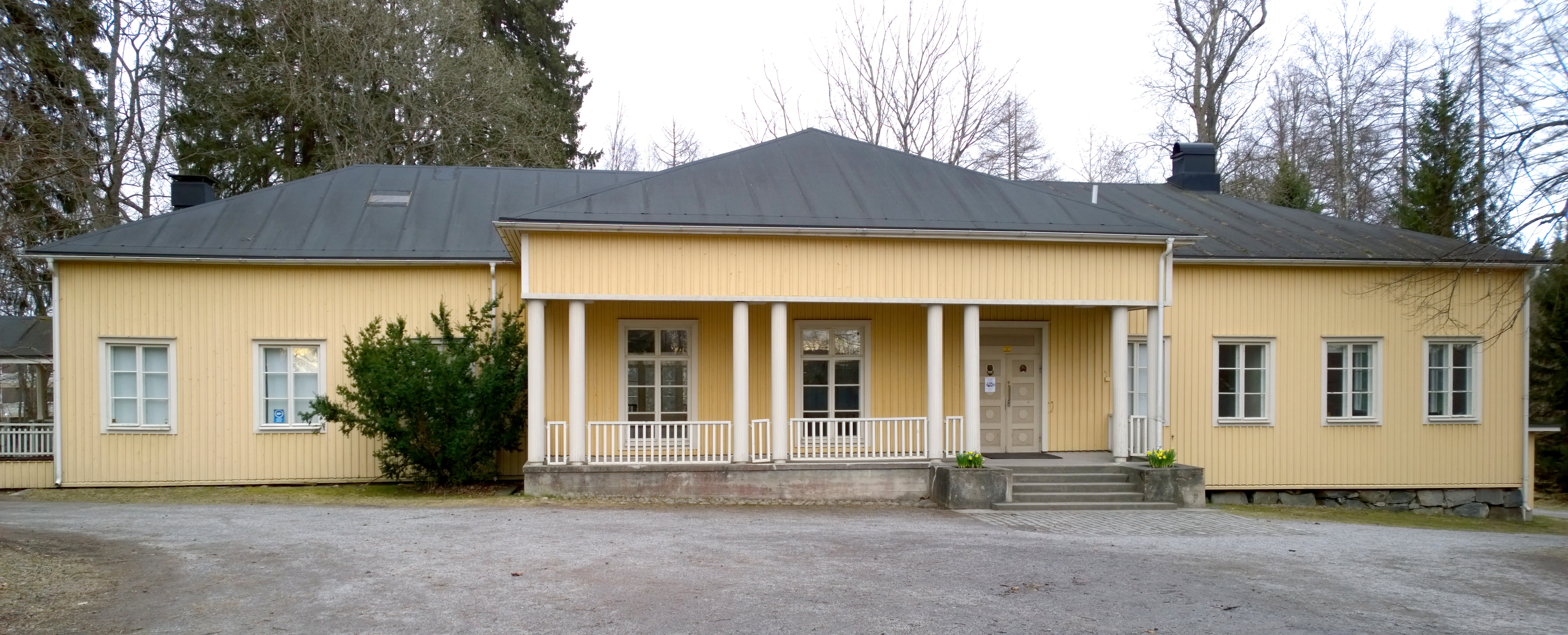
The Haihara Manor

== See also ==
- Haihara
- Hervanta
