= Kämmenniemi =

City district in Tampere, Finland

Coordinates: 61°37′38″N 23°49′58″E

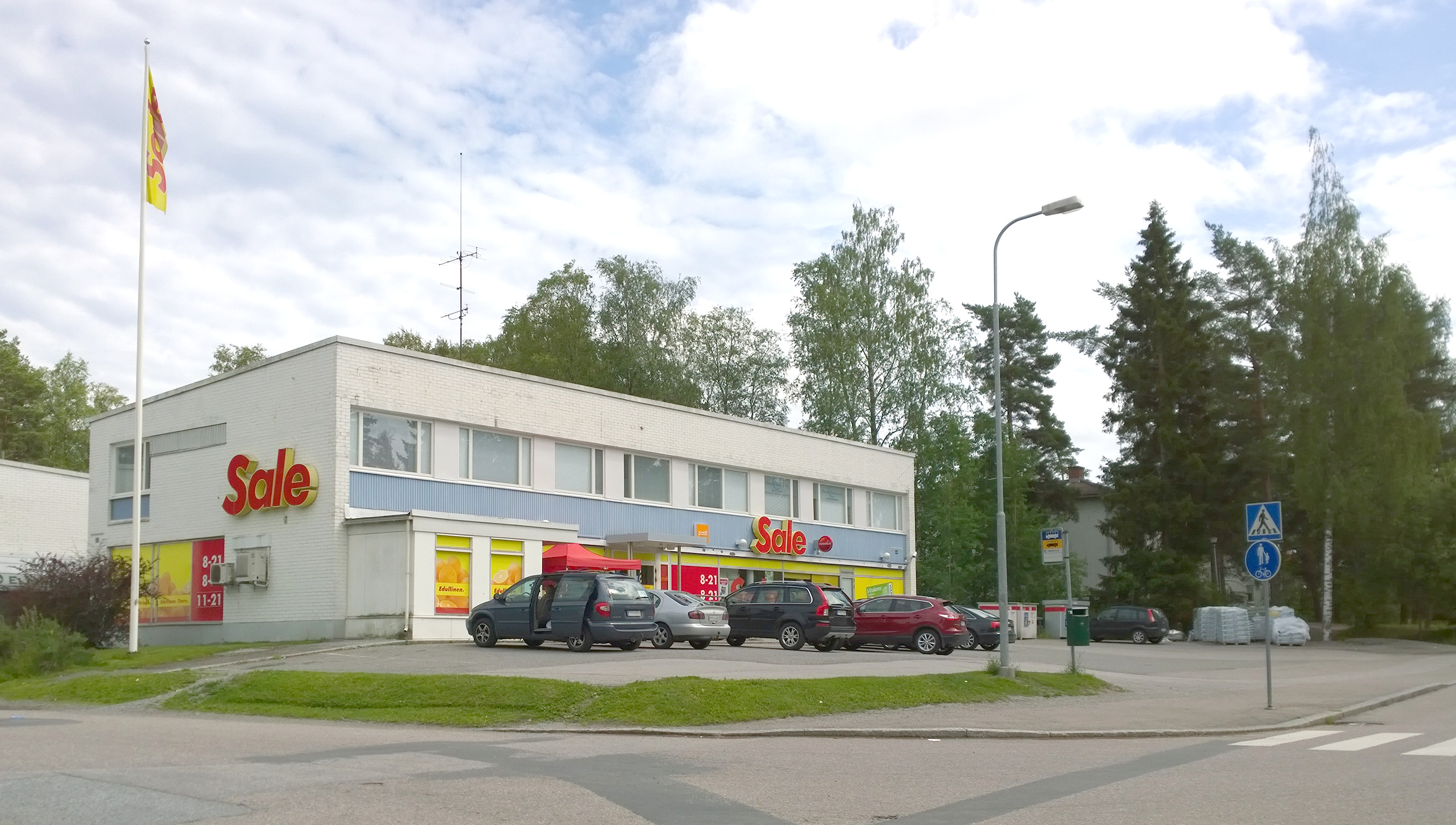
Sale grocery store in Kämmenniemi

Kämmenniemi (Finnish pronunciation: [ˈkæmːenˌnie̯mi]) is a district, a statistical area and an urban area of Tampere, Finland, located in the area of the former municipality of Teisko. The regional road 338 between Tampere and Ruovesi runs through Kämmenniemi. The distance from the village to the city center of Tampere is about 25 kilometers. The most important sights and buildings in Kämmenniemi are, for example, the Aunessilta arch bridge and Kämmenniemi School. Among other things, the annual Teisko market is organized in Kämmenniemi. Kämmenniemi also has a library and fire station of the Teisko's volunteer fire department. The Paarlahti bay is also located in Kämmenniemi, which is called the only fjord in Finland; however, according to official definitions, it does not quite meet the characteristics of a fjord.

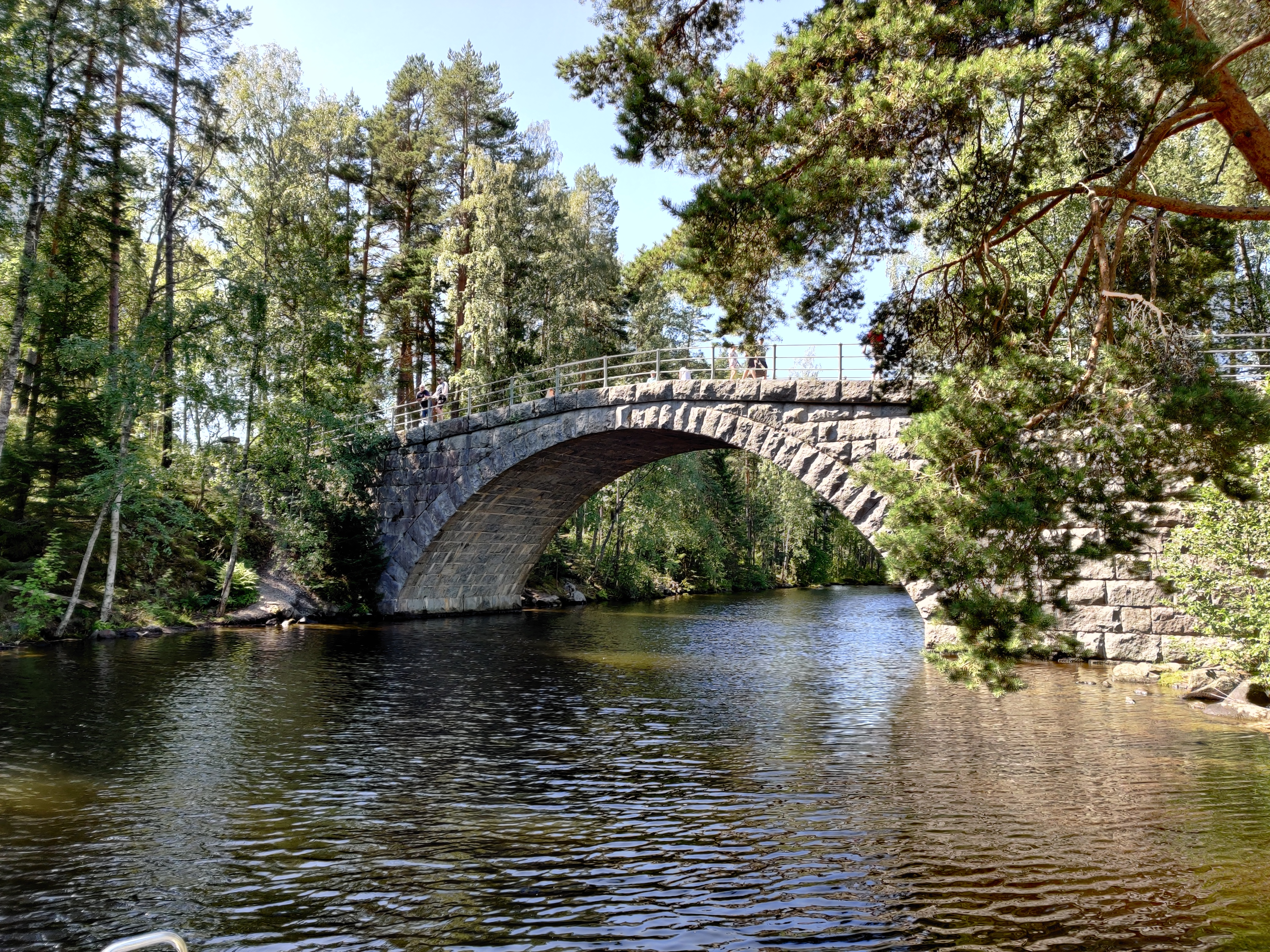
Aunessilta

Kämmenniemi is mentioned in the land register of 1540 as a village of five houses called Kemmenniemi, later also in the form Kemenniemi. Permanent settlement is known to have existed in the area at least since the 14th century. Teisko, which originally belonged to Messukylä as a chapel parish, became independent in 1860. At the beginning of 1972, the municipality of Teisko was annexed to the city of Tampere, and the first town plan of Kämmenniemi was confirmed soon after the municipal union. Most of the street names are based on the old place names in the region.

Kämmenniemi had a population of 1,958 in 2022.

== See also ==
- Tampere urban area
- Teisko

== Sources ==
=== Further reading ===
- Maija Louhivaara: Tampereen kadunnimet. Tampereen museoiden julkaisuja 51, 1999, Tampere. (in Finnish)
