= Park =

Area of naturally occurring land set aside for visitor enjoyment and other purposes

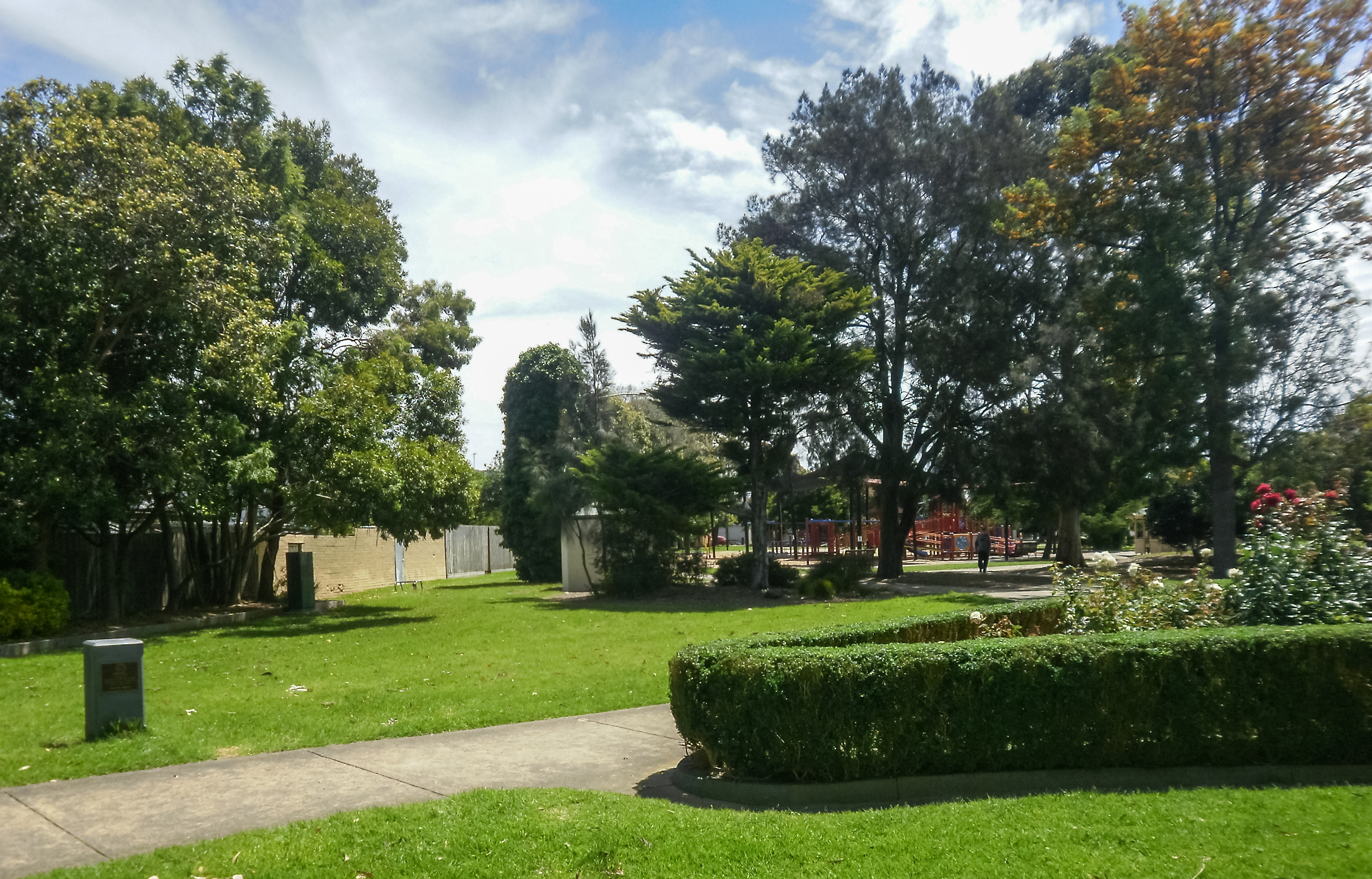
Halley Park in Bentleigh, Victoria, Australia

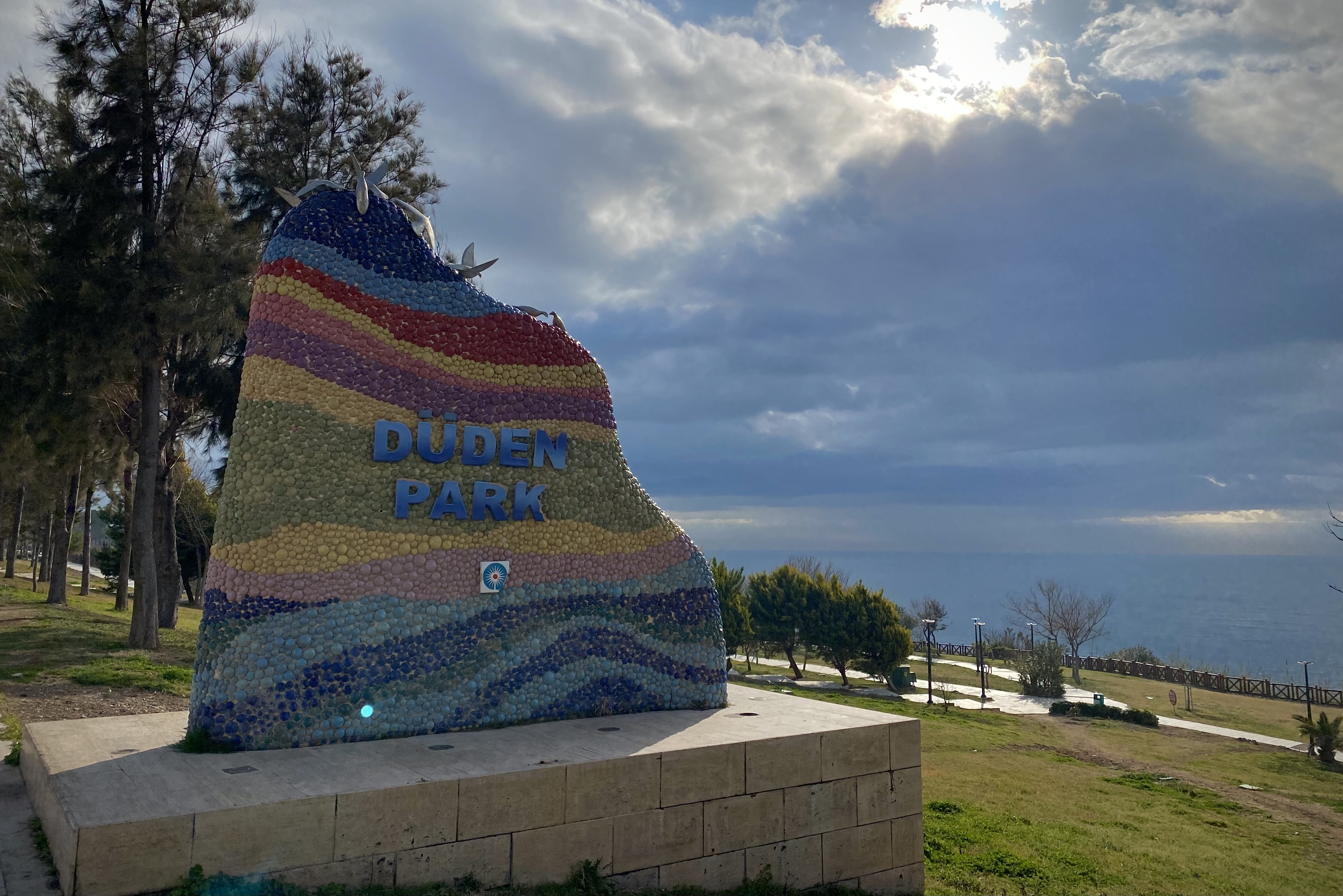
Düden Park sign in Antalya, Turkey

A park is an area of natural, semi-natural or planted space set aside for human enjoyment and recreation or for the protection of wildlife or natural habitats. Urban parks are green spaces set aside for recreation inside towns and cities. National parks and country parks are green spaces used for recreation in the countryside. State parks and provincial parks are administered by sub-national government states and agencies. Parks may consist of grassy areas, rocks, soil and trees, but may also contain buildings and other artifacts such as monuments, fountains or playground structures. Many parks have fields for playing sports such as baseball and football, and paved areas for games such as basketball. Many parks have trails for walking, biking and other activities. Some parks are built adjacent to bodies of water or watercourses and may comprise a beach or boat dock area. Urban parks often have benches for sitting and may contain picnic tables and barbecue grills.

The largest parks can be vast natural areas of hundreds of thousands of square kilometers (or square miles), with abundant wildlife and natural features such as mountains and rivers. In many large parks, camping in tents is allowed with a permit. Many natural parks are protected by law, and users may have to follow restrictions (e.g. rules against open fires or bringing in glass bottles). Large national and sub-national parks are typically overseen by a park ranger. Large parks may have areas for canoeing and hiking in the warmer months and, in some northern hemisphere countries, cross-country skiing and snowshoeing in colder months. There are also amusement parks that have live shows, fairground rides, refreshments, and games of chance or skill.

== History ==
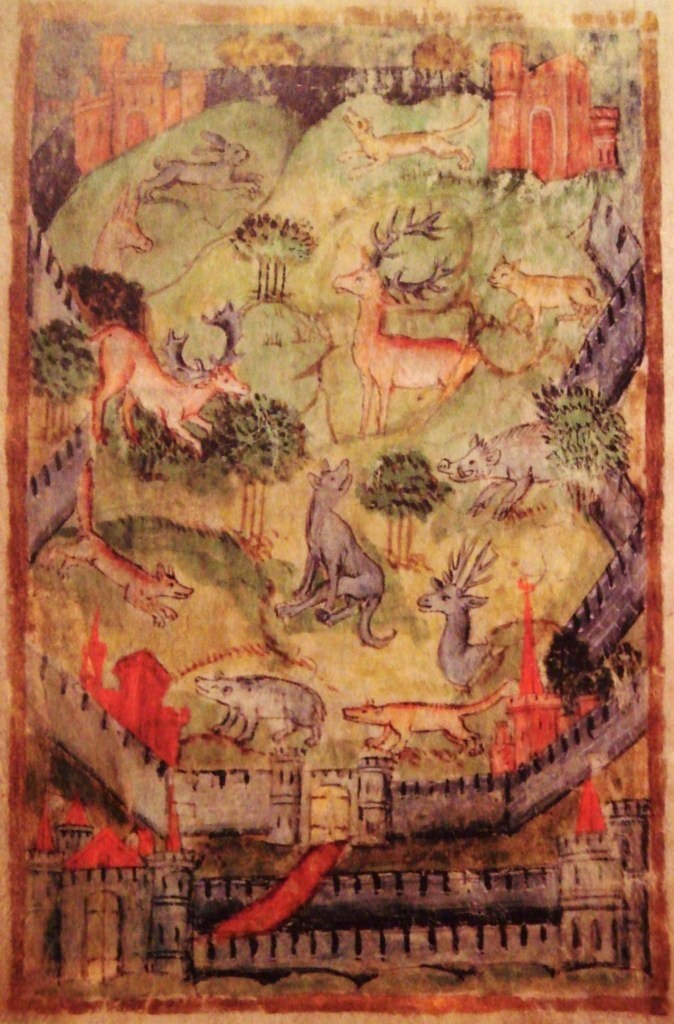
Depiction of a medieval hunting park from a 15th-century manuscript

English deer parks was used by the aristocracy in medieval times for game hunting. They had walls or thick hedges around them to keep game animals (e.g., stags) in and people out. It was strictly forbidden for commoners to hunt animals in these deer parks.

These game preserves evolved into landscaped parks set around mansions and country houses from the sixteenth century onwards. These may have served as hunting grounds but they also proclaimed the owner's wealth and status. An aesthetic of landscape design began in these stately home parks where the natural landscape was enhanced by landscape architects such as Capability Brown and Humphry Repton. The French formal garden such as designed by André Le Nôtre at Versailles is an earlier and elaborate example. As cities became crowded, private hunting grounds became places for the public.

Early opportunities for the creation of urban parks in both Europe and the United States grew out of medieval practice to secure pasture lands within the safe confines of villages and towns. The most famous US example of a city park that evolved from this practice is the Boston Common in Boston, Massachusetts (1634).

With the Industrial Revolution parks took on a new meaning as areas set aside to preserve a sense of nature in the cities and towns. Sporting activity came to be a major use for these urban parks. Areas of outstanding natural beauty were also set aside as national parks to prevent them from being spoiled by uncontrolled development.

== Design ==
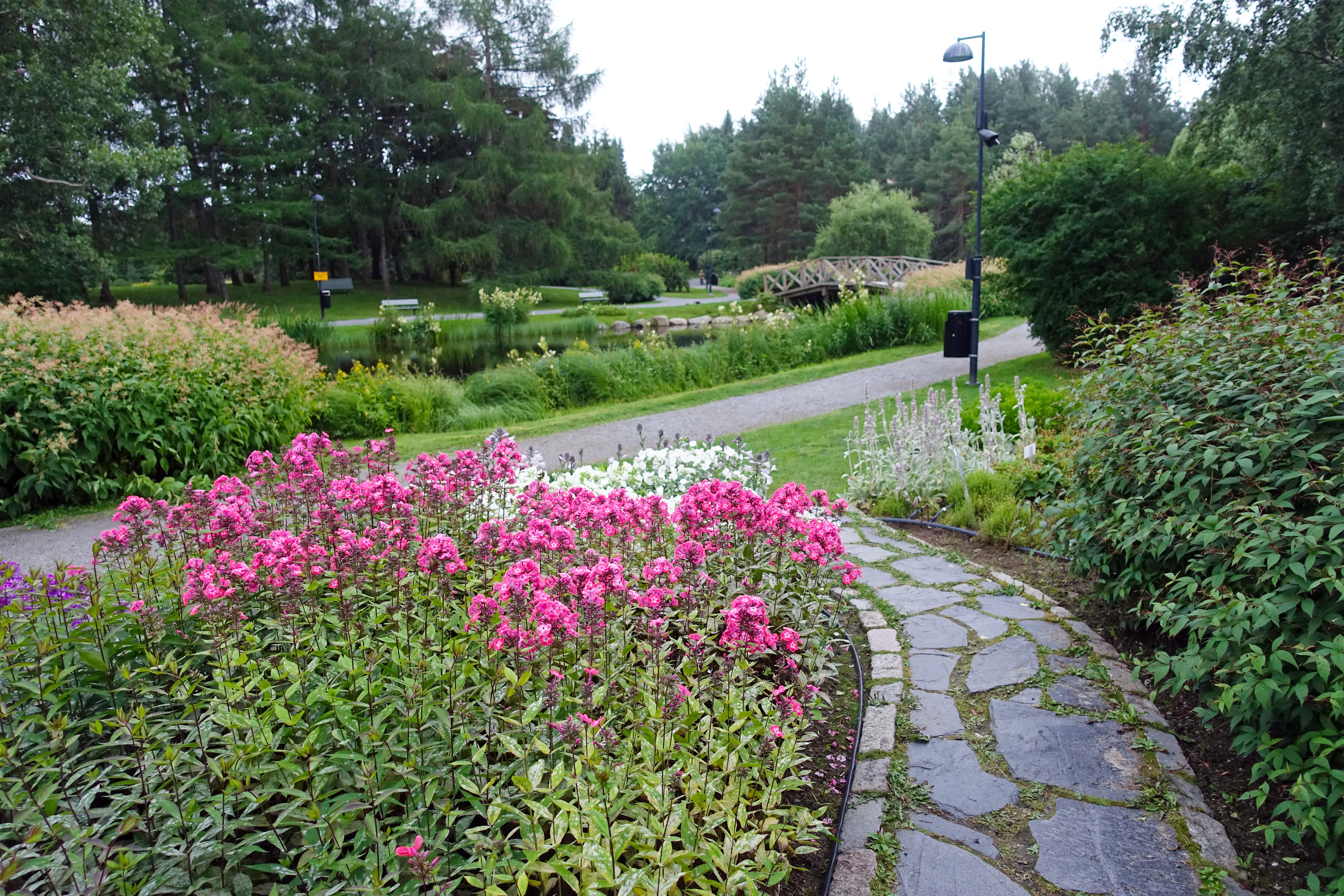
Hatanpää Park in Tampere, Finland

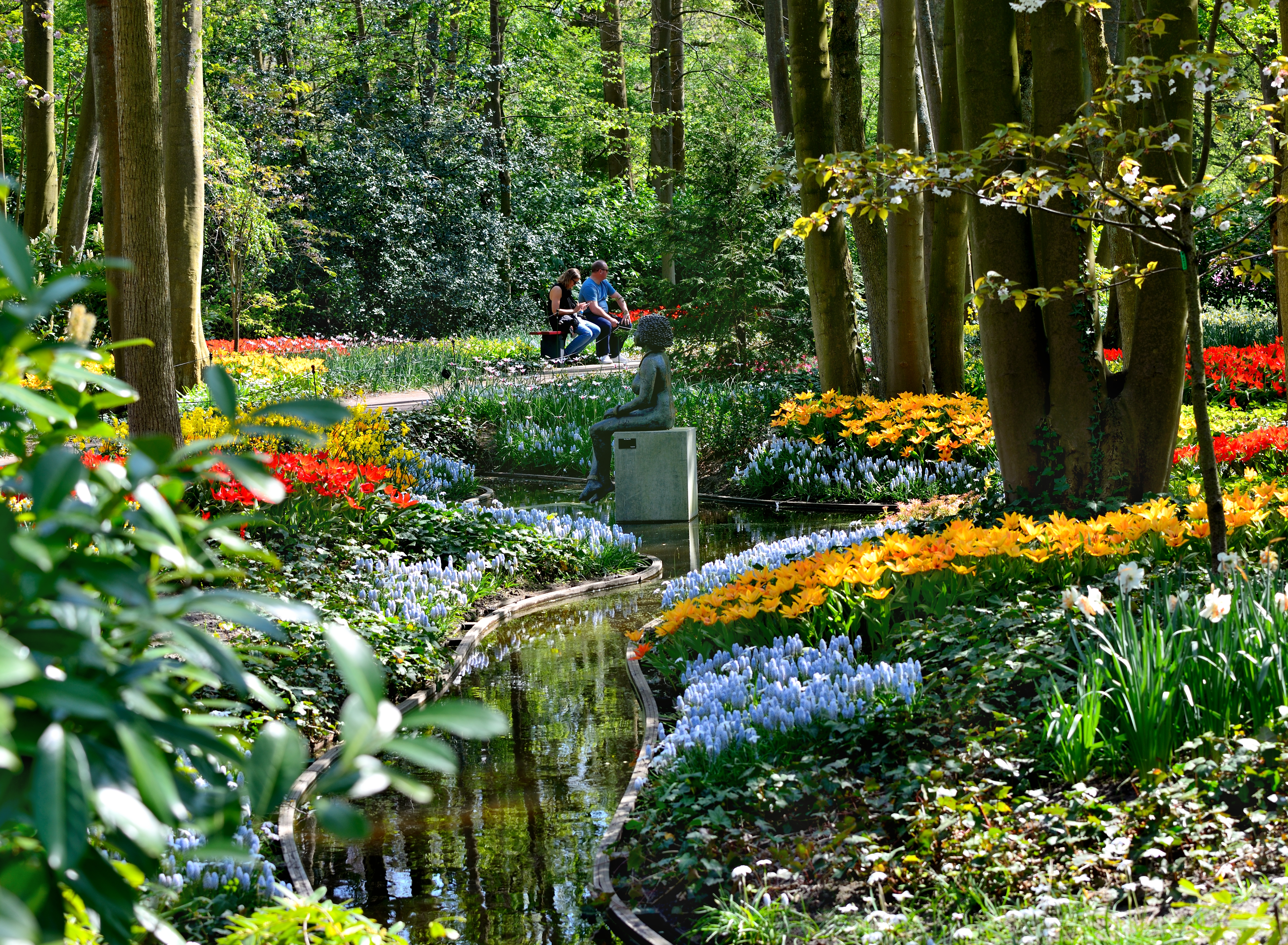
Keukenhof, Royparkal Tulip Park, Netherlands

Park design is influenced by the intended purpose and audience, as well as by the available land features. A park may feature walking paths and decorative landscaping, while a park intended to provide recreation for children may include a playground. Specific features such as riding trails may be included to support certain activities. Some seating is often provided. Some parks in the UK and elsewhere have a "Happy to Chat" bench, a bench with a sign on it with wording such as "Happy to chat bench. Sit here if you don't mind someone stopping to say hello".

The design of a park may determine who is willing to use it. Walkers might feel unsafe on a mixed-use path that is dominated by fast-moving cyclists or horses. Different landscaping and infrastructure may even affect children's rates of park usage according to gender. Redesigns of two parks in Vienna suggested that the creation of multiple semi-enclosed play areas in a park could encourage equal use by boys and girls.

Parks are part of the urban infrastructure: for physical activity, for families and communities to gather and socialize, or for a simple respite. Research reveals that people who exercise outdoors in green-space derive greater mental health benefits. Providing activities for all ages, abilities and income levels is important for the physical and mental well-being of the public.

Parks can also benefit pollinators, and some parks (such as Saltdean Oval in East Sussex) have been redesigned to accommodate them better. Some organizations, such as the Xerces Society are also promoting this idea.

=== Role in city revitalization ===
City parks play a role in improving cities and improving the futures for residents and visitors - for example, Millennium Park in Chicago, Illinois or the Mill River Park and Green way in Stamford, CT. One group that is a strong proponent of parks for cities is The American Society of Landscape Architects. They argue that parks are important to the fabric of the community on an individual scale and broader scales such as entire neighborhoods, city districts or city park systems.

=== Design for safety ===
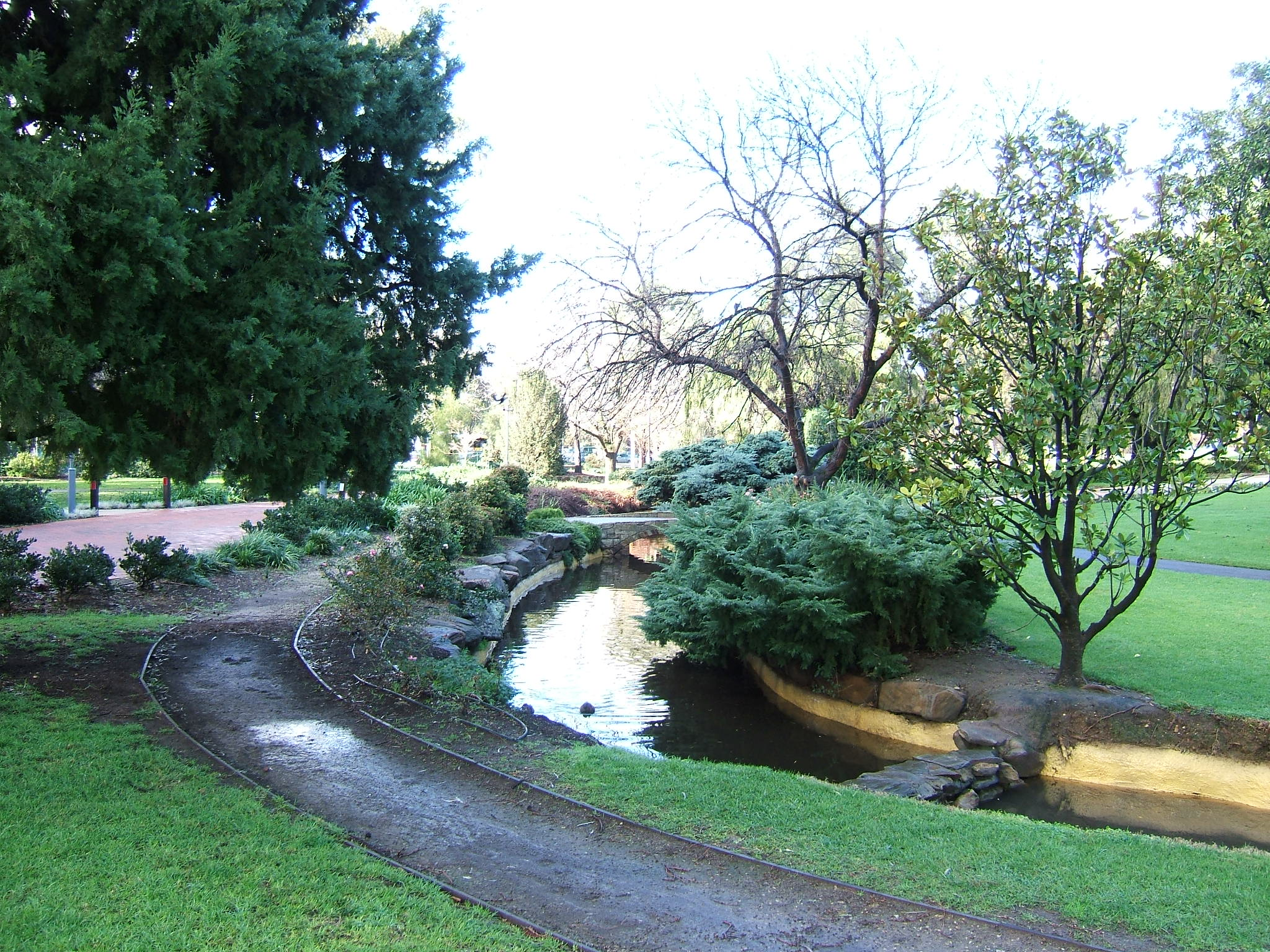
Veale Gardens in Adelaide, Australia

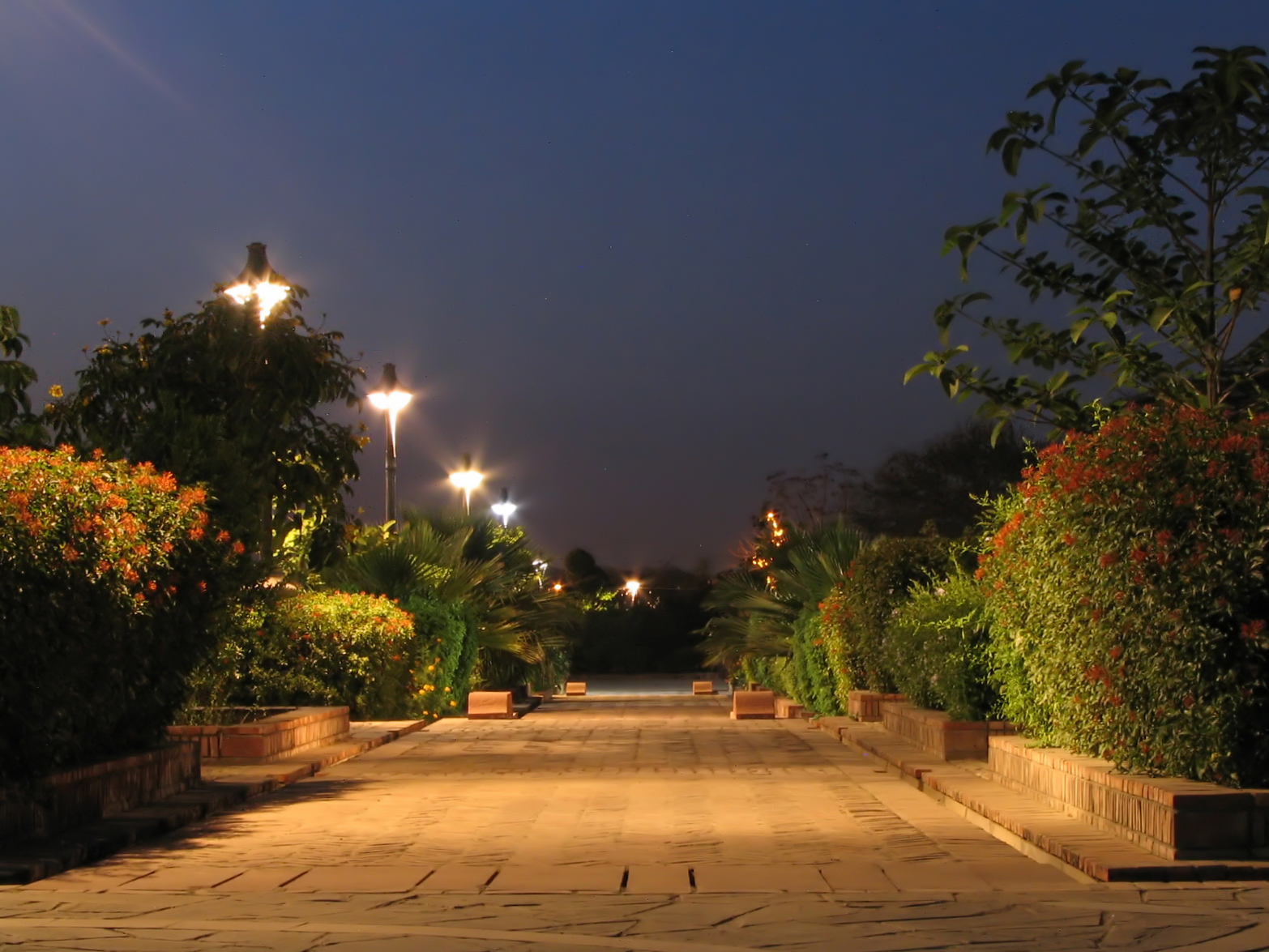
A well-lit path in Delhi's Garden of Five Senses

Parks need to feel safe for people to use them. Research shows that perception of safety can be more significant in influencing human behavior than actual crime statistics. If citizens perceive a park as unsafe, they might not make use of it at all.

A study undertaken in four American cities, Albuquerque, NM, Chapel Hill/Durham, NC, Columbus, OH, and Philadelphia, PA, with 3815 survey participants who lived within a half-mile of a park indicated that in addition to safety park facilities also played a significant role in park use and that increasing facilities instead of creating an image of a safe park would increase use of the park.

There are a number of features that contribute to whether a park feels safe. Elements in the physical design of a park, such as an open and welcoming entry, good visibility (sight lines), and appropriate lighting and signage can all make a difference. Regular park maintenance, as well as programming and community involvement, can also contribute to a feeling of safety.

While Crime prevention through environmental design (CPTED) has been widely used in facility design, the use of CPTED in parks has not been. Iqbal and Ceccato carried out a study in Stockholm, Sweden to determine if it would be useful to apply to parks. Their study indicated that while CPTED could be useful, due to the nature of a park, increasing the look of safety can also have unintended consequences on the aesthetics of the park. Creating secure areas with bars and locks lowers the beauty of the park, as well as the nature of who is in charge of observing the public space and the feeling of being observed.

== Active and passive recreation areas ==
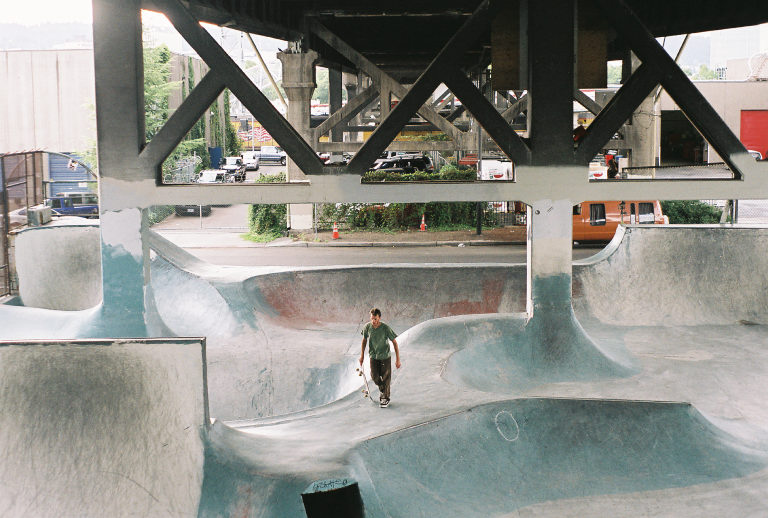
Burnside Skatepark in Portland, Oregon is one of the world's most recognizable skateparks.

Parks can be divided into active and passive recreation areas. Active recreation is that which has an urban character and requires intensive development. It often involves cooperative or team activity, including playgrounds, ball fields, swimming pools, gymnasiums, and skateparks. Active recreation such as team sports, due to the need to provide substantial space to congregate, typically involves intensive management, maintenance, and high costs. Passive recreation, also called "low-intensity recreation" is that which emphasizes the open-space aspect of a park and allows for the preservation of natural habitat. It usually involves a low level of development, such as rustic picnic areas, benches, and trails.

Many smaller neighborhood parks are receiving increased attention and valuation as significant community assets and places of refuge in heavily populated urban areas. Neighborhood groups around the world are joining to support local parks that have suffered from urban decay and government neglect.

Passive recreation typically requires less management which can be provided at lower costs than active recreation. Some open space managers provide trails for physical activity in the form of walking, running, horse riding, mountain biking, snowshoeing, or cross-country skiing; or activities such as observing nature, bird watching, painting, photography, or picnicking. Limiting park or open space use to passive recreation over all or a portion of the park's area eliminates or reduces the burden of managing active recreation facilities and developed infrastructure. Passive recreation amenities require routine upkeep and maintenance to prevent degradation of the environment.

== Conservation of biodiversity in parks ==
The general principle of how parks and greenspaces assist in the conservation of biodiversity is by creating natural environments for animals in urban areas. Biological diversity, or biodiversity, is the variety of life on Earth in all its forms. Fauna and flora are principal biotic components. They include all living species, which consist of plants, animals, and bacteria. Around half of the greenhouse gases in the Earth’s atmosphere get absorbed by the floral components of the biodiversity, providing nature-based aid in the fight against the climate change and habitat for the fauna.

When processes such as the decay of wood, winter dieback or succession are allowed to happen the natural cycle helps with biodiversity conservation. The amount of habitat can be increased more vegetation to parks – wildflowers, long grass areas, shrub, and trees. In parks located in urban area the conservation of native vegetation is tied to preservation of insects and mammals in the area. Tall trees and bushes create shadow for bodies of water with fish. Having all the animals co-existing together in a regulated environment generates a natural cycle of life where decaying bodies assist in the fertilization of the ground.

Alongside the preservation of native species parks with exotic fauna and flora drive diversity in natural ecosystem, aiding in the adaptation to urban environment. Richness of a park’s nature is associated with its age and size, with the older ones having a larder variety of breeds and greenery. Vegetation in parks can indirectly reduce air temperature and directly reduce levels of carbon dioxide by storing it as a biomass and due to the trees’ ability to absorb over 95% of ultraviolet radiation the aid in the reduction of skin cancer is a factor that is largely considered when new greenspaces are built.

== Parks owned or operated by government ==
=== National parks ===
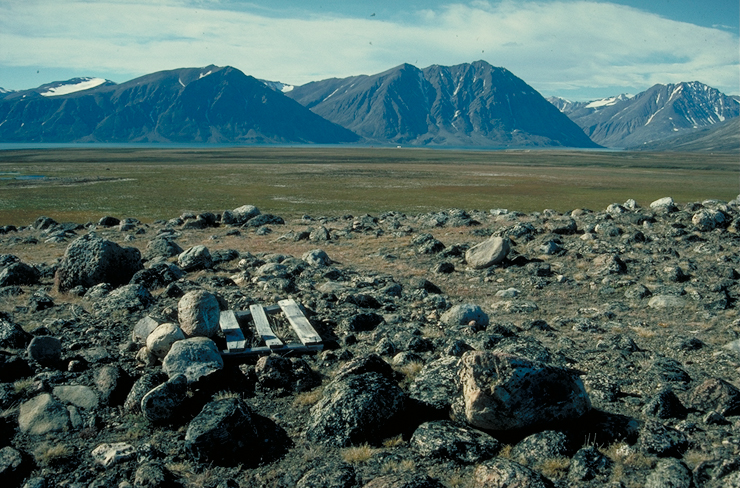
Northeast Greenland National Park, the world's largest national park

A national park is a reserve of land, usually, but not always declared and owned by a national government, protected from most human development and pollution. Although this may be so, it is not likely that the government of a specific area owns it, rather the community itself. National parks are a protected area of International Union for Conservation of Nature Category II. This implies that they are wilderness areas, but unlike pure nature reserves, they are established with the expectation of a certain degree of human visitation and supporting infrastructure.

While this type of national park had been proposed previously, the United States established the first "public park or pleasuring-ground for the benefit and enjoyment of the people", Yellowstone National Park, in 1872, although Yellowstone was not gazetted as a national park. The first officially designated national park was Mackinac Island, gazetted in 1875. Australia's Royal National Park, established in 1879, was the world's second officially established national park.

The largest national park in the world is the Northeast Greenland National Park, which was established in 1974 and currently protects 972,001 km^{2} (375,000 mi^{2}).

=== Sub-national parks ===
In some Federal systems, many parks are managed by the sub-national levels of government. In Brazil, the United States, and some states in Mexico, as well as in the Australian state of Victoria, these are known as state parks, whereas in Argentina, Canada and South Korea, they are known as provincial or territorial parks. In the United States, it is also common for individual counties to run parks, these are known as county parks.

=== Urban parks ===
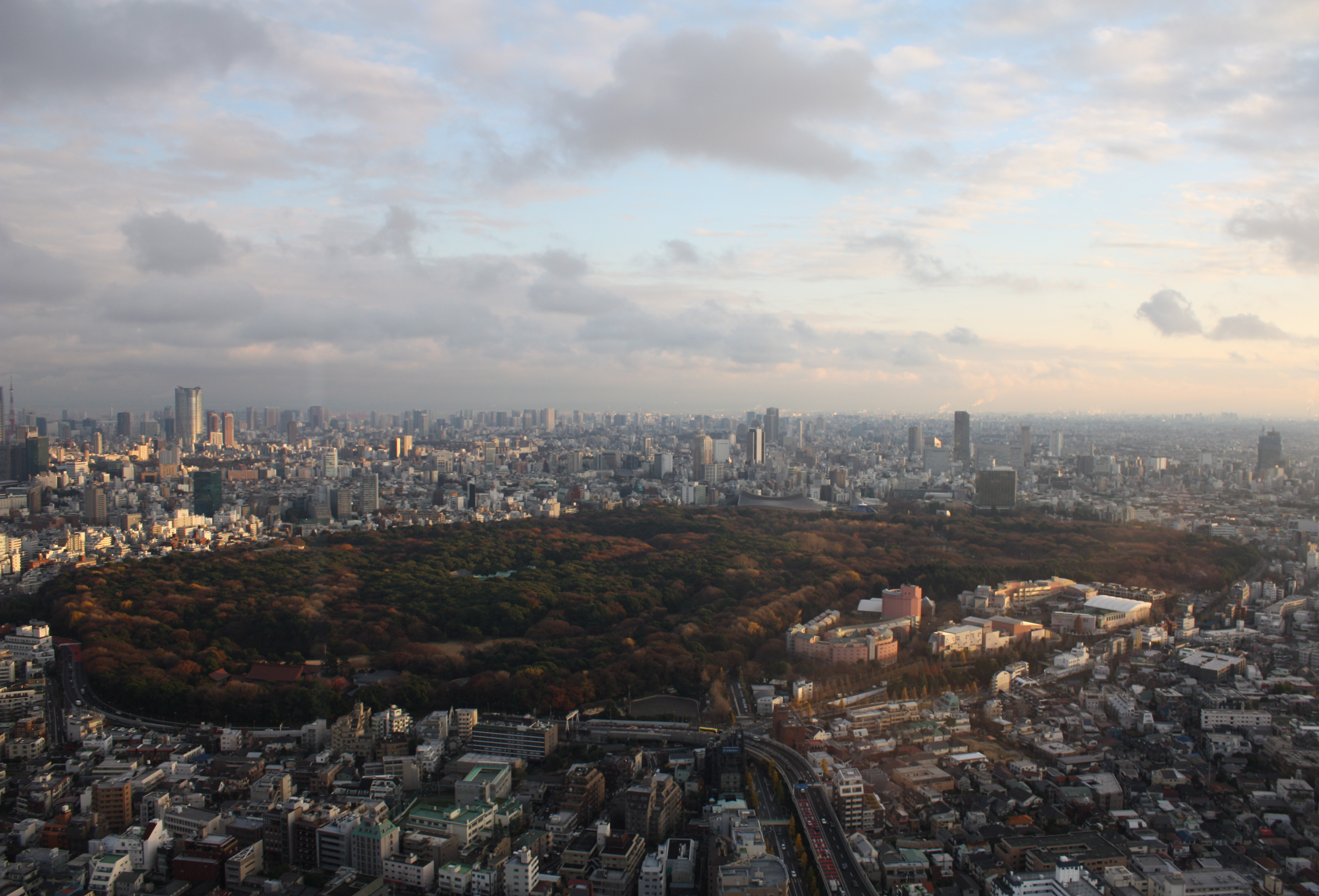
Yoyogi Park is a large urban park in Tokyo.

A park is an area of open space provided for recreational use, usually owned and maintained by a local government. Parks commonly resemble savannas or open woodlands, the types of landscape that human beings find most relaxing. Grass is typically kept short to discourage insect pests and to allow for the enjoyment of picnics and sporting activities. Trees are chosen for their beauty and to provide shade.

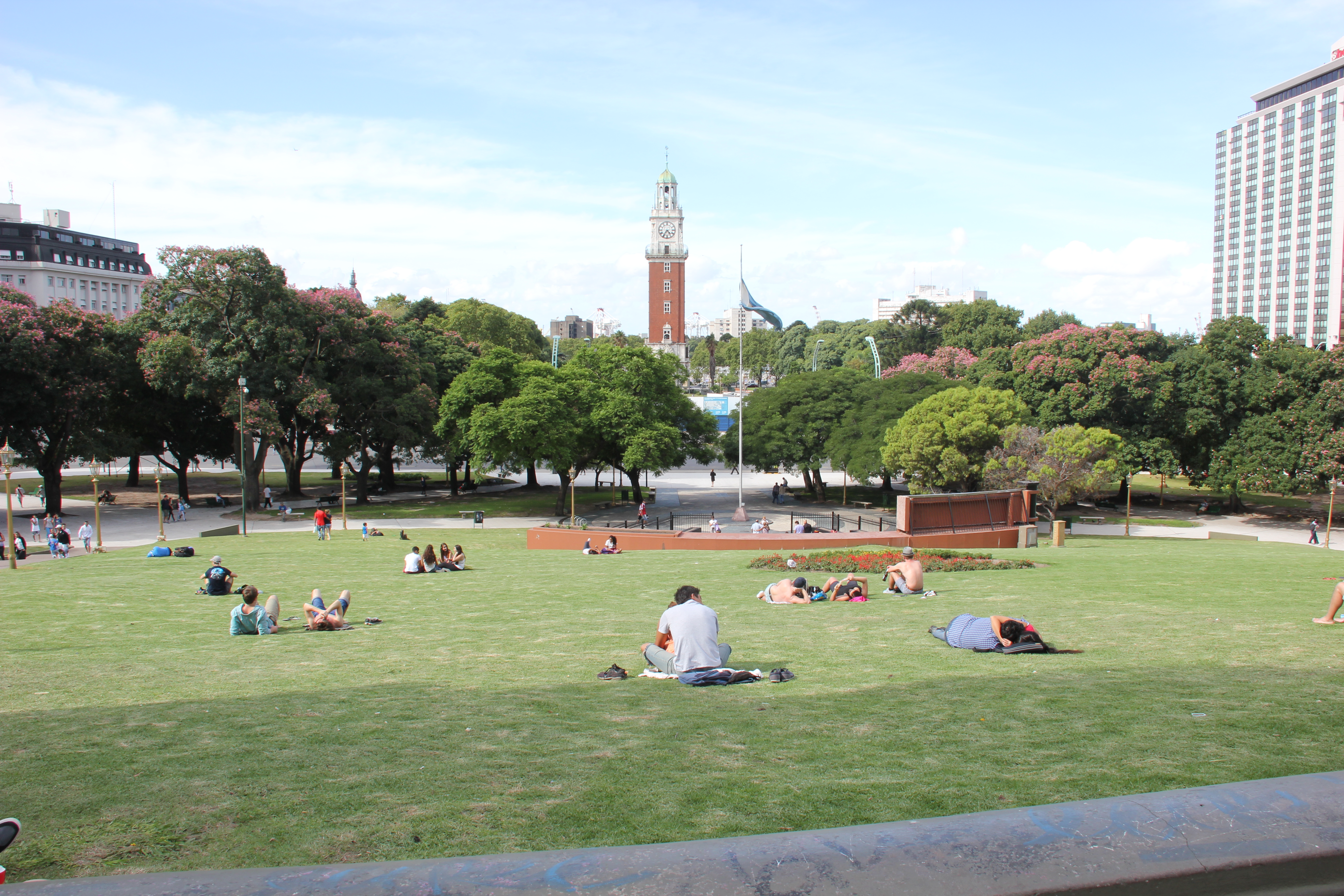
Plaza San Martín in Buenos Aires, Argentina

Some early parks include the la Alameda de Hércules, in Seville, a promenaded public mall, urban garden and park built in 1574, within the historic center of Seville; the City Park, in Budapest, Hungary, which was property of the Batthyány family and was later made public.

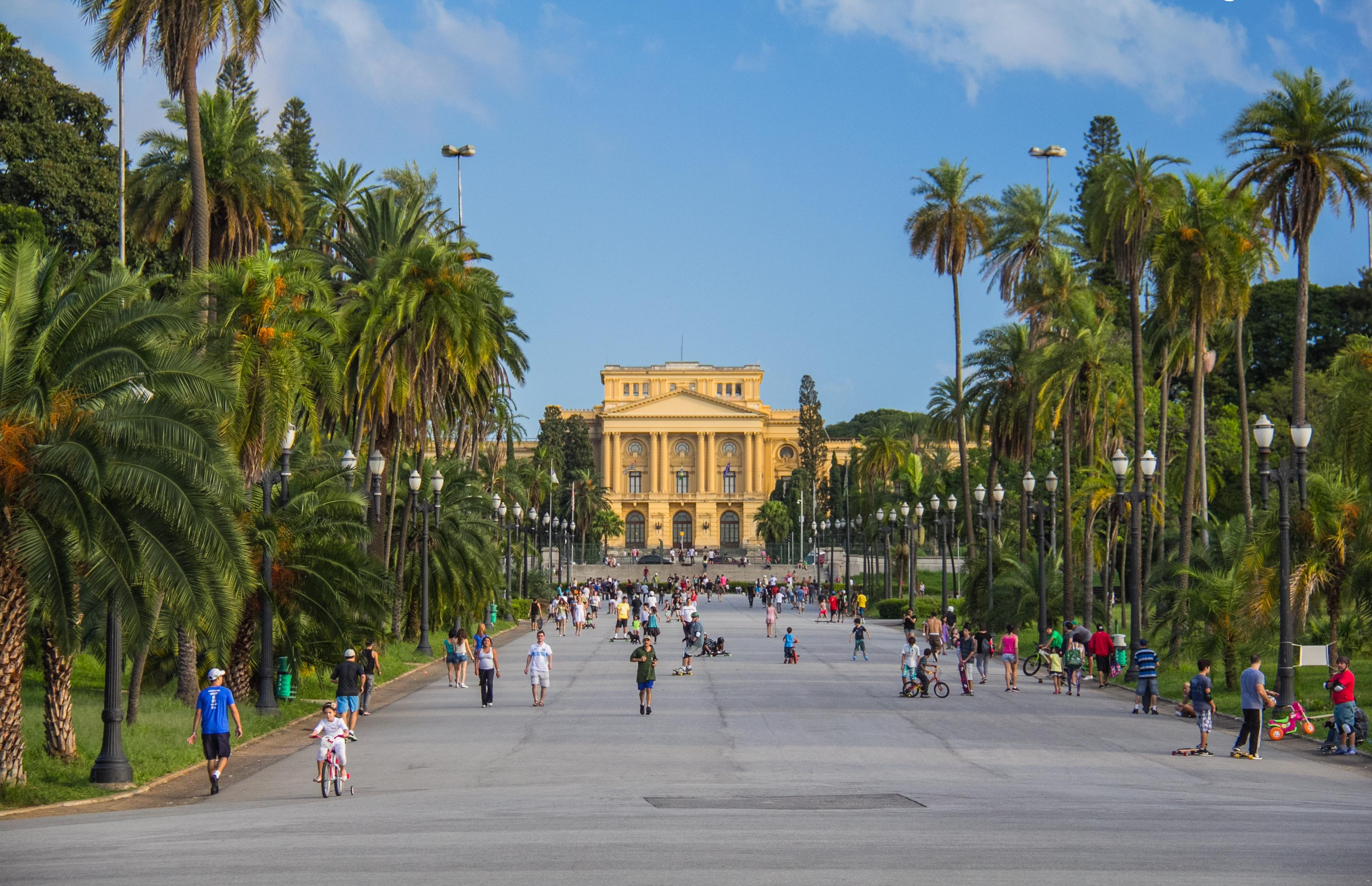
Independence Park in São Paulo, Brazil. This park marks the historic site where Prince Regent Pedro of Braganza (later Emperor Pedro I) proclaimed the independence of Brazil in 1822.

An early purpose built public park was Derby Arboretum which was opened in 1840 by Joseph Strutt for the mill workers and people of the city. This was closely followed by Princes Park in the Liverpool suburb of Toxteth, laid out to the designs of Joseph Paxton from 1842 and opened in 1843. The land on which the Princes park was built was purchased by Richard Vaughan Yates, an iron merchant and philanthropist, in 1841 for £50,000. The creation of Princes Park showed great foresight and introduced a number of highly influential ideas. First and foremost was the provision of open space for the benefit of townspeople and local residents within an area that was being rapidly built up. Secondly it took the concept of the designed landscape as a setting for the suburban domicile, an idea pioneered by John Nash at Regent's Park, and re-fashioned it for the provincial town in a most original way. Nash's remodeling of St James's Park from 1827 and the sequence of processional routes he created to link The Mall with Regent's Park completely transformed the appearance of London's West End. With the establishment of Princes Park in 1842, Joseph Paxton did something similar for the benefit of a provincial town, albeit one of international stature by virtue of its flourishing mercantile contingent. Liverpool had a burgeoning presence on the scene of global maritime trade before 1800 and during the Victorian era its wealth rivaled that of London itself.

The form and layout of Paxton's ornamental grounds, structured about an informal lake within the confines of a serpentine carriageway, put in place the essential elements of his much imitated design for Birkenhead Park. The latter was commenced in 1843 with the help of public finance and deployed the ideas he pioneered at Princes Park on a more expansive scale. Frederick Law Olmsted visited Birkenhead Park in 1850 and praised its qualities. Paxton is widely credited as having been one of the principal influences on Olmsted and Calvert's design for New York's Central Park of 1857.

There are around an estimated 27,000 public parks in the United Kingdom, with around 2.6 billion visits to parks each year. Many are of cultural and historical interest, with 300 registered by Historic England as of national importance. Most public parks have been provided and run by local authorities over the past hundred and seventy years, but these authorities have no statutory duty to fund or maintain these public parks. In 2016 the Heritage Lottery Fund's State of UK Public Parks reported that "92 per cent of park managers report their maintenance budgets have reduced in the past three years and 95 per cent expect their funding will continue to reduce".

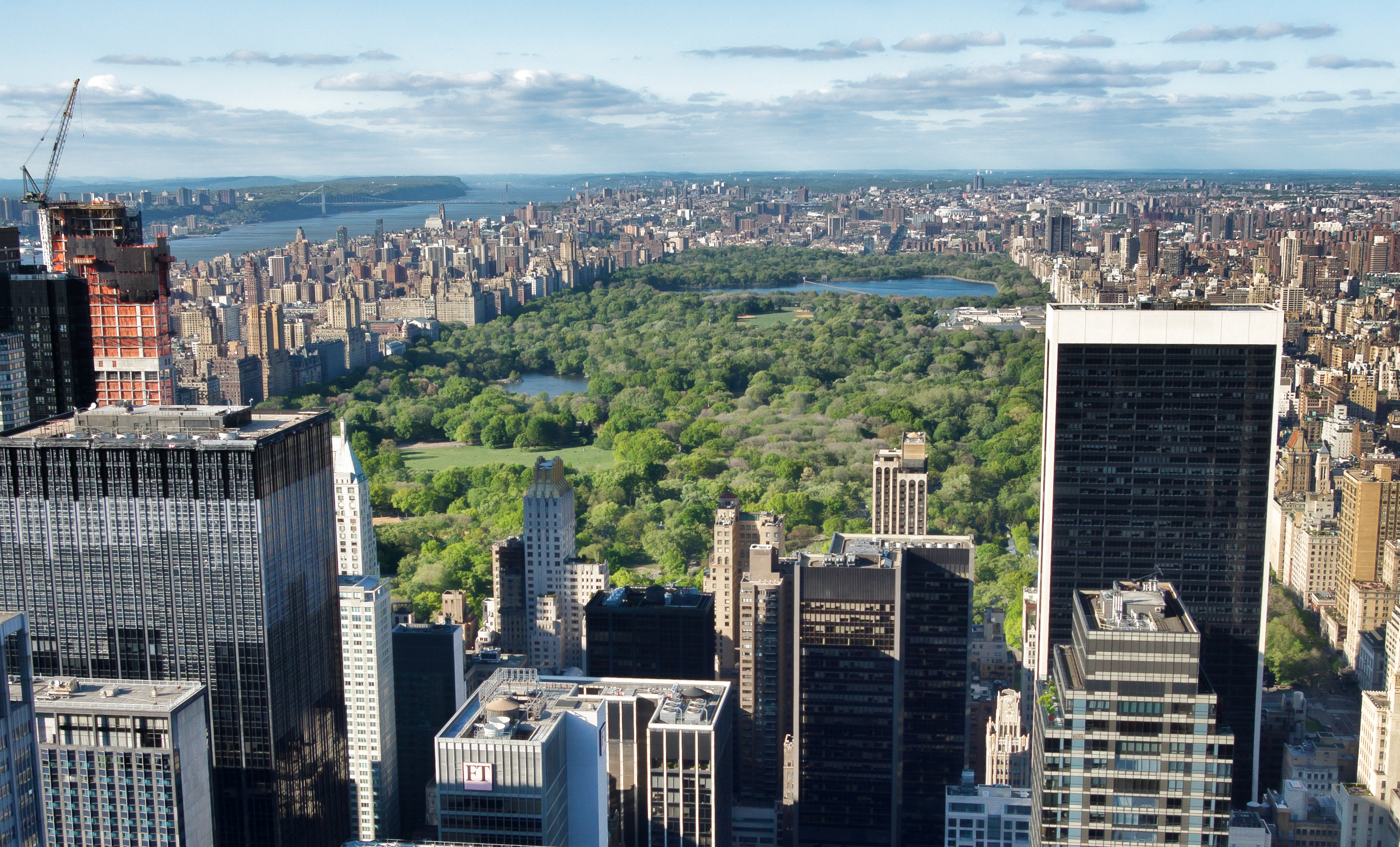
Central Park in New York City is the most-visited urban park in the U.S.

Another early public park is the Peel Park, Salford, England opened on August 22, 1846. Another possible claimant for status as the world's first public park is Boston Common (Boston, Massachusetts, US), set aside in 1634, whose first recreational promenade, Tremont Mall, dates from 1728. True park status for the entire common seems to have emerged no later than 1830, when the grazing of cows was ended and renaming the Common as Washington Park was proposed (renaming the bordering Sentry Street to Park Street in 1808 already acknowledged the reality).

=== Linear parks ===
A linear park is a park that has a much greater length than width. A typical example of a linear park is a section of a former railway that has been converted into a park called a rail trail or greenway (i.e. the tracks removed, vegetation allowed to grow back). Parks are sometimes made out of oddly shaped areas of land, much like the vacant lots that often become city neighborhood parks. Linked parks may form a greenbelt.

=== Country parks ===
In some countries, especially the United Kingdom, country parks are areas designated for recreation, and managed by local authorities. They are often located near urban populations, but they provide recreational facilities typical of the countryside rather than the town.

=== Military parks ===
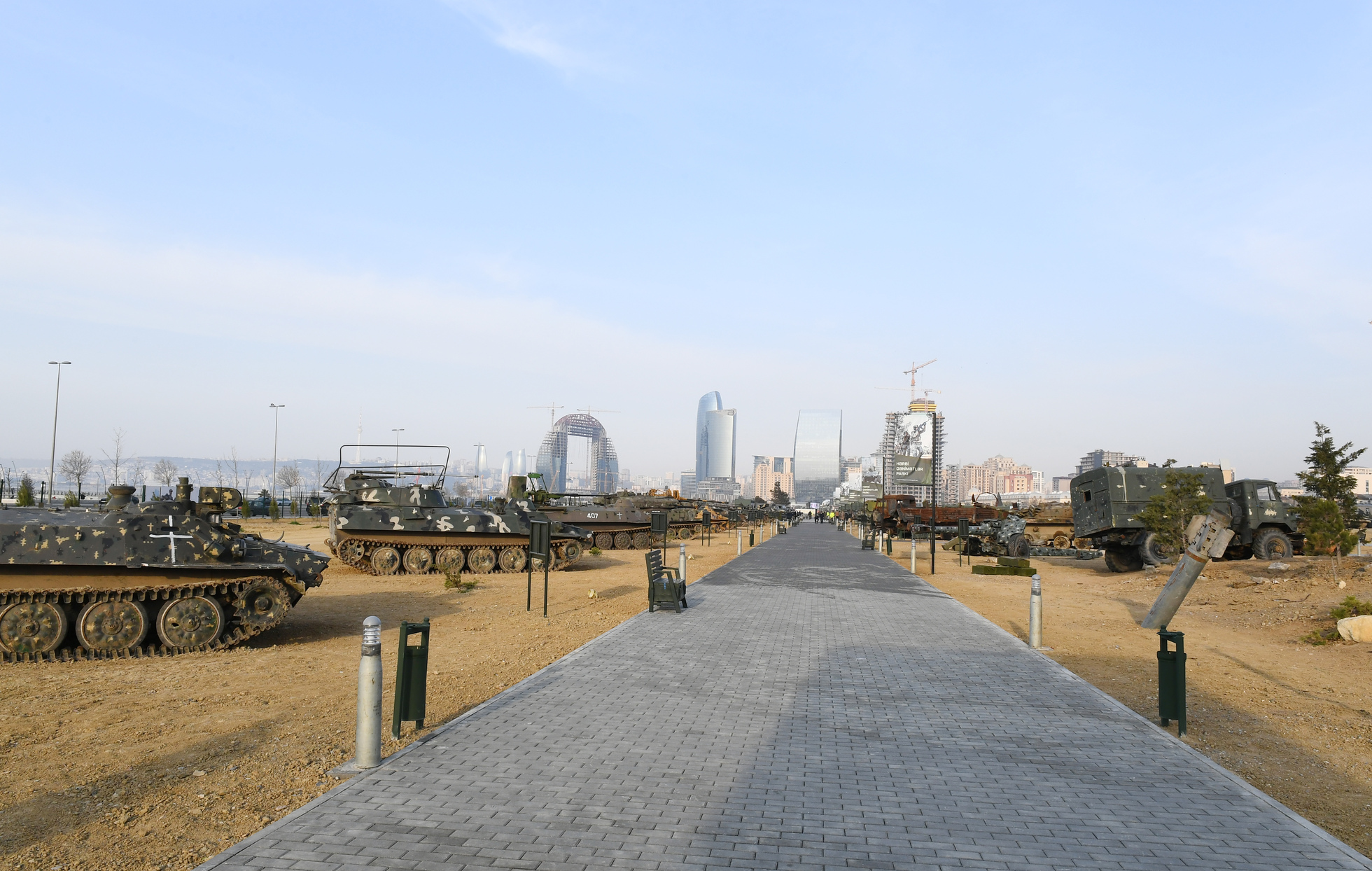
Baku Military Trophy Park in Azerbaijan, which sparked uproar due to display of helmets of Armenian troops and wax mannequins of Armenian soldiers of 2020 Nagorno-Karabakh war.

In 2021, following the 2020 Nagorno-Karabakh war, a Military Trophy Park was opened in Azerbaijan's capital Baku, showcasing seized military equipment, as well as the helmets and wax mannequins of Armenian troops. The helmets were reported by international media to belong to dead Armenian soldiers. Several international journalists have called the park "barbaric". Armenia strongly condemned it, accusing Baku of "dishonoring the memory of victims of the war, missing persons and prisoners of war and violating the rights and dignity of their families". Armenia's ombudsman called it a "clear manifestation of fascism", saying that it is a "proof of Azerbaijani genocidal policy and state supported Armenophobia". Ministry of Foreign Affairs of Azerbaijan stated that such museums are a widely accepted international practice, and the country has a right to commemorate its victory through parades, parks, museums and other means. When Azerbaijani historian Altay Goyushov, one of the leaders of liberal democratic opposition, criticized the helmets corridor, he was rebuffed by local journalists and bloggers who justified demonstrating the helmets, one of them going as far as inviting "all who does not feel well looking at them to go and drown in Caspian sea".

== Private parks ==
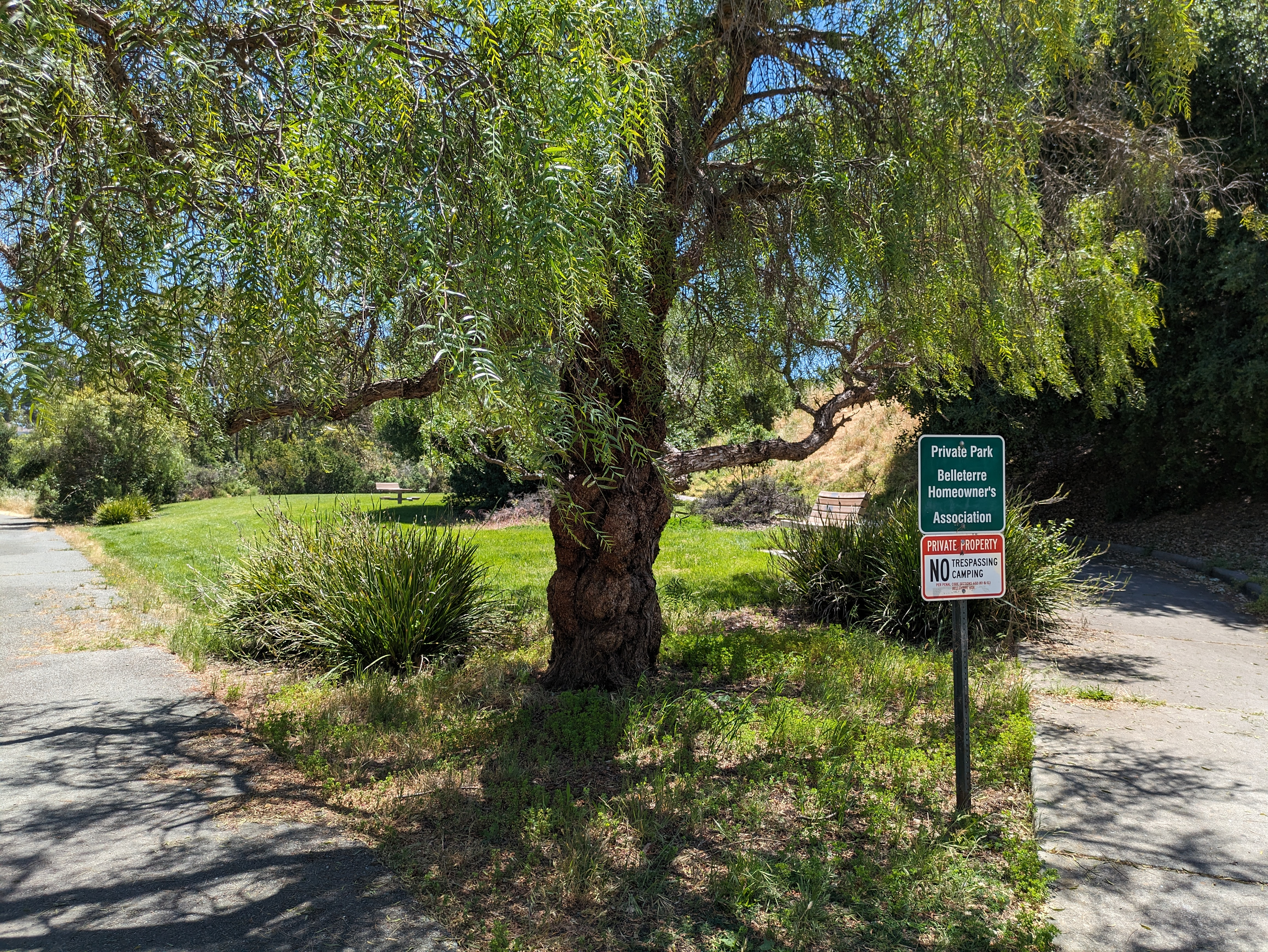
A private park in Hercules, California, United States

Private parks are owned by individuals or businesses and are used at the discretion of the owner. There are a few types of private parks, and some which once were privately maintained and used have now been made open to the public.

Hunting parks were originally areas maintained as open space where residences, industry and farming were not allowed, often originally so that nobility might have a place to hunt – see medieval deer park. These were known for instance, as deer parks (deer being originally a term meaning any wild animal). Many country houses in Great Britain and Ireland still have parks of this sort, which since the 18th century have often been landscaped for aesthetic effect. They are usually a mixture of open grassland with scattered trees and sections of woodland, and are often enclosed by a high wall. The area immediately around the house is the garden. In some cases this will also feature sweeping lawns and scattered trees; the basic difference between a country house's park and its garden is that the park is grazed by animals, but they are excluded from the garden.

== Other park types ==
- Amusement parks have live shows, fairground rides, refreshments, and games of chance/skill.
- Dog parks permit dogs to run off-leash. Parks have differing rules regarding whether dogs can be brought into a park: some parks prohibit dogs; some parks allow them with restrictions (e.g., use of a leash).
- Forest parks are large areas of attractive country with marked paths and special areas for camping.
- Nature park
- Parklet
- Pocket park
- Regional park

== See also ==
- 10-Minute Walk
- Landscape architecture
- Public open space
- Royal forest
- Urban open space
