= Hatanpää =

City district in Tampere, Finland

Coordinates: 61°29′00.06″N 23°45′12.96″E

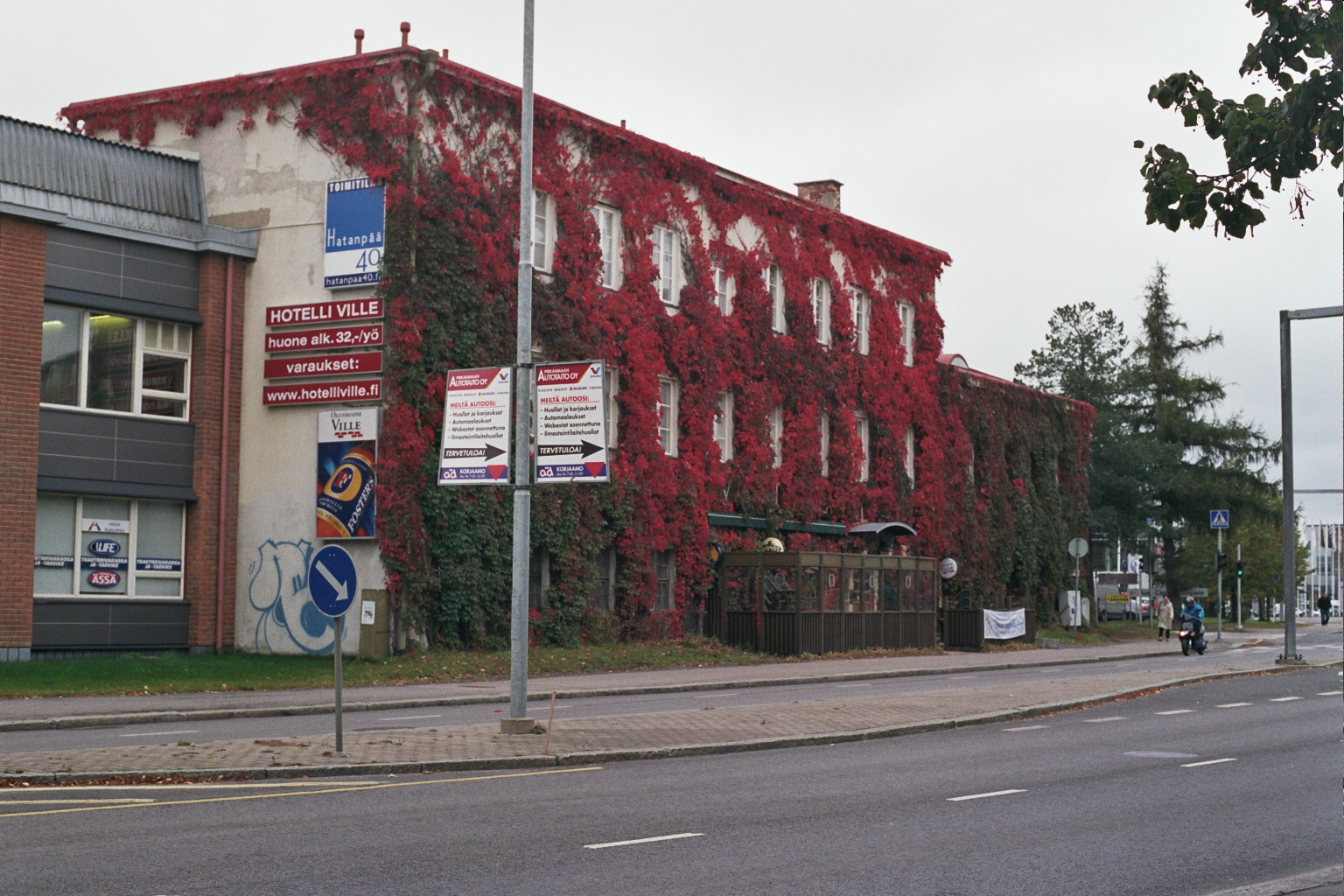
Hotel Ville and pub Oluthuone Ville in Hatanpää

Hatanpää (Finnish pronunciation: [ˈhɑtɑmˌpæː]) is a district in Tampere, Finland, located in the southern part of the city center on the shores of Lake Pyhäjärvi. Hatanpää is actually a peninsula that protrudes towards the lake, leaving the waters of Viinikanlahti Bay to the north and Vihilahti Bay to the south. The area is named after Hatanpää Manor, whose land from Härmälä to Sääksjärvi and Nekala was bought for the city in 1913. Administratively, the area has belonged to the city since 1920. In 2014, the population of the area was measured as 2,686 inhabitants.

Hatanpää is a well-known district because of its many significant sites, including Hatanpää Manor, Hatanpää Park and Hatanpää Arboretum, primary school and high school, and TAYS' second large hospital area, Hatanpää Hospital, as well as a large number of car dealerships and industry. The busy Hatanpää Highway (Hatanpään valtatie), which branches off from Hämeenkatu, leads directly to the area, sideways to the bus station and Viinikanlahti, and strongly divides it in two. On the east side of the road there are industry and car shops, on the west side and closer to the center there are large office buildings and further south the residential area bordering Hatanpää Park. Several IT companies are located in former houses of Nokia in Hatanpää and in former Sarvis properties. In the vicinity of the office buildings is the Viinikka's wastewater treatment plant, which causes local odor nuisances. However, odor nuisances do not affect residential and park areas.

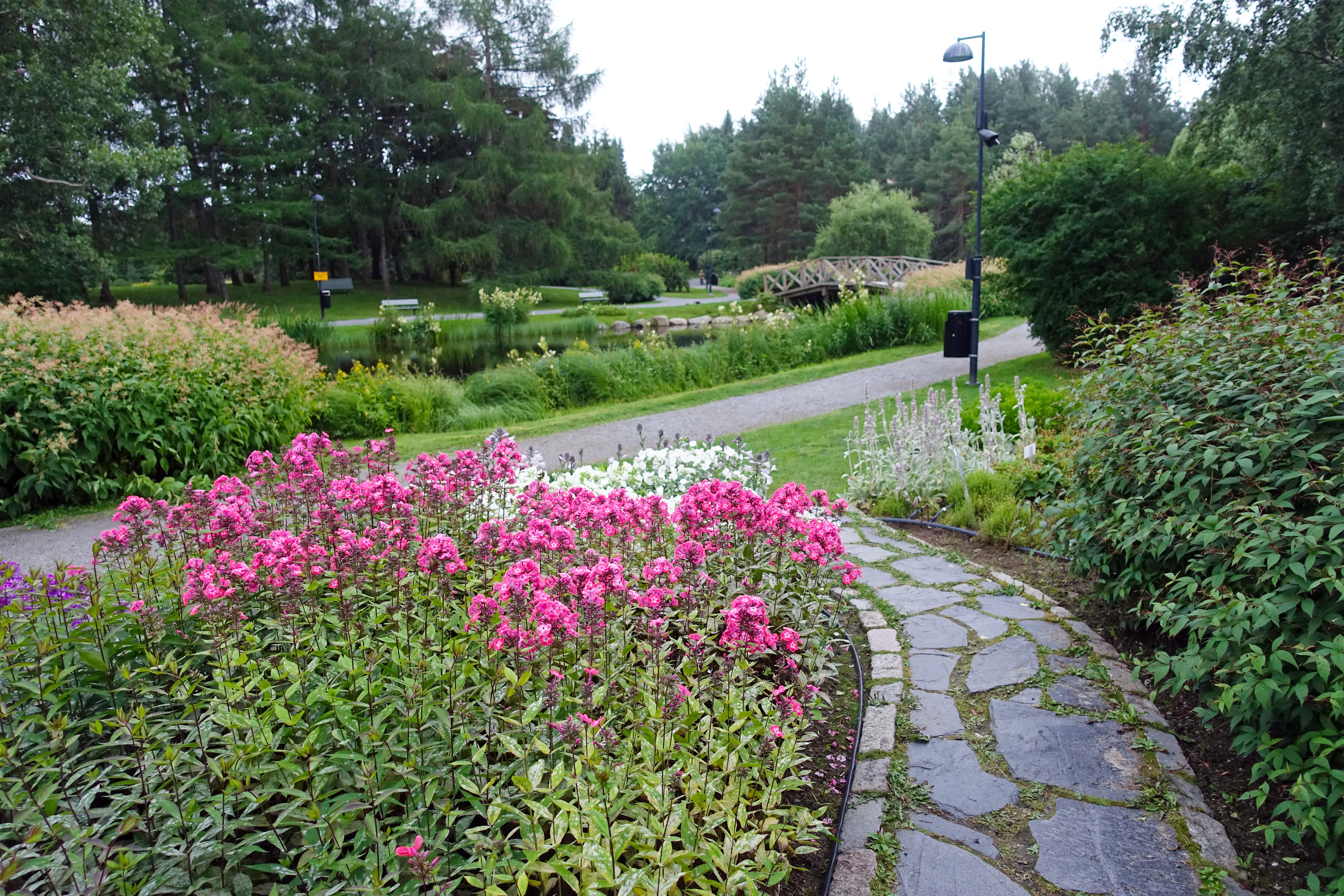
Hatanpää Arboretum

A lot of new things are being built in Hatanpää and this is how the district grows and develops. The water treatment plant will be transferred to a new central treatment plant planned to be started in 2024, which will be excavated in Sulkavuori. A new residential area in Viinikanlahti has been planned for the area of the mobile treatment plant, where an idea competition was held in 2019 and the results were published in 2020. In addition, a new residential area is planned on the old plot of the city's garden unit right next to Hatanpää Park.

== See also ==
- Emil Aaltonen
- Lokomo
- Ratina (district)
