= Hatanpää Manor =

Area in Tampere, Finland

Coordinates: 61°29′00″N 23°45′03″E

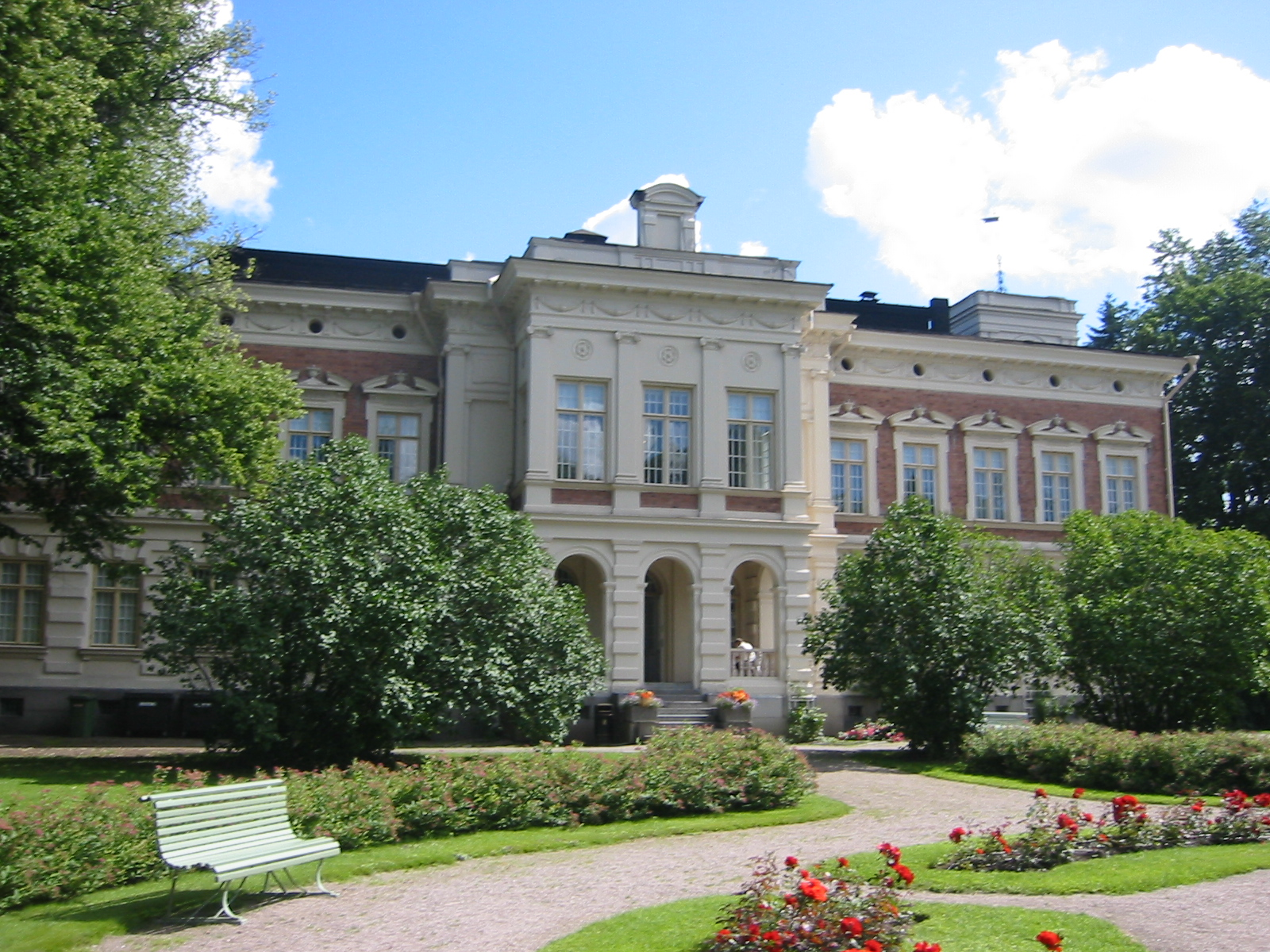
Hatanpää Manor's main building in the Hatanpää Arboretum, a botanical garden in Hatanpää, Tampere

Hatanpää Manor (Finnish: Hatanpään kartano) was a manor within the area of the contemporary city of Tampere on the shores of Lake Pyhäjärvi in Pirkanmaa, Finland. It was founded in the 1690s, and the current main building of Hatanpää Manor, designed by architect Sebastian Gripenberg, was completed in 1885. The manor has preserved the manor park on the Hatanpää's peninsula, as well as the main building and villa building built in the late 19th century. The other former land areas of the manor are now residential and industrial areas.

== History ==
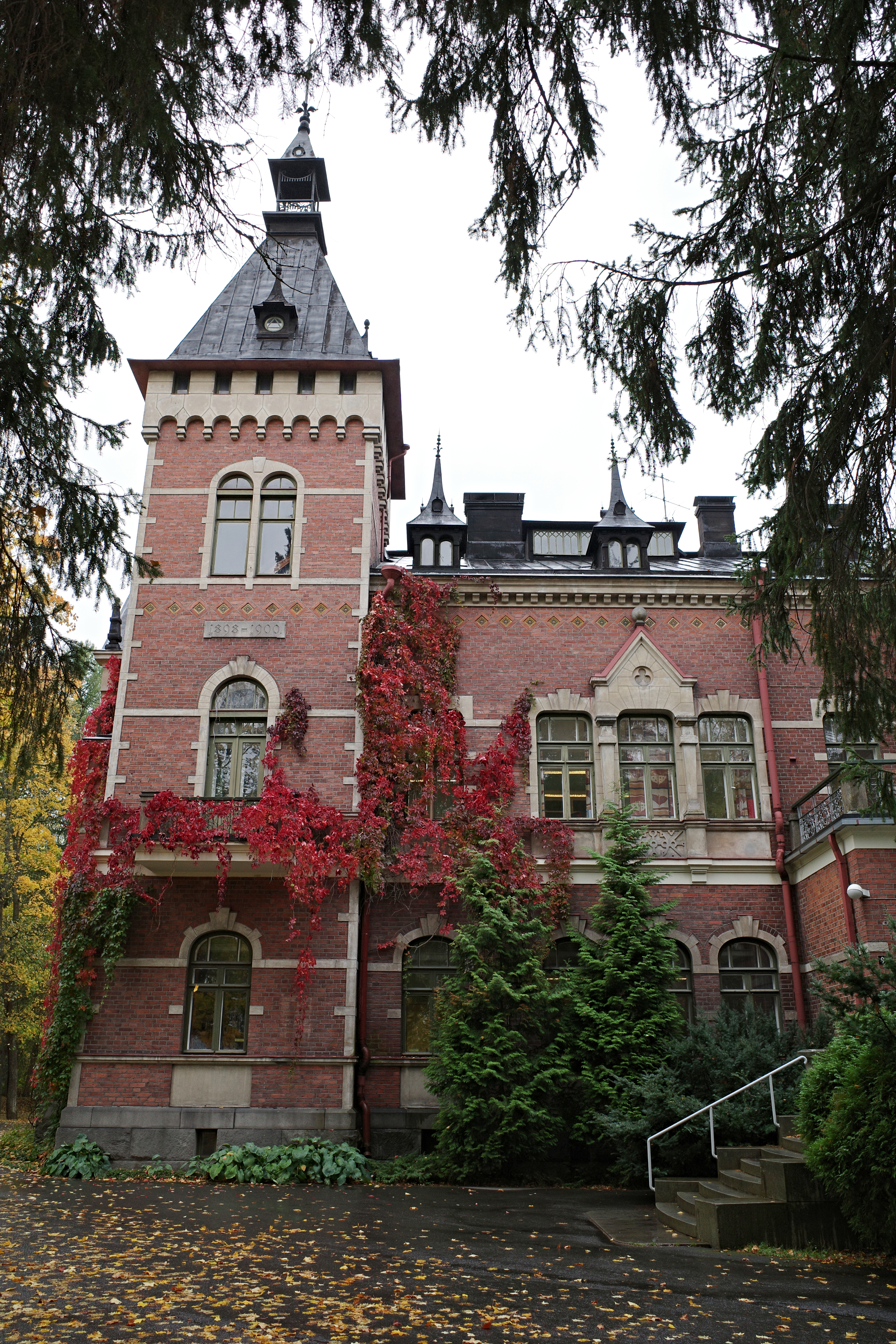
Villa Idman

Hatanpää Manor was created when three houses located in the Hatanpää Peninsula area were merged into a manor in the 1690s. H. H. Boije (1716–1781), one of the early owners of the manor, established an English-style park around the manor, which was maintained by up to 30 gardeners. Boije also experimented with growing white mulberry trees in greenhouses. The leaves of these trees would have fed the larvae of the silk moth, and Boije dreamed of starting his own silk production, inspired by P. A. Gadd (1727–1797), a professor of the Royal Academy of Turku, who may have owned the nearby Kaarila Manor.

During his trip to Finland in 1775, King Gustav III of Sweden was a guest of Boije at the manor and at that time issued an order to establish the city of Tampere on the shores of nearby Tammerkoski. Boije had been involved in the committee planning the establishment of the city and at that time recommended the establishment of the city to the lands of the Tammerkoski manor he owned. Boije sold the Tammerkoski manor to the crown in 1777 as the area of the future city. Shortly afterwards, Boije also sold the Hatanpää manor to tax collector Gabriel Ahlman in 1778 when he moved to Helsinki to become the Governor of Nyland and Tavastehus County. Ahlman practiced traditional farming on the farm; among other things, rye, wheat, barley, oats and peas were cultivated, as well as mixed cereals.

After Ahlman, the farm passed to the ironworks cartridge L. G. Lefren. Lefren owned a paper mill on the shores of Tammerkoski and other industrial companies. After Lefren's death, the manor was bought in 1835 by lawspeaker and knight N. J. Idman, and the manor remained under the control of the Idman family until 1913. The last owner of the manor belonging to the Idman family was the grandson of the aforementioned, F. L. Idman, who had graduated as an agronomist from the Mustiala School of Agriculture in 1893. In 1913, the entire 1,459-hectare Hatanpää Manor was sold for FIM 2.5 million to the city of Tampere. The buildings of the manor were taken into hospital use in 1916, and in the 1930s the Hatanpää Hospital, designed by architect Bertel Strömmer, was completed in the area of the manor. The main building of the manor has been used by the Tampere City Museum since 1970.

== Building and garden ==
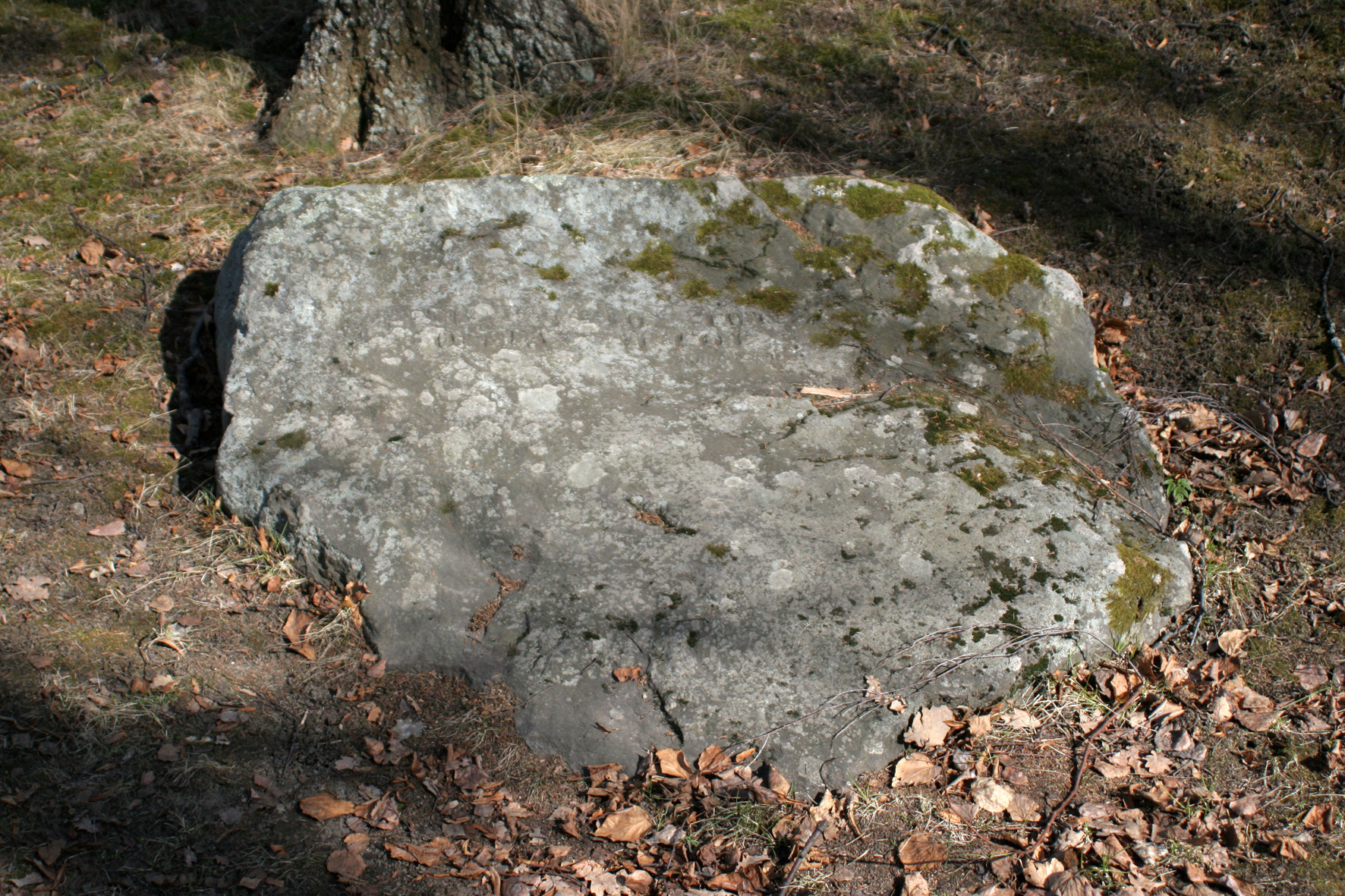
The “Freemason's Grave”

The manor house currently serves as a party, meeting and other event venue, and Juvenes-Yhtiöt Oy is responsible for the service. In 2016, the facade was renovated at a cost of approximately EUR 1.1 million. During the renovation, the colors of the facades were restored as close as possible to the original ones, as well as the original exterior frames of the wooden windows, which were replaced in the 1990s. In addition, the damaged plaster decorations were renovated, and at the same time the manor received new facade lighting.

Next to Hatanpää Manor is the Hatanpää Park. The Hatanpää headland, next to the actual manor park, has also had an arboretum, a tree species park and a rose garden since the 1970s. In the park of the manor there is a large natural stone with the Greek text “Egno Kyrios tous Ontas autou” (English: “The Lord Knows His Own”). The engraving is thought to date from the 18th century in the time of Boije and was possibly made during the visit of King Gustav III in 1775. Boije and the king were both Freemasons. The stone is known as the “Freemason's Grave” (Finnish: Vapaamuurarin hauta), although no one has been buried on the site.

== See also ==
- Näsilinna

== Sources ==
- Hatanpää Manor at Film Tampere
- History of Hatanpää Manor (in Finnish)
