= Hatanpää Arboretum =

Botanical garden in Tampere, Finland

Coordinates: 61°28′57″N 23°45′00″E

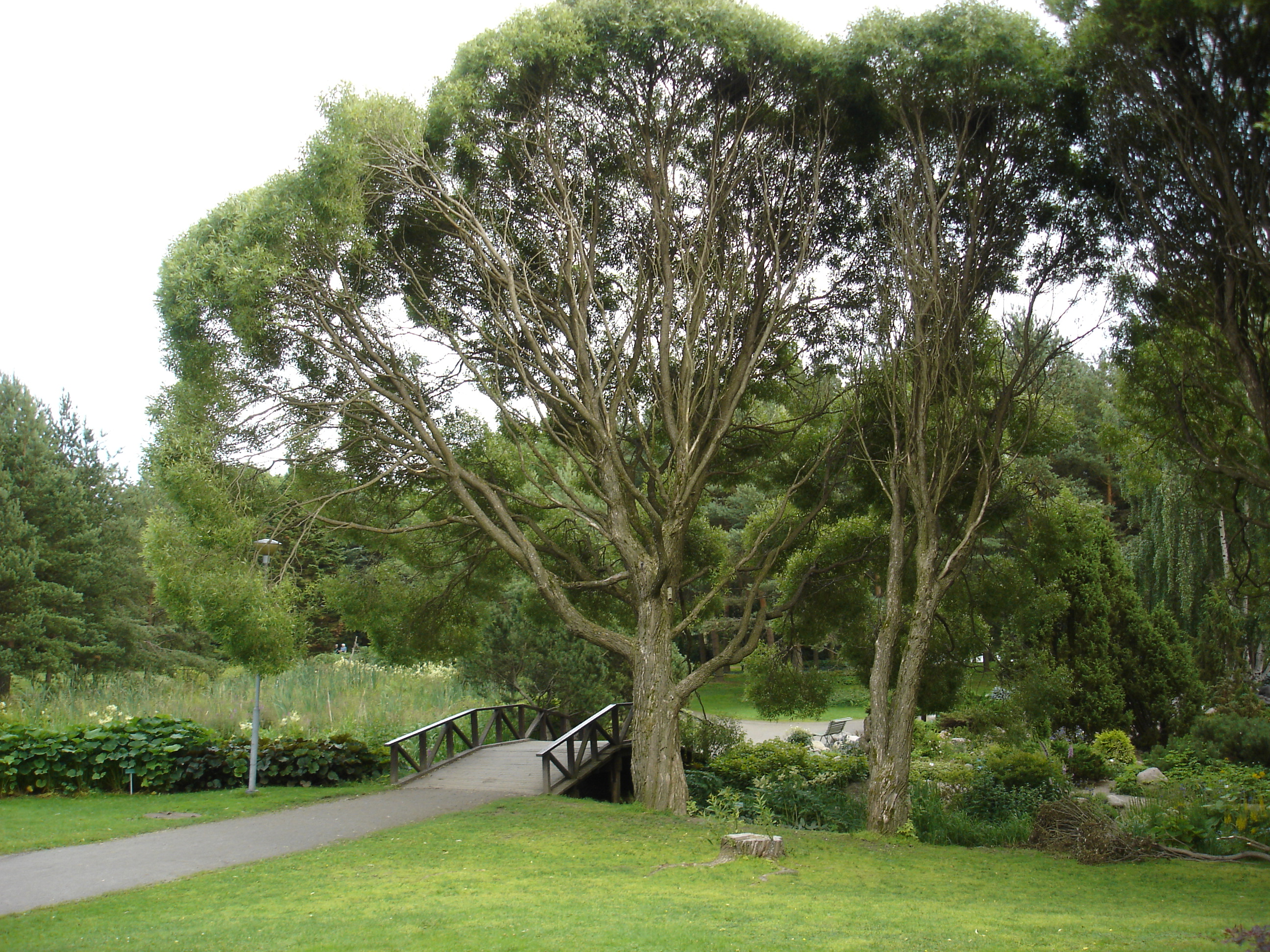
Hatanpää Arboretum, a botanical garden in Tampere

Hatanpää Arboretum (officially called Hatanpää Park Arboretum) is an arboretum and botanical garden located in Hatanpää, Tampere, Finland, and was founded in the 1970s on the lands of the former Hatanpää Manor. The park area is planted with several different species of trees, shrubs and flowers and is provided with nameplates to facilitate identification. The arboretum is a popular recreation area and the rose garden with its many rose species is an attraction.

== Gallery ==
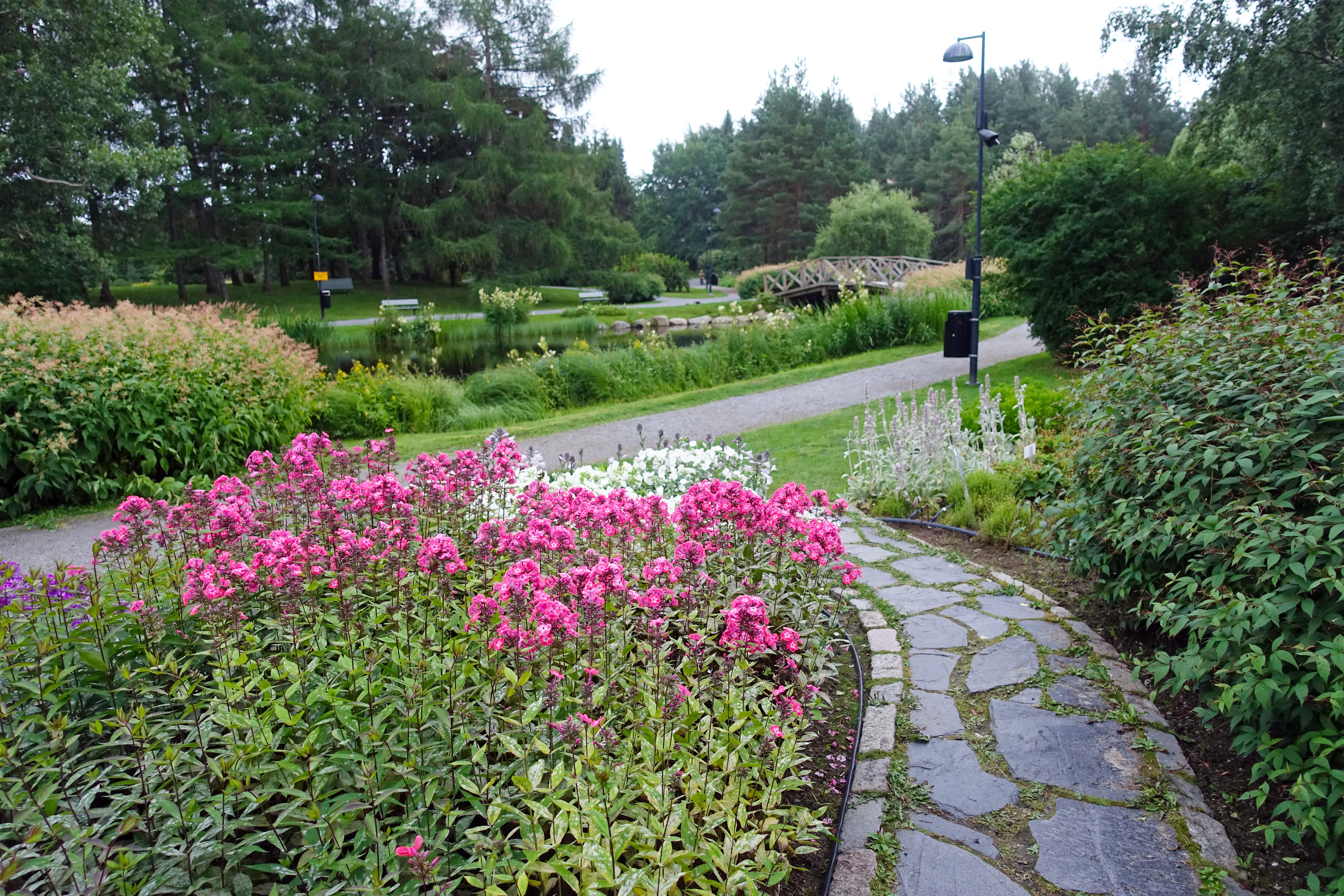

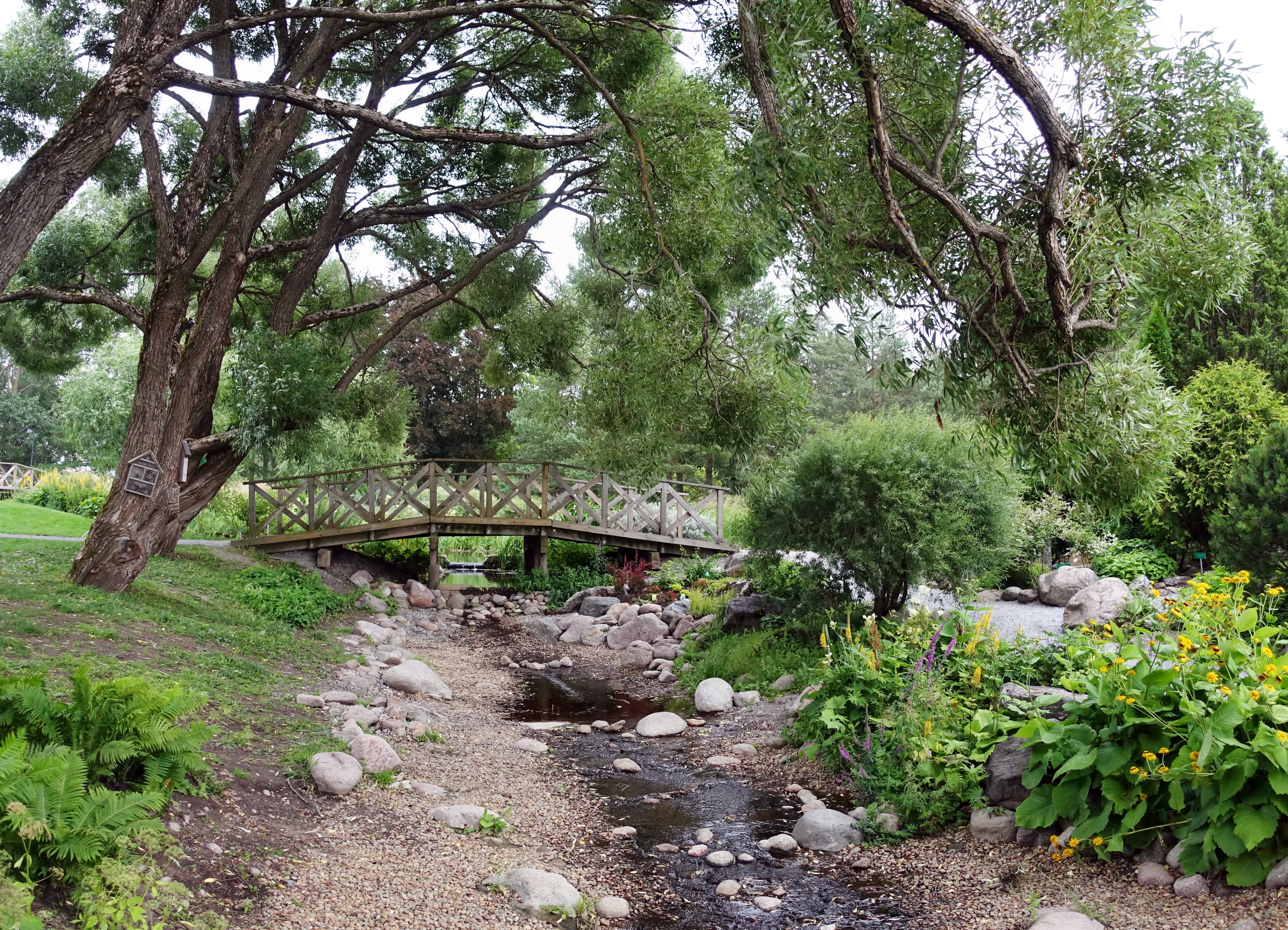

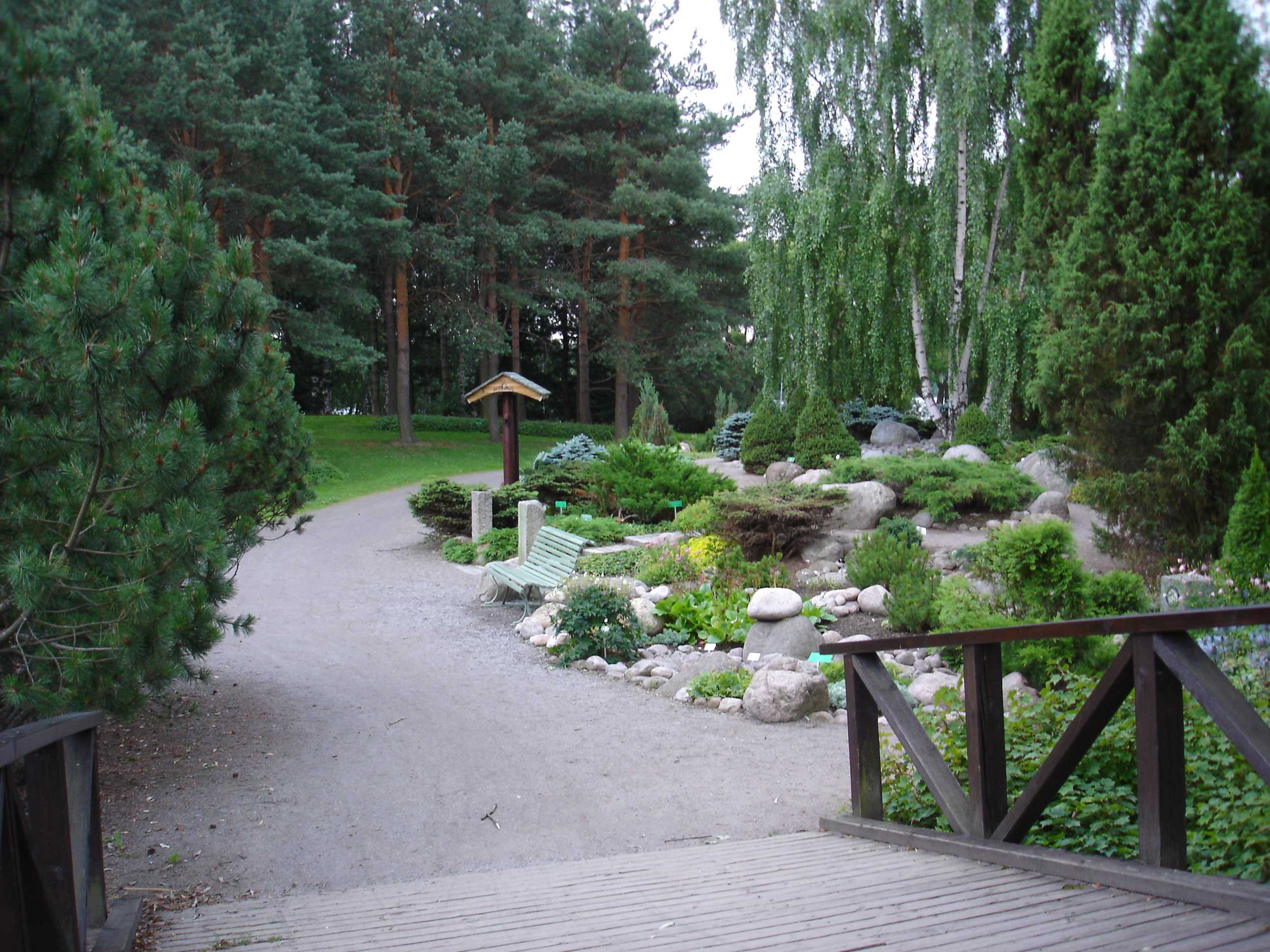

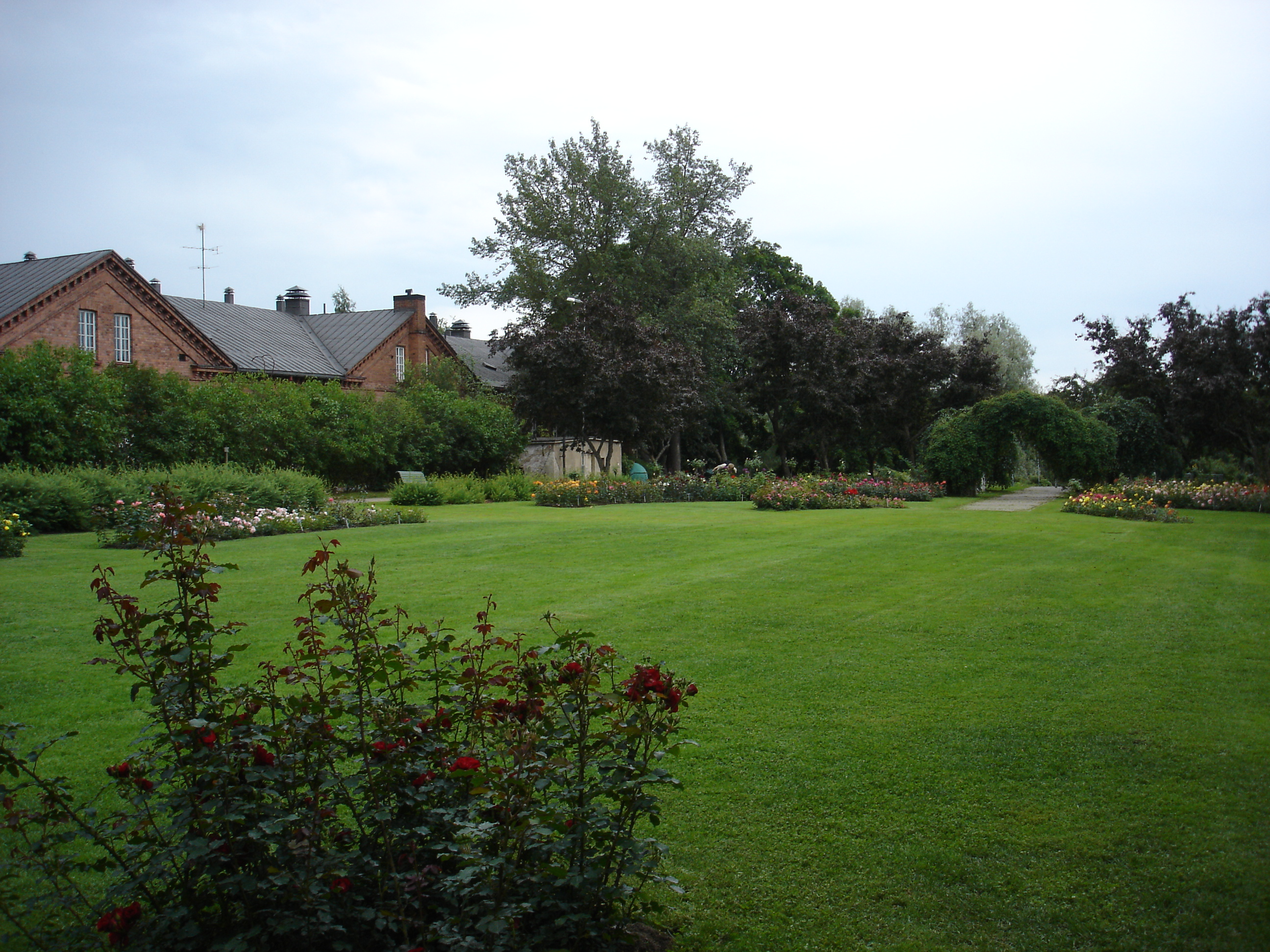

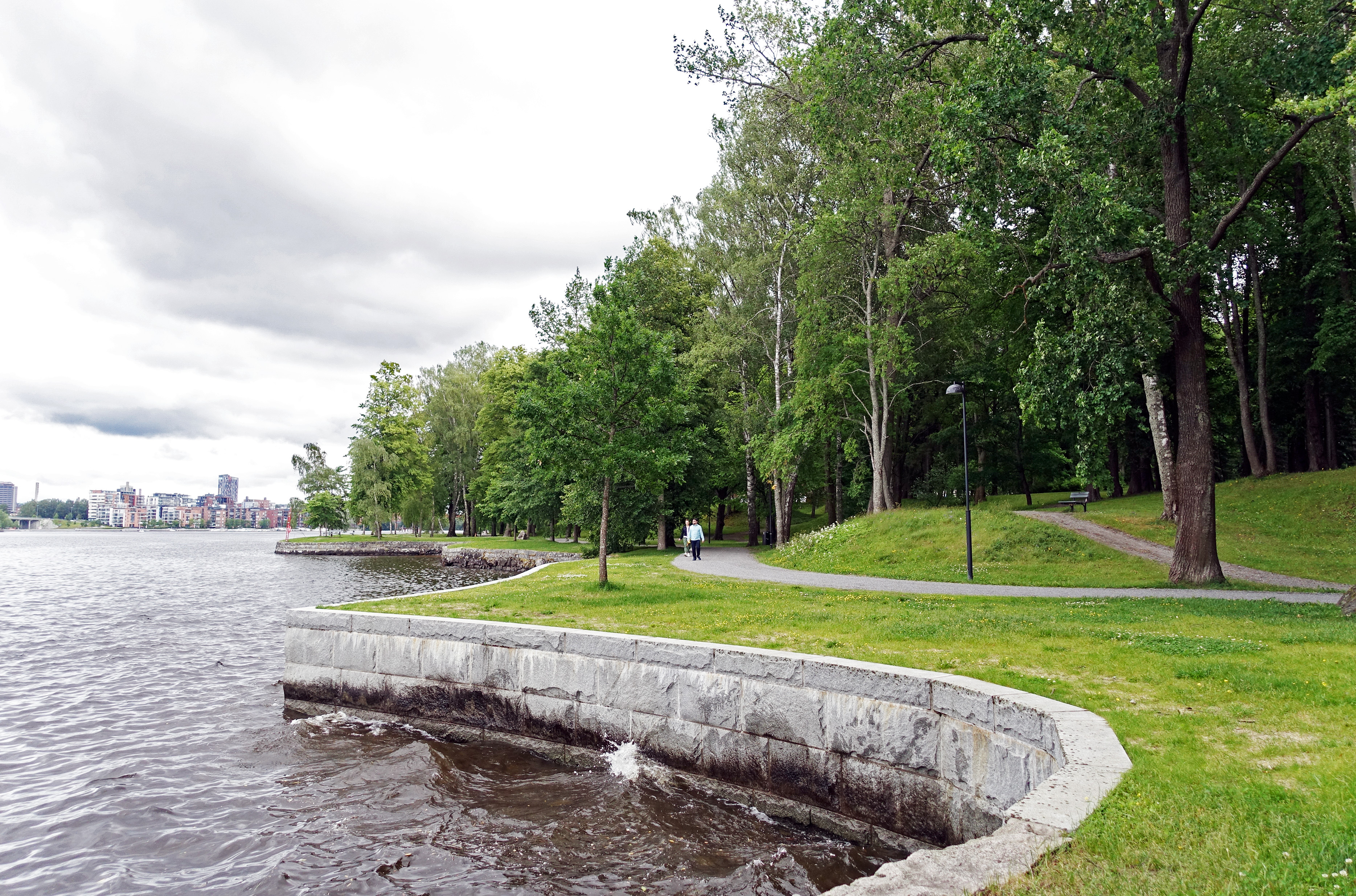

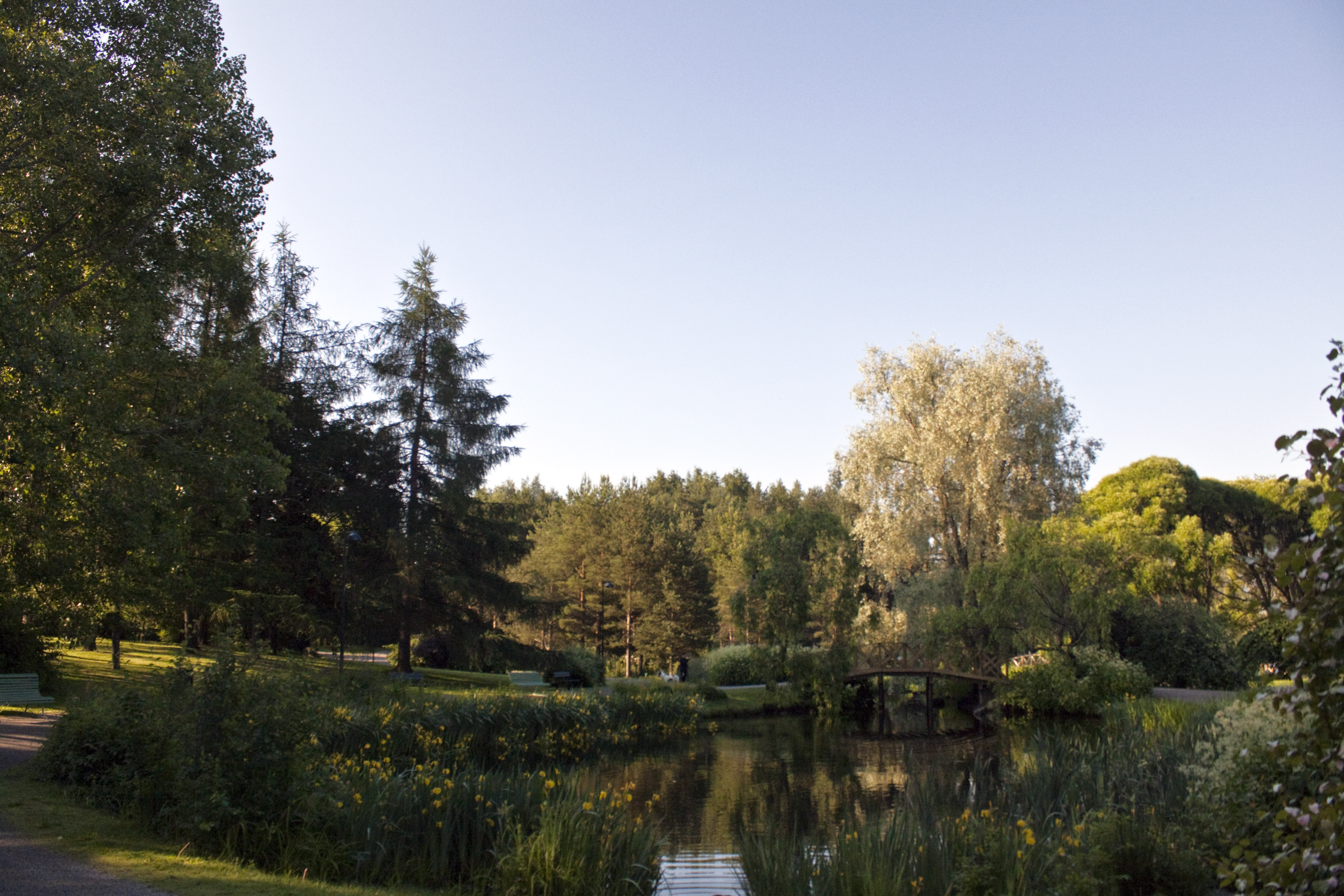

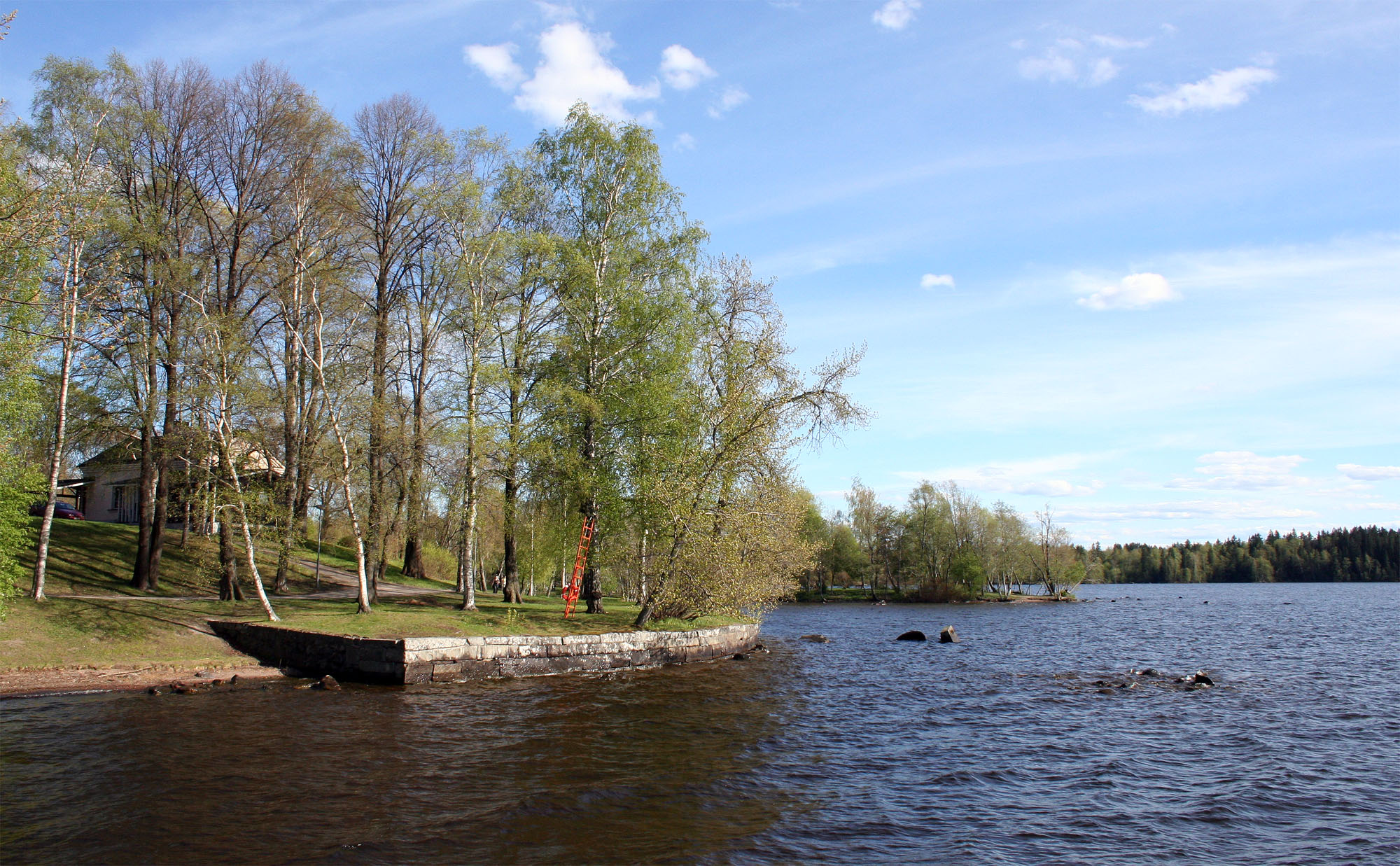
