= Duo (shopping mall) =

Shopping mall in Hervanta, Finland

- Kauppakeskus Duo
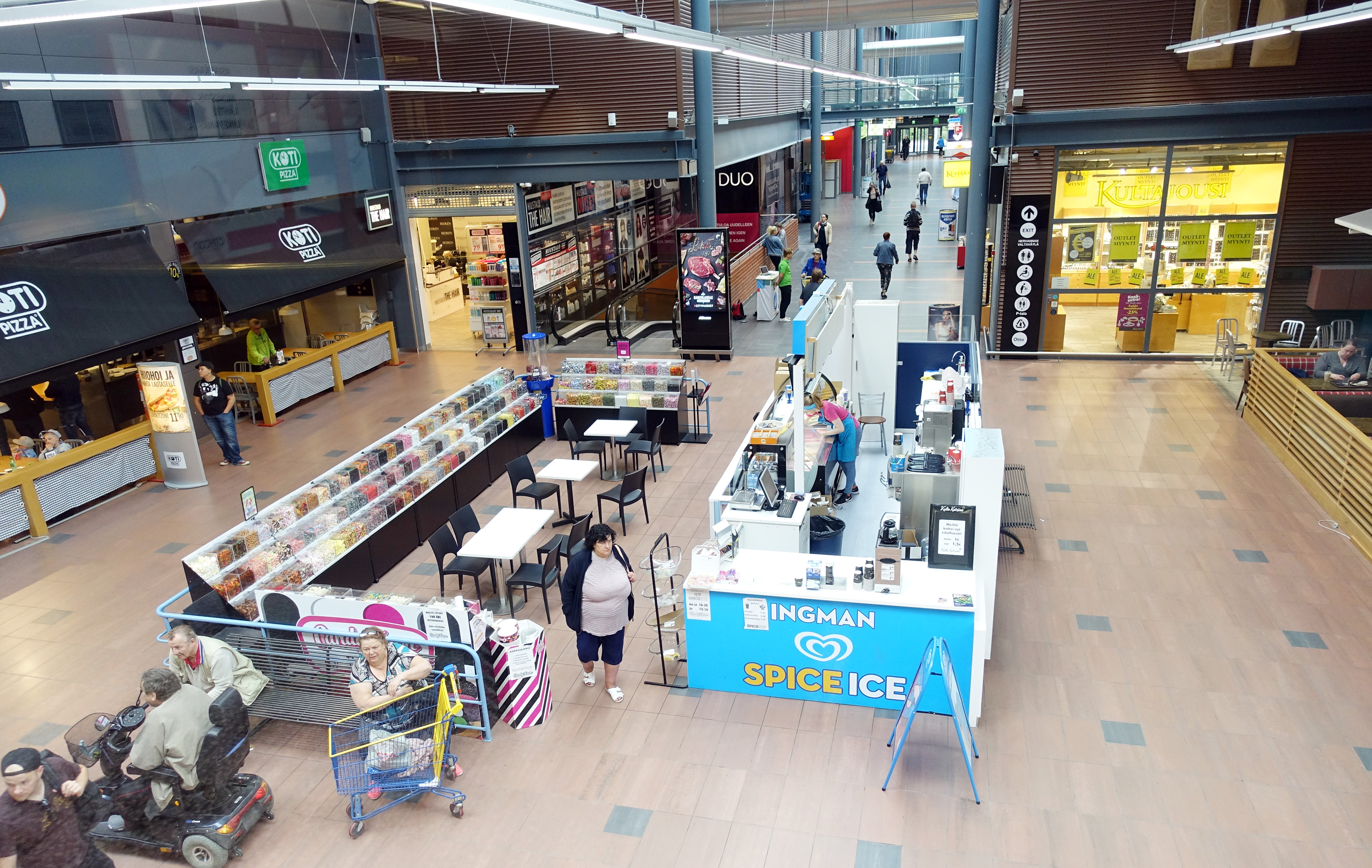
- Interior of Duo
- Location: Hervanta, Tampere, Finland
- Coordinates: 61°27′03.2″N 23°51′02.3″E
- Address: Pietilänkatu 2
- Opened: 1979
- Owner: NREP
- Architect: Raili Pietilä and Reima Pietilä; Eero Lahti (extension)
- Num. of stores: 31
- Num. of anchor tenants: 5
- Floor area: 21,600 m^{2}
- Floors: 2
- Parking: 380
- Website: kauppakeskusduo.fi/en/

Duo (originally Hervantakeskus) is a shopping center located in Hervanta, Tampere, Finland. Its original part was designed by the architects Raili and Reima Pietilä, and was completed in the autumn of 1979. Duo has three large grocery stores: Lidl, S-market and K-Supermarket. In addition, there are Alko and Tokmanni as well as restaurants, specialty shops and other commercial services. There is an underground parking garage on the ground floor. There is a total of 11,700 square meters of retail space for rent in the shopping center.

The shopping center is part of the central axis of Hervanta designed by Pietilä, which is a nationally significant entity of public buildings. It was once intended to improve Hervanta's concrete-like appearance. The old part of the shopping center, designed by Raili and Reima Pietilä, has features that are characteristic of the architecture and Art Nouveau style of the turn of the 19th and 20th centuries. The building can be described as a mix of a European market hall, a train station and a winter garden. The fountain structure and the large windows, in turn, are elements that point to the era of large European department stores.

In 2007, an extension designed by Arkkitehtitoimisto Eero Lahti Oy was completed for the shopping center, doubling its size. The opening of the new section was held in April, and the renovation of the old section was completed towards the end of the year. The business center was renamed Duo, which indicates that the building consists of two parts, the new and the old side. In 2019, the real estate investment company Citycon sold its holdings in the shopping center to the real estate investment company NREP.
