= Presidential Palace, Helsinki =

Presidential Palace
- Presidentinlinna (in Finnish); Presidentens slott (in Swedish)
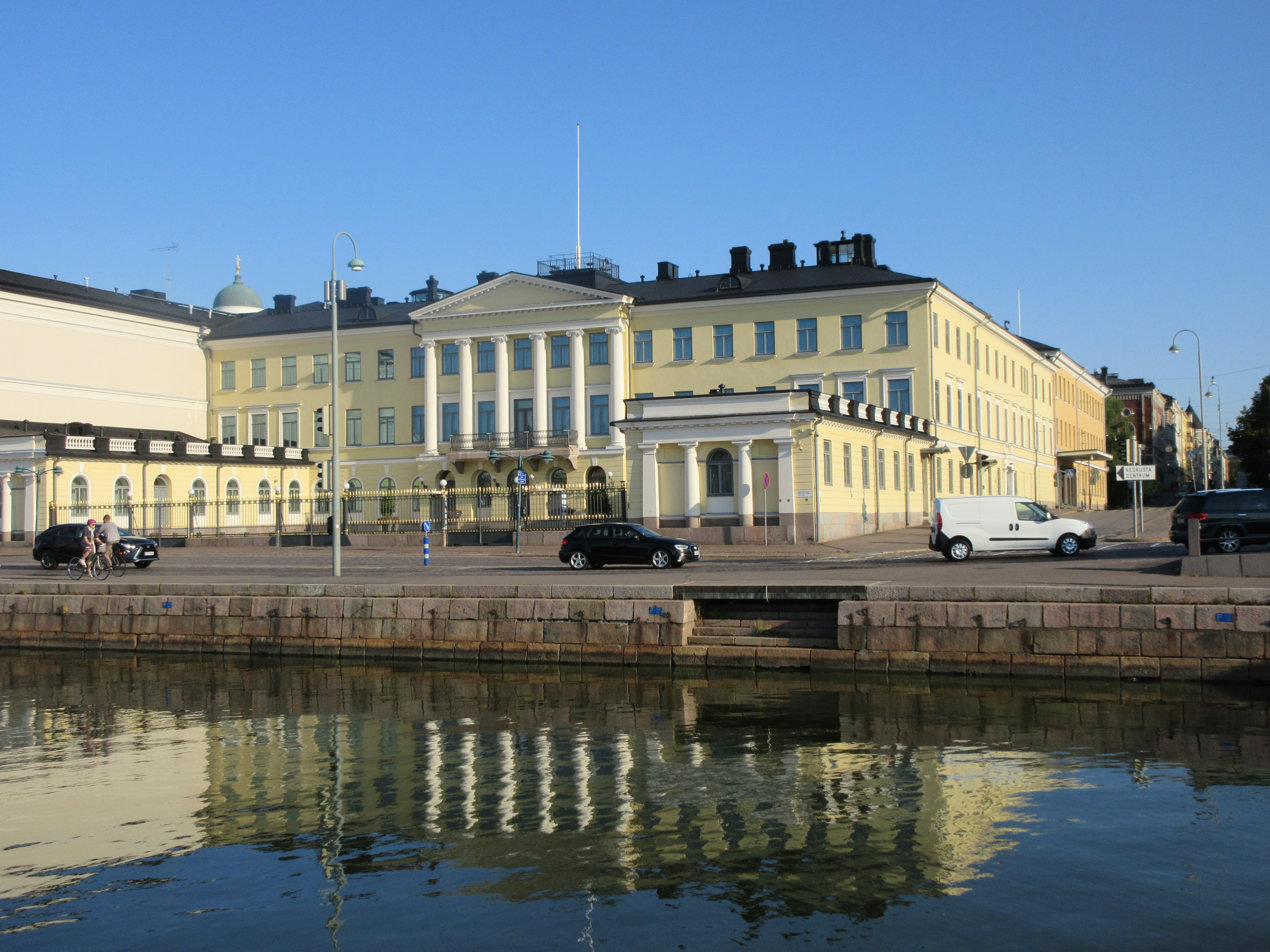
- Interactive map of the Presidential Palace area

General information
- Type: Governmental
- Architectural style: Neoclassical
- Location: Kruununhaka, Helsinki, Finland
- Coordinates: 60°10′06″N 24°57′22.5″E
- Construction started: 1816 / 1843
- Completed: 1820 / 1845
- Owner: Government of Finland
- Landlord: President of Finland

Design and construction
- Architects: Pehr Granstedt (1816); Carl Ludvig Engel (1843)

The Presidential Palace (Finnish: Presidentinlinna, Swedish: Presidentens slott) is one of the three official residences of the president of the Republic of Finland. It is situated in Helsinki, on the north side of Esplanadi, overlooking Market Square.

== Origins and early history ==
In the early 19th century, a salt storehouse stood on the site where one of Helsinki's most prominent merchants, Johan Henrik Heidenstrauch, would soon build his stately home. He purchased the entire lot and between 1816 and 1820 a stately residence designed by architect Pehr Granstedt was built. Upon its completion, the Heidenstrauch residence was astonishingly grand, resembling a palace more than a merchant's home. With its two wings and a central section featuring a hall with a stately column-lined and framed beam ceiling, the house was a masterful work of proportion and design.

In 1837, the Heidenstrauch's residence was purchased for the price of 170 000 rubles to be converted into a residence for the Governor-General of Finland. However, Nicholas I desired that it should become the official residence in Helsinki of the Emperor of Russia, the Grand Duke of Finland, and so the building became the Imperial Palace in Helsinki.

The necessary rebuilding and furnishing work, carried out between 1843 and 1845, was directed by architect Carl Ludvig Engel, the creator of neoclassical Helsinki and, after his death, by his son, Carl Alexander. Giacomo Quarenghi also looked over the plans. All the timber storehouses behind were torn down and a new wing added. This wing, built along the north of the courtyard, contained on the second floor the chapel (the present library), ballroom, banquet hall in direct connection with the earlier reception floor of the main building, as well as a kitchen.

== Imperial Palace ==
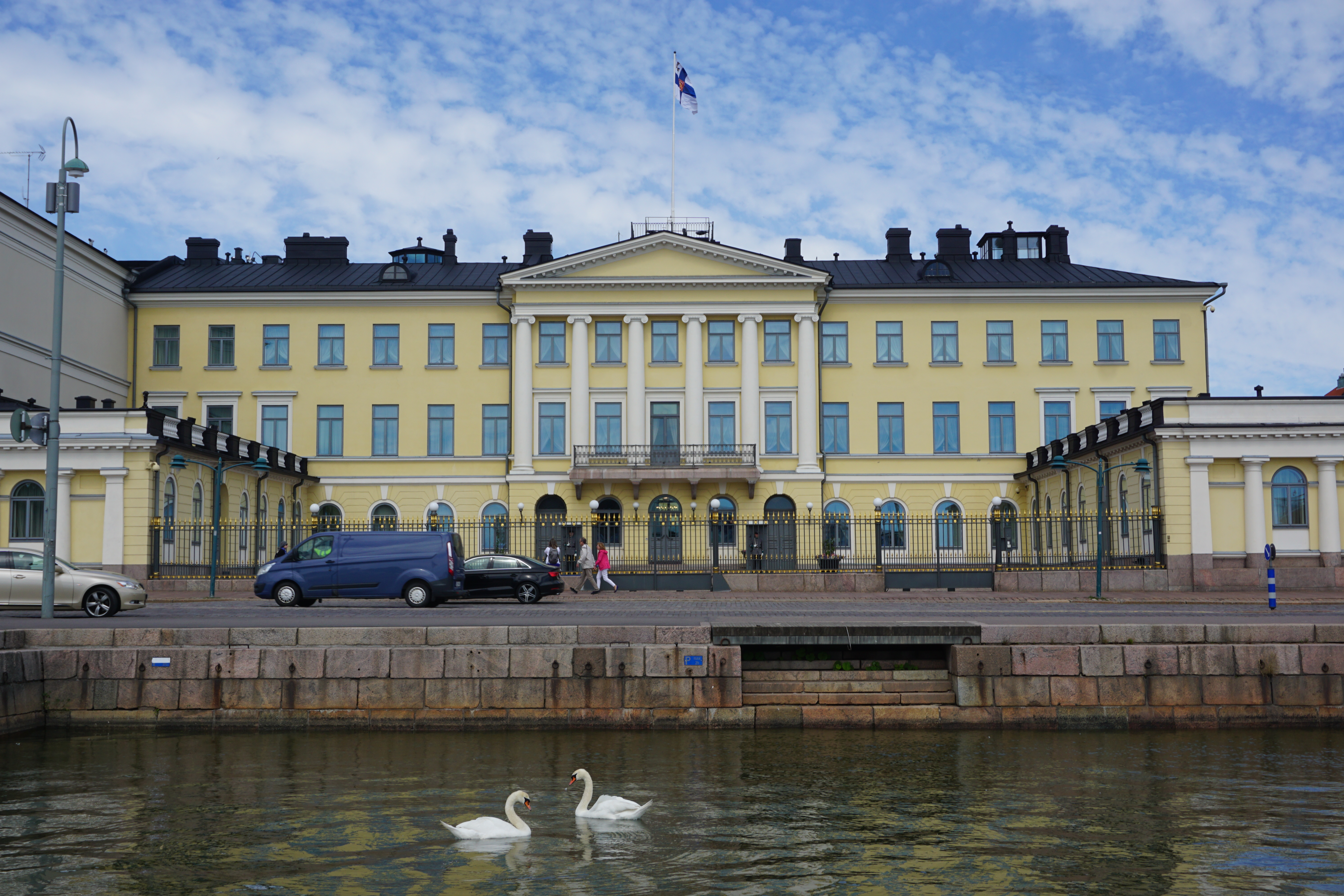
Swans swimming in front of the building

The palace was completed in 1845, though repairs had to be made from time to time as mostly it stood empty and was not regularly heated. It was visited for the first time by a member of the Imperial family nine years later, in February 1854, when Emperor Nicholas I's younger son, Grand Duke Constantine, stayed there for a month. His brother Nicholas stayed there in June of the following year, after Nicholas I's death. In 1856, the palace was also visited by the new Emperor's three oldest sons – Nicholas, Alexander, and Vladimir. It was during the reign of their father, Alexander II, that the palace had its most brilliant time. He visited the city in 1863 and 1876, staying on both occasions at the palace. In 1863 the Diet of Finland was opened by Alexander II in the Great Ballroom. The Ballroom was accordingly converted into a Throne-Room, with the Imperial throne placed on a dais. Alexander returned to the palace again in 1876 to open that year's session of the Diet. The Throne-Room continued to be used as the venue for the opening and closing ceremonies of the Diet until 1906.

That was the last Imperial festivity in the palace. Alexander III did stay there in 1885 (although he resided at his Finnish residence in Langinkoski more often). The palace was refurbished during 1904–1907 by Johan Jacob Ahrenberg. He built a new suite of reception rooms, including a new Throne Room (the present Hall of State) where the sculpture Psyche and Zephyr by Walter Runeberg was placed, and a reception vestibule facing Mariankatu. The palace was last visited by a member of the Imperial family when Nicholas II visited the palace for one day in 1915.

== Post-imperial use ==
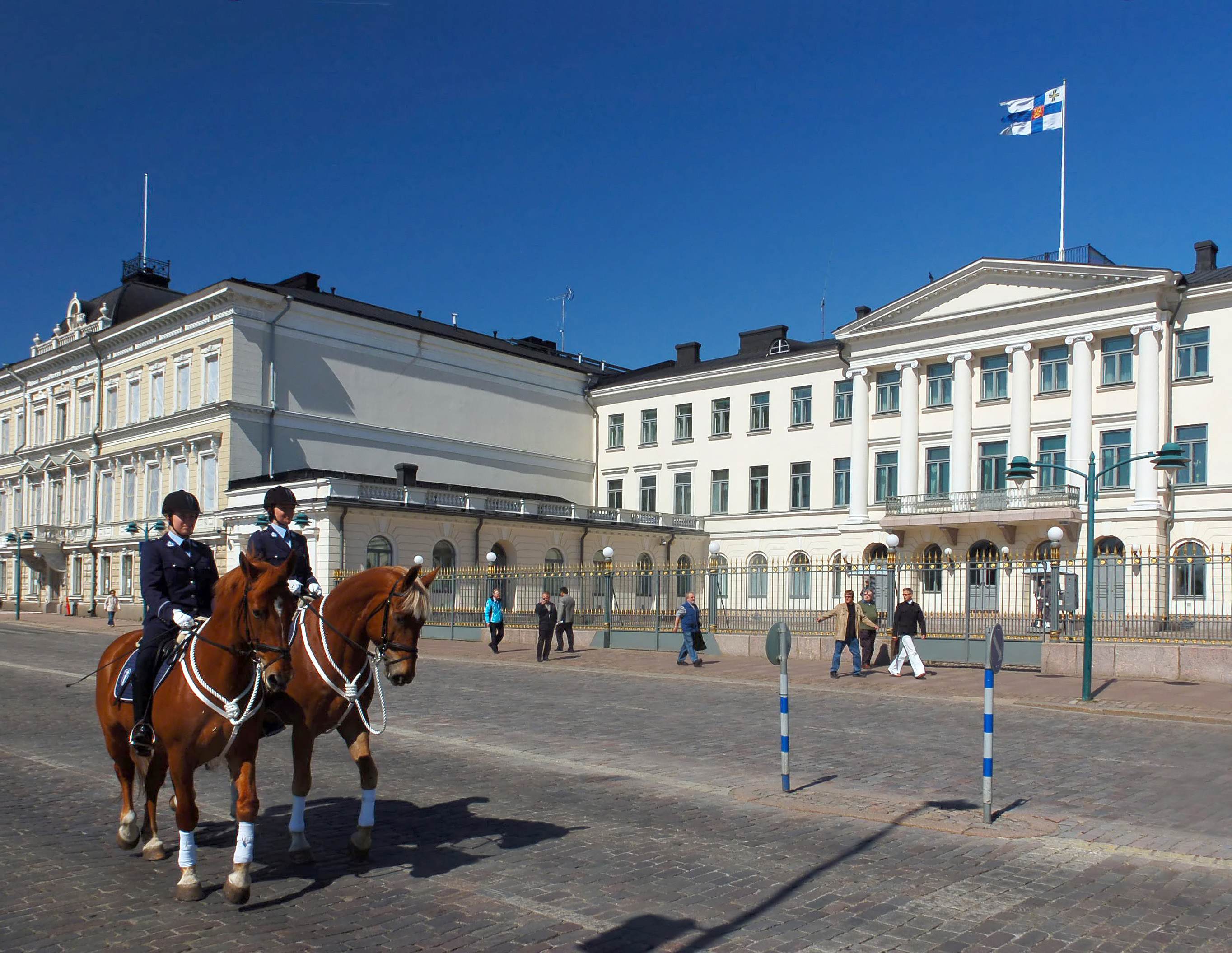
Mounted police officers patrolling the premises

Under the political conditions of World War I the palace was converted into Helsinki Temporary Military Hospital I in October 1915. With the February Revolution of 1917 and the abdication of the Emperor/Grand Duke, the palace ceased to be a military hospital and became the property of the Senate which renamed it as the Former Imperial Palace. From March to April 1918, the palace was used as the headquarters of the executive committee of the Helsinki Workers and Soldiers Soviet. With the victory of the Whites in the Finnish Civil War, the Reds abandoned the Palace, which was temporarily used by German and White Finnish military staff. From June 1918 onwards, renovations and repairs were made to the palace in anticipation of its role as a royal residence for Prince Frederick of Hesse, who was elected as king of Finland in October 1918. However, the international political situation in the aftermath of World War I led to him renouncing his acceptance of the Finnish throne in December 1918. Following this, the upper floors served as the Ministry for Foreign Affairs.

== Presidential Palace and office ==
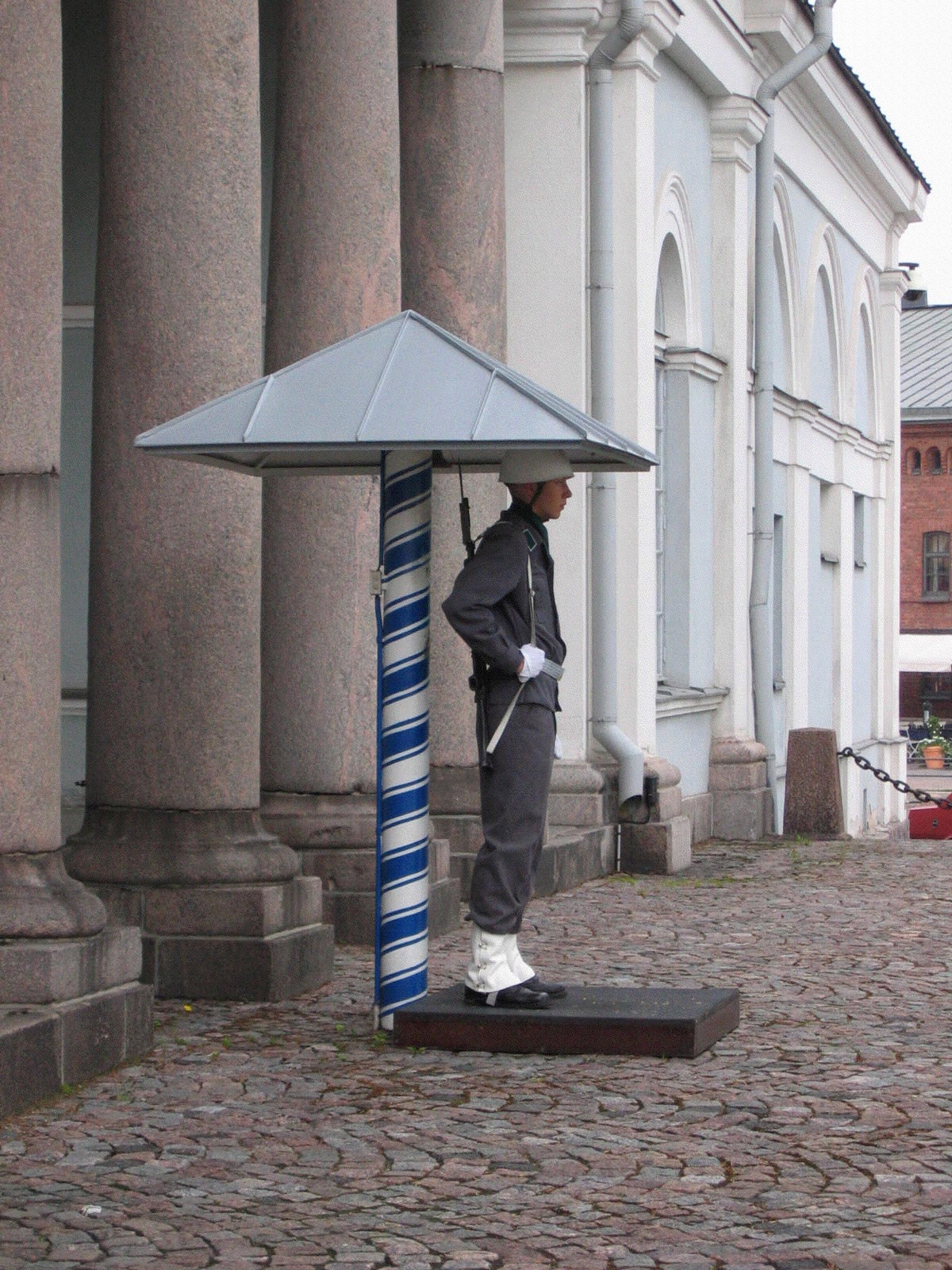
Finnish guard outside the Main Guard Post next to the President's Palace

After the new Constitution was passed in 1919 it was clear that the most suitable residence for the President was the former Imperial Palace. Complete repairs were made at speed, with the furnishings and art collections of the palace being returned from storage in the National Museum and the Ateneum art museum, and also being supplemented. Since then, it served as the official residence of the president. The palace was again refurbished and modernised by Martti Välikangas in 1938.

The Presidential Palace served as the official residence of all the presidents of Finland up to 1993, except for Presidents Risto Ryti, Gustaf Mannerheim, and Urho Kekkonen, who preferred to reside at Tamminiemi. The palace ceased to be used as the president's principal official residence during the presidency of Urho Kekkonen. He and his wife disliked the noise of nearby traffic and the lack of gardens, and soon moved to Tamminiemi, which remained Kekkonen's residence until his death. However, the palace again served as the principal residence of the president during the presidency of Mauno Koivisto, until the new residence, Mäntyniemi, was completed.

The palace contains private apartments and reception rooms for the president on its third floor, including the Yellow Room, the Red Waiting Room, and the President's Study. The palace also contains the Office of the President, which includes offices for the Secretary General, the Special Counsel to the President, and the Master of the Household. The palace's State rooms include the Hall of State, the Dining Hall, and the Hall of Mirrors (the small Hall of State). They are used by the president for official functions and receptions. These include the promotion and appointment ceremony for Defence Forces and Frontier Guard cadets, State Banquets, and the Independence Day reception.

The latest major renovations to the palace were done in 2012–2014 when the building services engineering was brought up to date for a cost of 45 million euros.

== Incidents ==
On 3 May 2024, a taxi crashed into a pillar located near one of the palace's guardhouses. The driver, who was believed to have suffered a medical seizure at the time of the incident, was hospitalised.

== Visitors ==
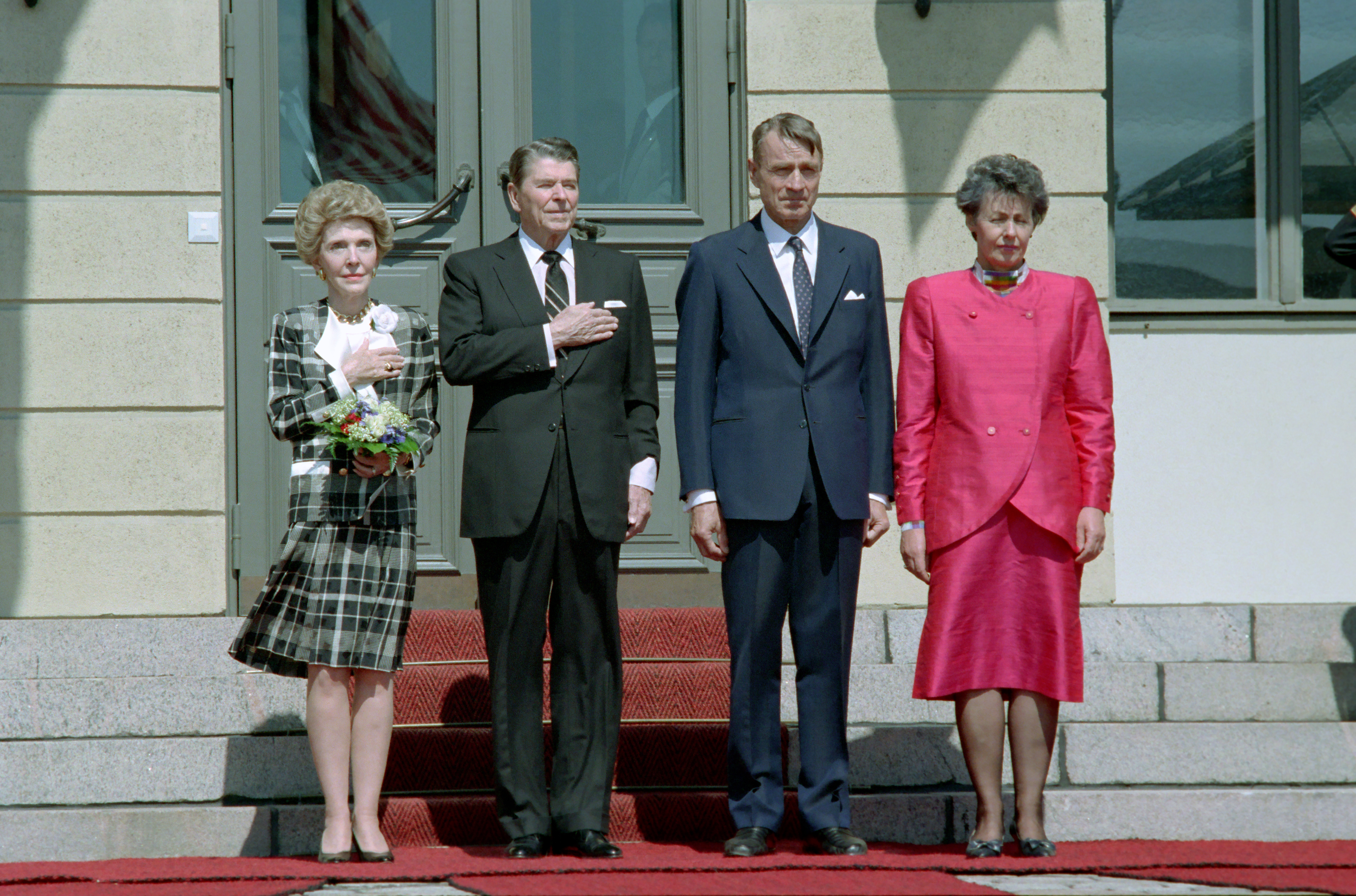
President Ronald Reagan and Nancy Reagan with Finnish President Mauno Koivisto and Tellervo Koivisto (May 1988)

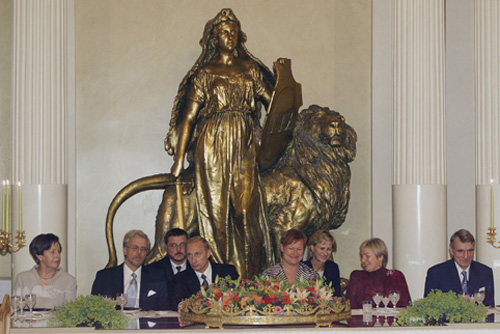
President Tarja Halonen meeting Russian president Vladimir Putin in 2001, with Walter Runeberg's Law behind them

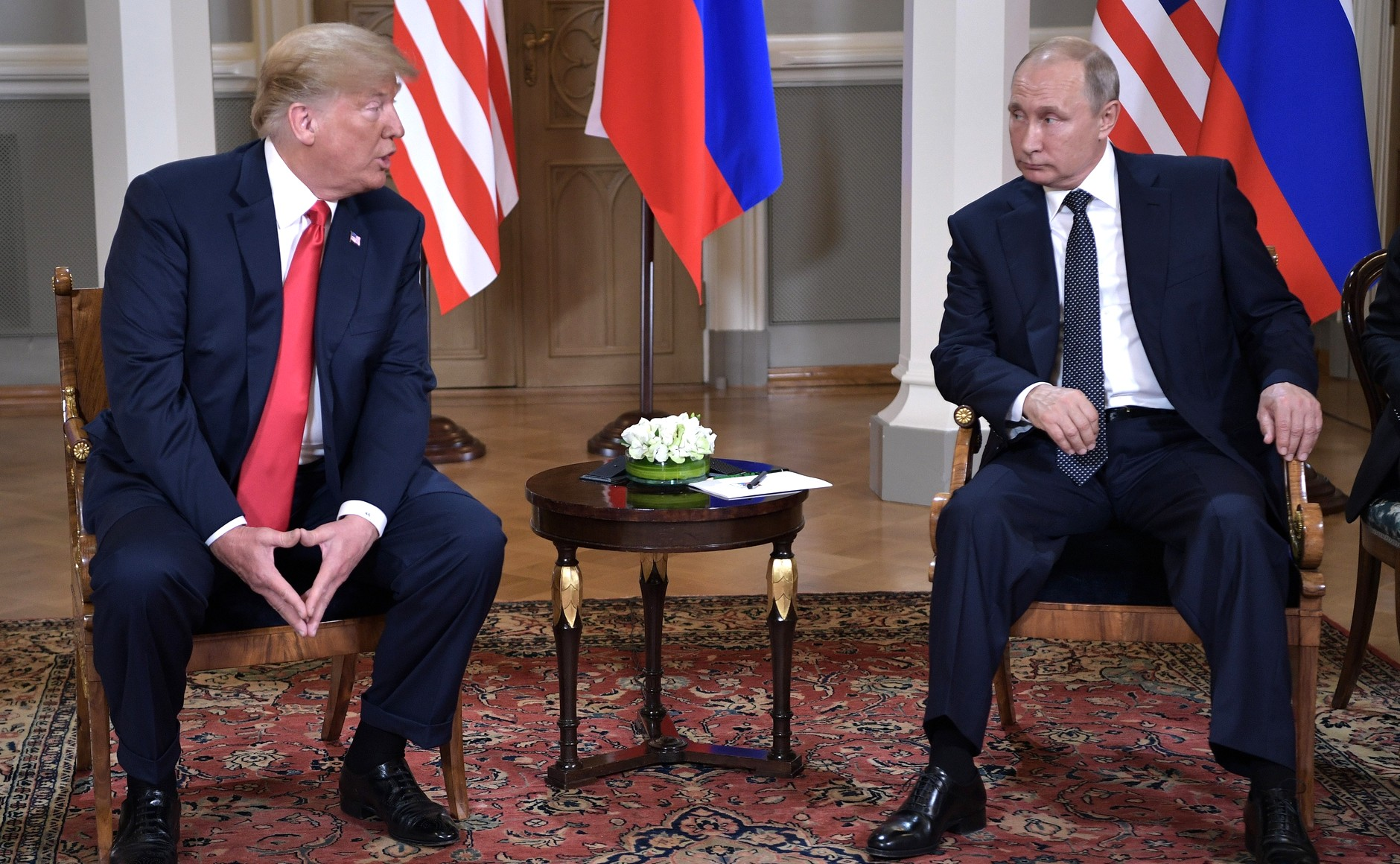
Donald Trump and Vladimir Putin, at the press center of the palace (16 July 2018)

In its role as the official residence of the president of Finland, the Presidential Palace has hosted a number of important foreign visitors and dignitaries. Royal visitors to the palace have included Carl XVI Gustaf of Sweden, Olav V of Norway, Elizabeth II of the United Kingdom, Juan Carlos I of Spain, Mohammad Reza Pahlavi of Iran, and Emperor Akihito of Japan. A number of US Presidents have visited the palace, including Gerald Ford, Ronald Reagan, and George H. W. Bush. Other distinguished visitors have included Pope John Paul II, Josip Broz Tito, Nikita Khrushchev, Boris Yeltsin, Horst Köhler, Xi Jinping, Shinzō Abe, and Vladimir Putin. On 16 July 2018 a summit between US President Donald Trump and Russian President Vladimir Putin was held at the Presidential Palace.

Visiting guests do not stay at the Presidential Palace nowadays, although they did in the past. Although the palace has nearly 3 000 square metres of floor space, and private apartments for the President and their family, much of the palace is occupied by offices and accommodation for the Office of the President, including the Secretary General, Presidential Cabinet, military Aides-de-Camp, and the household staff. Foreign guests can be housed at Mäntyniemi, the Königstedt Manor in Vantaa, or the Finnish State Guesthouse next to the Hilton Helsinki Kalastajatorppa Hotel in Munkkiniemi.

== Gallery ==
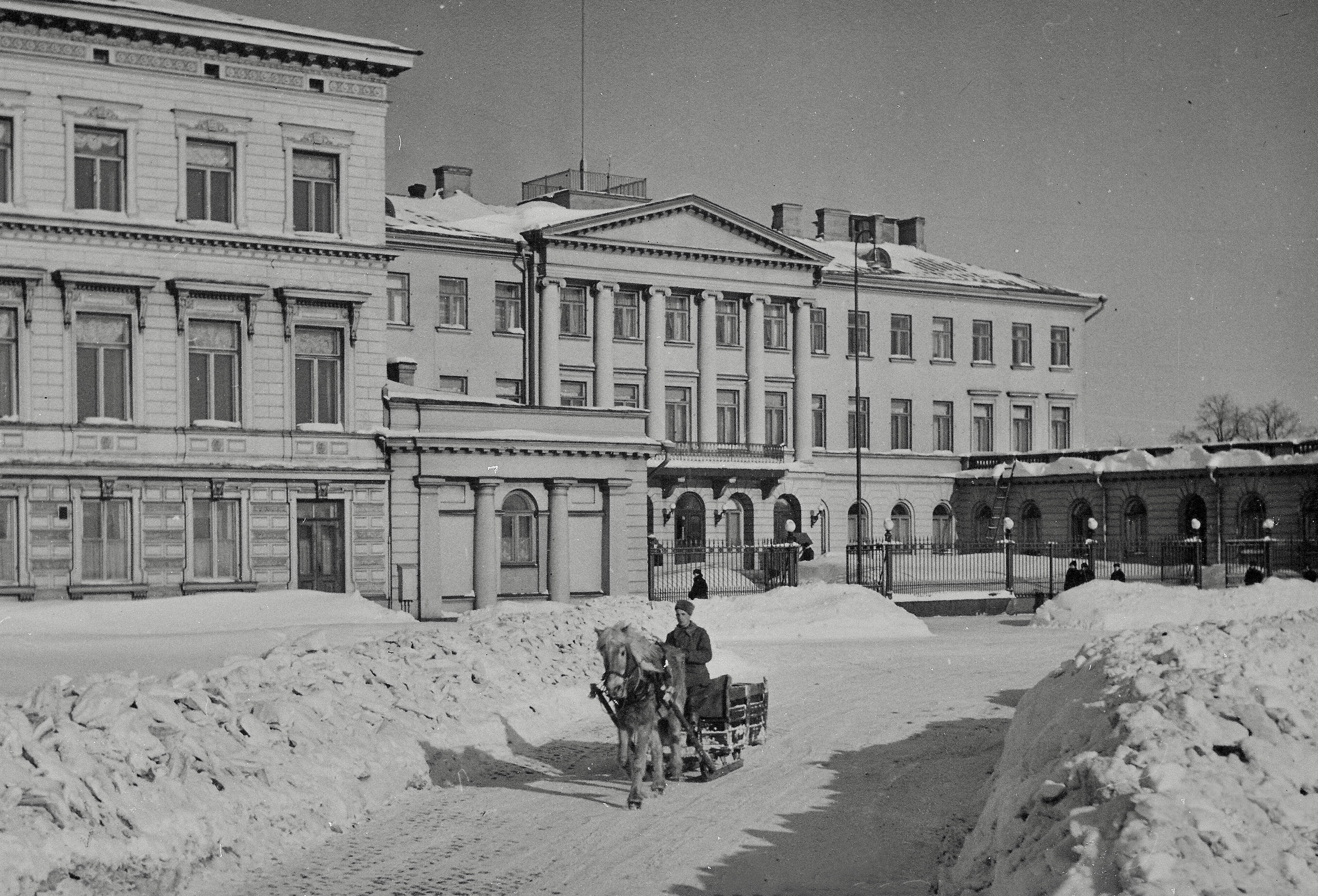
Presidential Palace in 1939

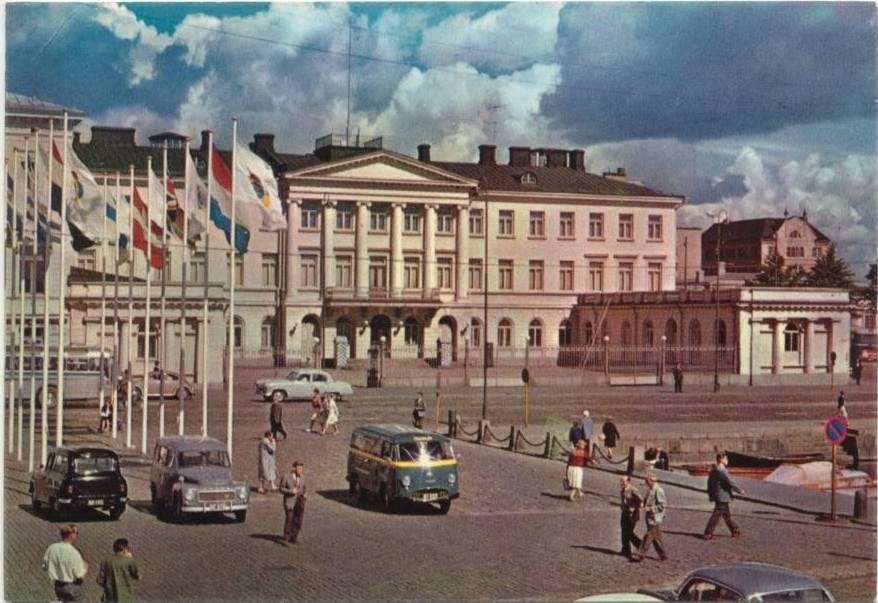
Presidential Palace in 1964

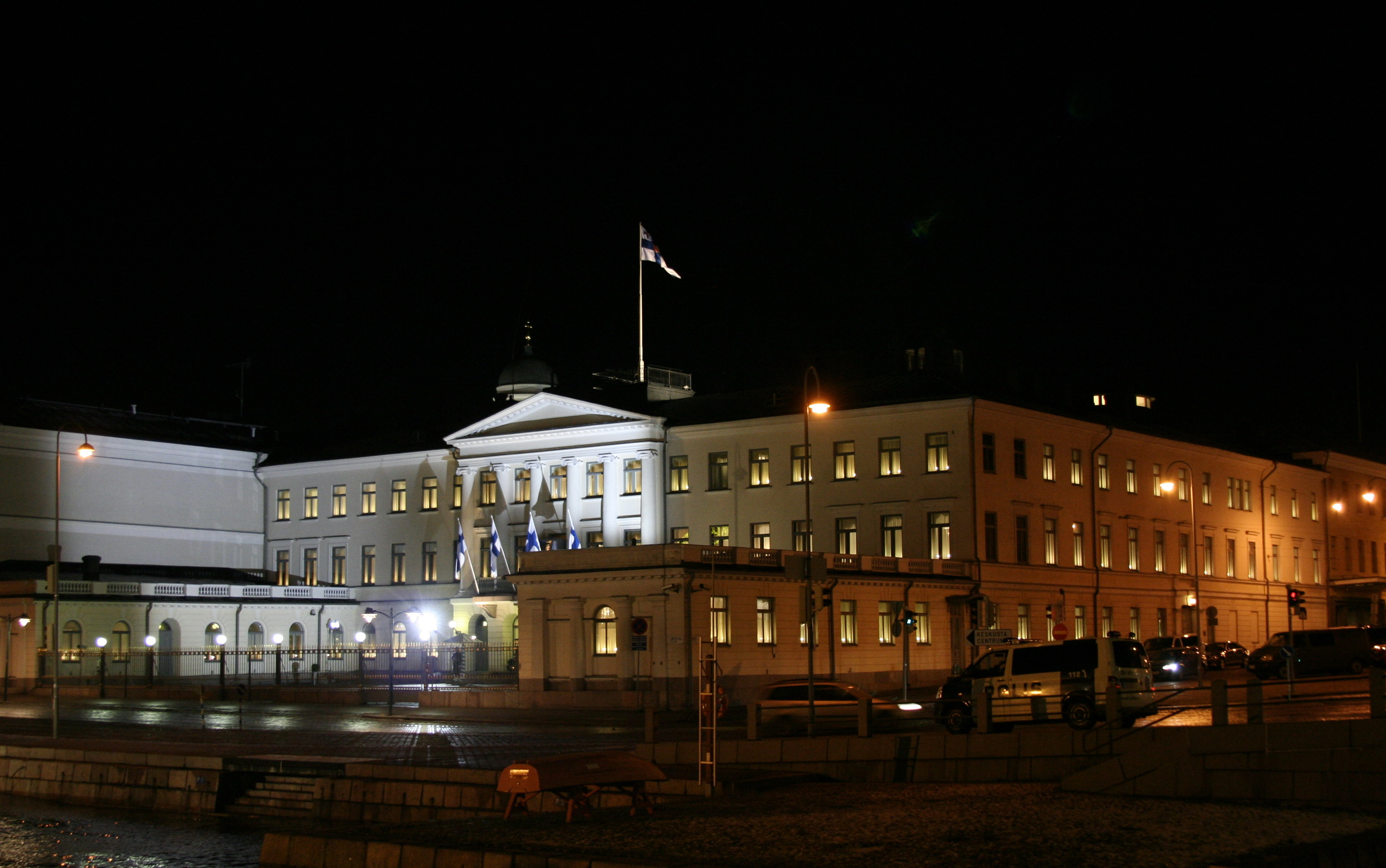
Presidential Palace in night time, Finland Independence Day in 2011

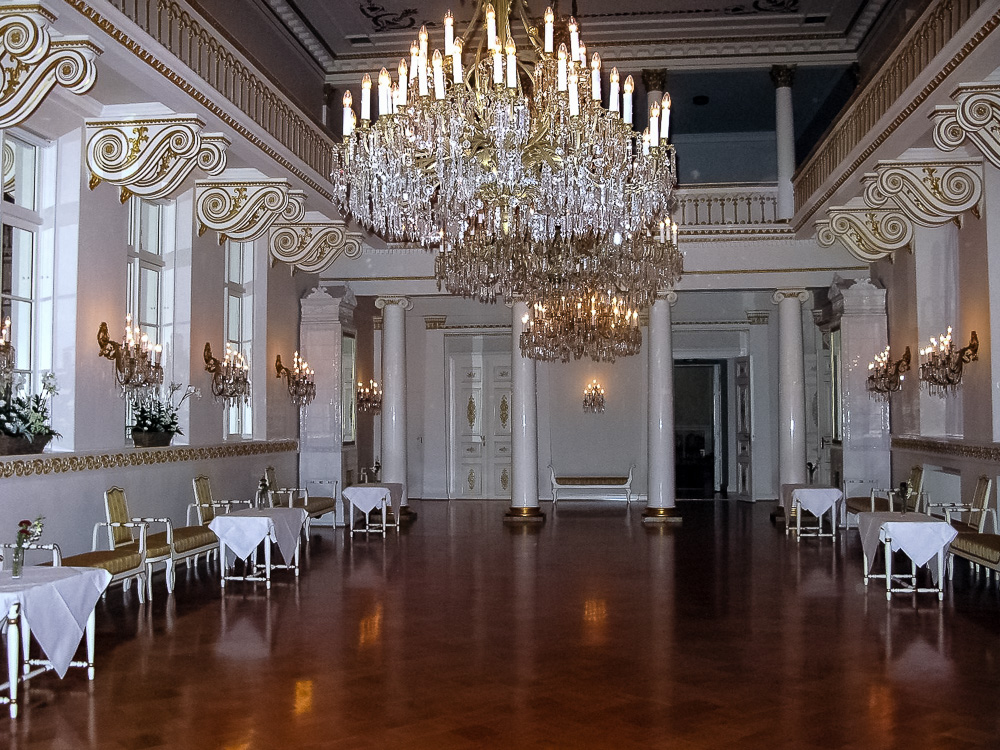
The interior of the palace.

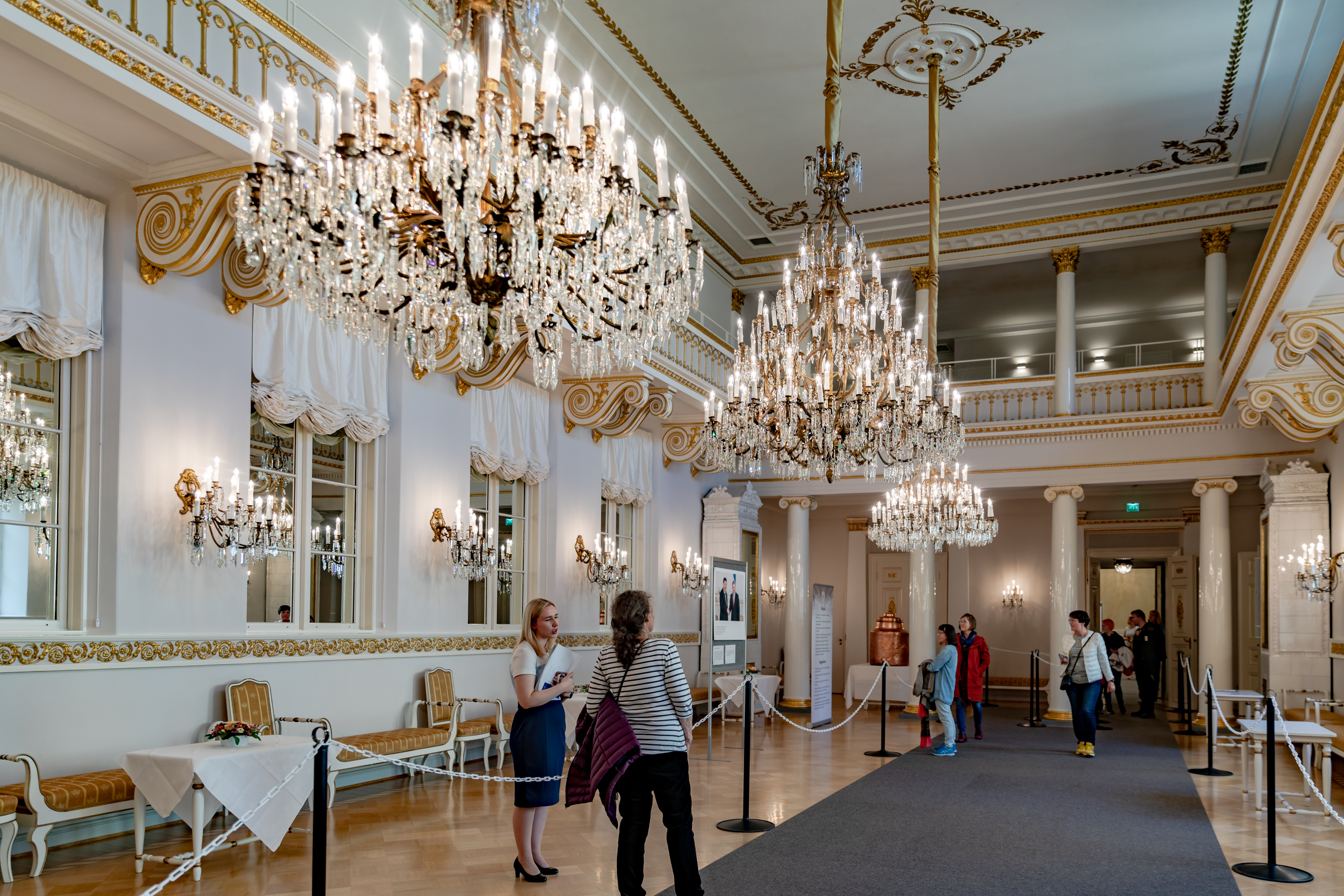
Visitors during an open house event in 2019

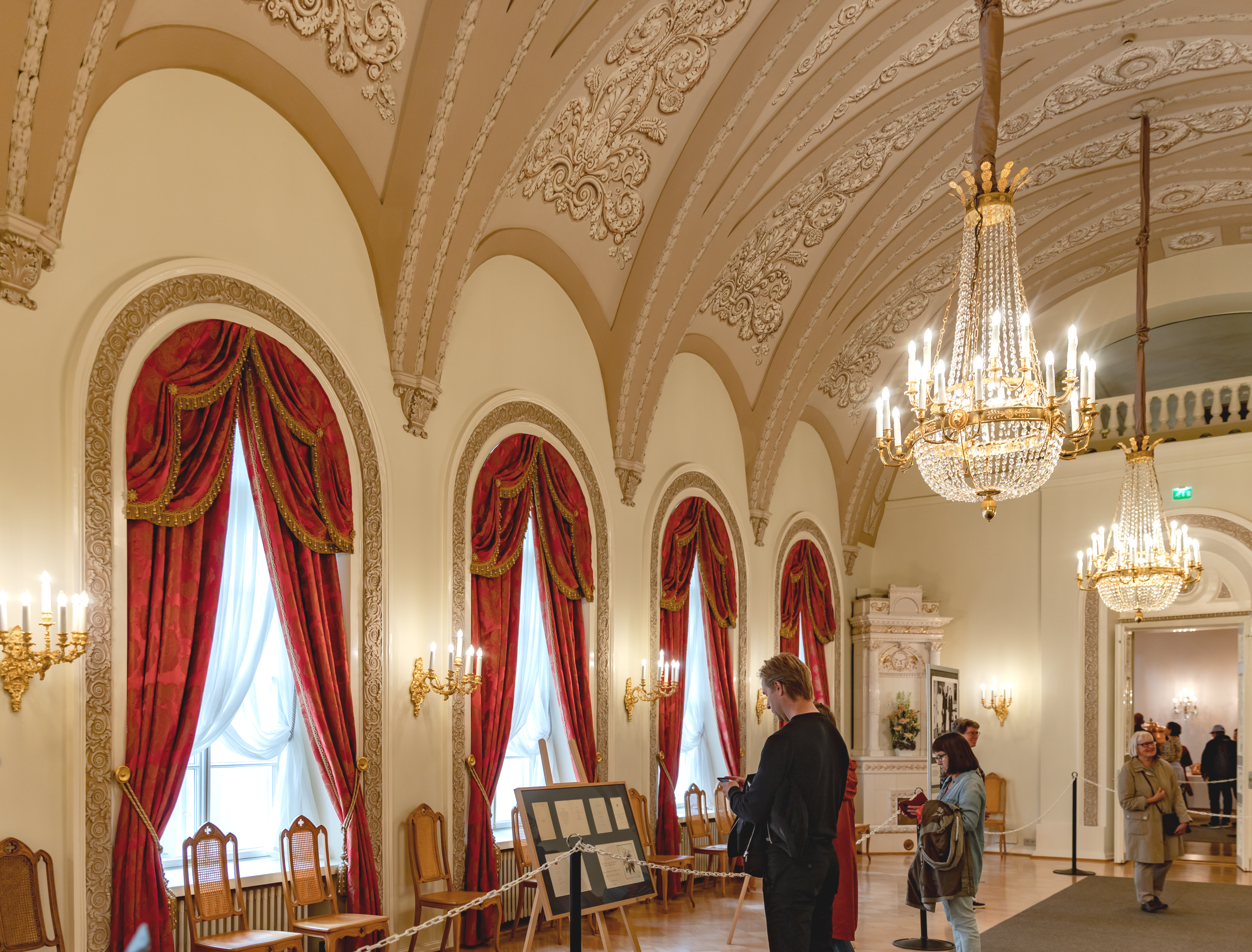
Open house event in 2019

== See also ==
- 2018 Russia–United States Summit
