= Roger Connah =

British academic

Roger Connah (born Chester England) is a writer, and independent scholar based in Ruthin, North Wales, and has taught for over three decades in Finland, India, Pakistan, Sweden, Canada, and the United States. He is currently professor of architecture at the Azrieli School of Architecture and Urbanism at Carleton University in Ottawa, Canada.

Connah studied architecture at Bristol University and Jesus College, Cambridge. In 1974, he moved to Helsinki, Finland, to study the work of architect Reima Pietilä, and worked in the office of Reima and Raili Pietilä until 1985. Connah has specialised in Finnish architecture and society, and has written numerous books on the subject, in particular on the life and works of architects Reima and Raili Pietilä and Alvar Aalto, as well as film director Aki Kaurismäki. Among his many publications is the book on Pietilä, Writing Architecture – Fantomas, Fragments, Fictions (An Architectural Journey through the Twentieth Century) (1989) which was awarded First Prize in the International Book Award in Architectural Theory and Criticism 1987–90 by CICA, the International Committee of Architectural Critics. Connah has also held and curated exhibitions, including 'KHAM' (Delhi, 1986) and 'Seven Famous Raincoats and a Moygashel' (1984). His films include 'Involuntary Architecture' (2005, with John Maruszczak).

In October 2008, Connah, together with John Maruszczak (and assisted by Ryan Manning), won first prize in the White House Redux competition; the competition invited people to design a new residence for the President of the USA. In the competition, the best ideas, designs, descriptions, images, and videos for a new White House were selected by some of the world's most distinguished designers and critics and, during October 2008, were on display at the Storefront for Art and Architecture, which, in association with Control Group, sponsored the contest. Connah and Maruszczak beat more than 500 other participants to win the competition. They stated that their submission was "an architectural folk-tale for the future, a hybrid representation using unusual poetics and a provocatively dislocated new media."

== Critical writings on the history of Finnish architecture ==
Over his career, Connah has specialised in the history of Finnish architecture, culminating in his critically acclaimed history of Finnish modernist architecture Finland – Modern Architectures in History (2005). However, Connah's position in regard to the history of Finnish architecture is seen as polemical because of his critical, questioning approach to what is regarded as the prevailing viewpoint among modernist Finnish architects that architecture is primarily determined by social not aesthetic issues – to the extent that during the 1960s and 1970s Finnish architects sought a non-aesthetic constructivist architecture: one such critic of Connah's position has been the academic Christer Bengs. However, others have been supportive of Connah's position, for instance the academic Eeva-Liisa Pelkonen calling Connah's book on Finland's most distinguished architect Alvar Aalto, Aaltomania (2000), "brilliant". Connah is also recognised as "one of the world's best authorities" on the architecture of architect Reima Pietilä.

== Published books ==
- Writing Architecture – Fantomas, Fragments, Fictions. An Architectural Journey through the Twentieth Century. MIT Press, Cambridge, Massachusetts, 1989.
- K/K. A Couple of Finns & Some Donald Ducks – Cinema in Society. PK, Helsinki 1991.
- The End of Finnish Architecture – Or CIAO Potemkin! The Building Institute, Helsinki, 1994.
- Tango Mäntyniemi. Edita, Helsinki 1994.
- Slogan – Aphorisms. Painatuskeskus, Helsinki, 1994.
- Welcome to the Hotel Architecture. MIT Press, Cambridge, Massachusetts, 1998.
- Centro Dipoli, Reima Pietilä. Universale di Architettura Torino, Testo & Imagine 42, Torino, 1998.
- Grace and Architecture. Building Information Ltd, Helsinki, 1998.
- Sa(l)vaged Modernism. Building Information Ltd, Helsinki, 2000.
- Aaltomania. Readings Against Aalto? Building Information Ltd, Helsinki, 2000.
- Zahoor Ul Akhlaq. The Enigma of Departure & Post-Mortem. Laal, Toronto, 2000.
- How Architecture got its Hump. MIT Press, Cambridge, Massachusetts, 2001
- 40/40 Young Finnish Architects. Building Information Ltd, Helsinki, 2002
- Finland – Modern Architectures in History. Reaktion Books, London, 2005.
- The Piglet Years: The Lost Militancy in Finnish Architecture. Datutop, Tampere, 2007.
- Ian Ritchie (RA) Being: an Architect. Royal Academy, London 2013.
- The School of Exile: Timo Penttilä for and against architecture theory. Datutop, Tampere, 2015.
