= Dipoli =

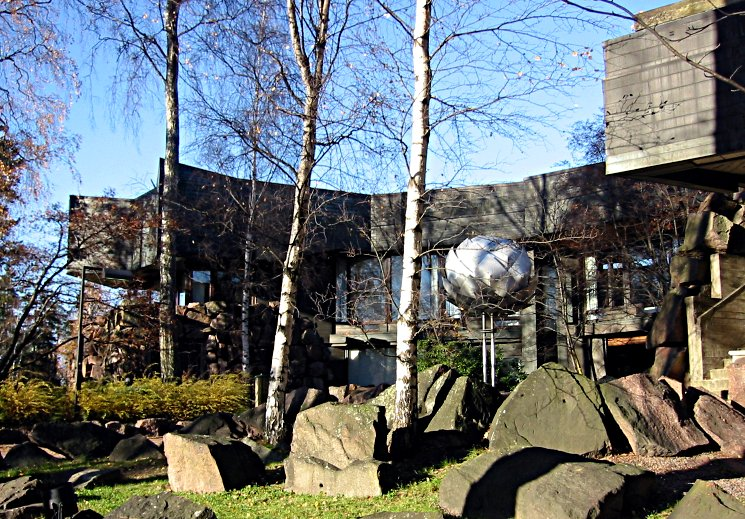
- Interactive map of the Dipoli area

General information
- Type: University building
- Architectural style: Expressionist Modern
- Location: Espoo, Finland
- Coordinates: 60°11′6″N 24°49′57″E
- Construction started: 1961
- Completed: 1966
- Renovated: 2015–2017

Design and construction
- Architects: Reima Pietilä and Raili Pietilä

Dipoli is a building located in the Aalto University's Otaniemi campus in Espoo in Otakaari 24, Finland. It was designed by architects Reima and Raili Pietilä and opened in 1966. Dipoli was initially owned by the Student Union of the Helsinki University of Technology who sold it to Aalto University in 2014.

== Name ==
The name of the building is a pun: it can mean dipole in Finnish, but also "the second Poly", the second building of the polytechnic students. The original Polytechnic Students' Union, now called the "Old Poly" (Finnish: Vanha Poli), was a National Romantic building located on Lönnrotinkatu in Helsinki that was left behind when the university moved to Otaniemi.

== History ==
Helsinki University of Technology moved from Helsinki to Espoo in the early 1960s, with the first buildings to be constructed designed by architect Alvar Aalto. In 1961 an architecture competition was held to decide what would become the new building for the Student Union of the university. Due to the challenging rocky location and adaptability requirements none of the competition entries fulfilled all the jury's demands and the first prize was not awarded: the second prize was shared by the architect couple Reima and Raili Pietilä and Osmo Lappo, who were asked to further develop their proposals. Finally, the design by the Pietiläs was chosen as the basis for the new building. Construction work began in 1965, and the building was ready for use in autumn 1966.

In 1993 the building was transformed into a training centre for the university due to high maintenance costs. Besides its primary role, Dipoli is still regularly used for conventions, congresses, and student parties. The building houses over 20 conference rooms and auditoriums.

Dipoli was owned by the student union of Aalto University until 2013 when it was announced that the building would be sold to the university itself for an undisclosed sum. The building was extensively renovated between 2015 and 2017, turning it into the new main building for the university. The refurbished building includes an auditorium, restaurants, and exhibitions spaces.

== Architecture ==
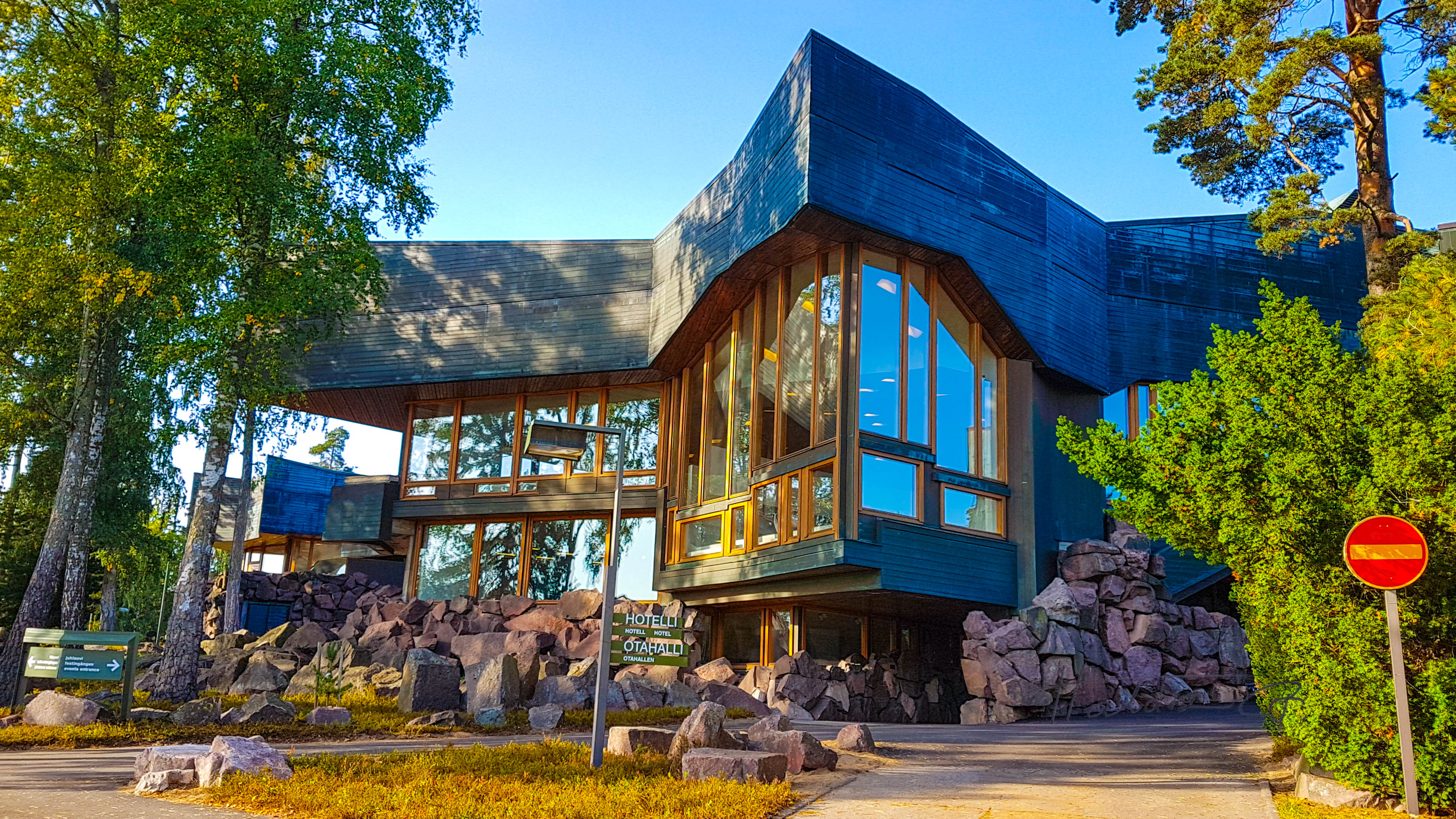
Dipoli's organic architecture is characterised by its many corners and windows which are unequal in size

The building uses extensively materials from Finnish nature, such as pine wood, copper, and natural rocks. Dipoli has 500 windows, of which only four are identical. The architects originally planned for as little interference with the natural granite of the site as possible, but blasting the hard granite base rock inevitably fragmented it. The building is seen as a key example of organic architecture. Reima Pietilä himself said of the building:

"As in Samuel Beckett's novels, there are no exposed trenchmarks of balance. The concept of a traditional balance of composition is redundant in the design aesthetics of Dipoli. (...) after the hill top was blasted the broken heaps of rock gave an initial image which one could follow with the slow, crawling motion of structure. The reptilian metaphoric image: the silhouetted dinosaur accentuating the rhythmic consistency of retardation."
