= Mäntyniemi =

Official residence in Helsinki, Finland

- Interactive map of the Mäntyniemi area

General information
- Type: Official residence
- Location: Helsinki, Finland
- Coordinates: 60.18473°N 24.89724°E
- Current tenants: President of Finland
- Construction started: 1989
- Completed: 1993; 33 years ago
- Owner: Government of Finland

Design and construction
- Architects: Reima Pietilä and Raili Pietilä

Mäntyniemi (Swedish: Talludden; lit. 'Pine Cape') is one of the three official residences of the President of Finland, besides the Presidential Palace and the summer residence Kultaranta. Mäntyniemi was finished in 1993. Four Finnish presidents have lived there: Mauno Koivisto, Martti Ahtisaari, Tarja Halonen and Sauli Niinistö.

== History ==
When president Urho Kekkonen resigned in 1982 due to a serious illness, he stayed in the then official residence Tamminiemi until his death in 1986. The Government of Finland set aside Tamminiemi for him and decided to choose a new residence for the president Koivisto. In 1983, 28,000 m^{2} (300,000 ft^{2}) of land was bought in the Meilahti district in western Helsinki. Architects Reima and Raili Pietilä, well known for their distinctive organic architecture, won the open architectural competition to design Mäntyniemi. Construction started in September 1989 and was completed in 1993.

== Features ==
Mäntyniemi is the first official residence to be built specifically for the President of Finland. It is located by the sea. Steps lead down from the main reception room to a waterfront terrace.

There are three buildings on the site. The large main house comprises most of the total floor space of approximately 2,000 m^{2} (22,000 ft^{2}). The main house contains the president's private living quarters and personal office suites, as well as the reception rooms. The latter can be used for meetings, for receiving visitors, and for hosting smaller receptions. There is also a small gatehouse and an outbuilding on the premises.

Interior design, the textiles, furnishings, tableware and other items were designed specifically for Mäntyniemi. Competitions for artists were held to choose some of the individual works of art for particular settings or parts of the house. Stone (such as granite) and wood (birch) are among the commonly used materials on the inside, along with concrete.

The surrounding landscaping was designed by Maj-Lis Rosenbröjer to exist in harmony with the natural vegetation.

== Numerical data ==
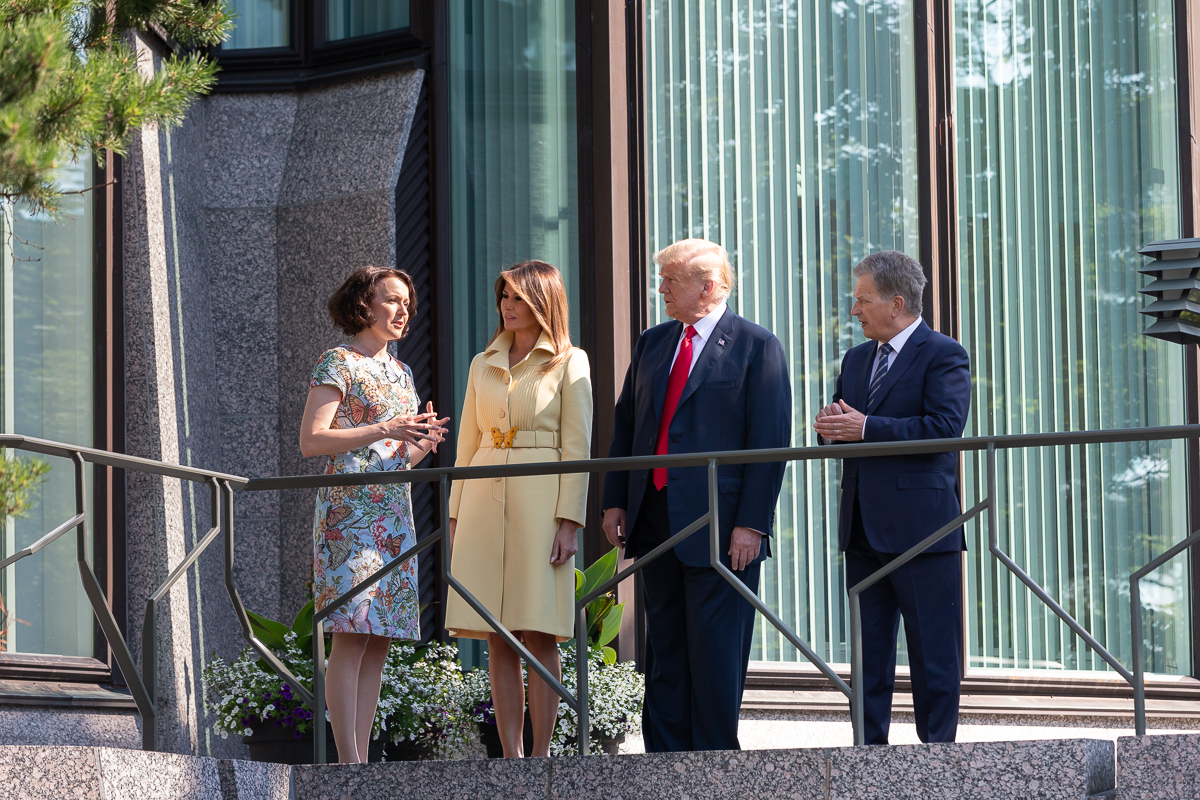
President Donald Trump and First Lady Melania Trump with President Sauli Niinistö and Jenni Haukio at the Mäntyniemi Residence in 2018

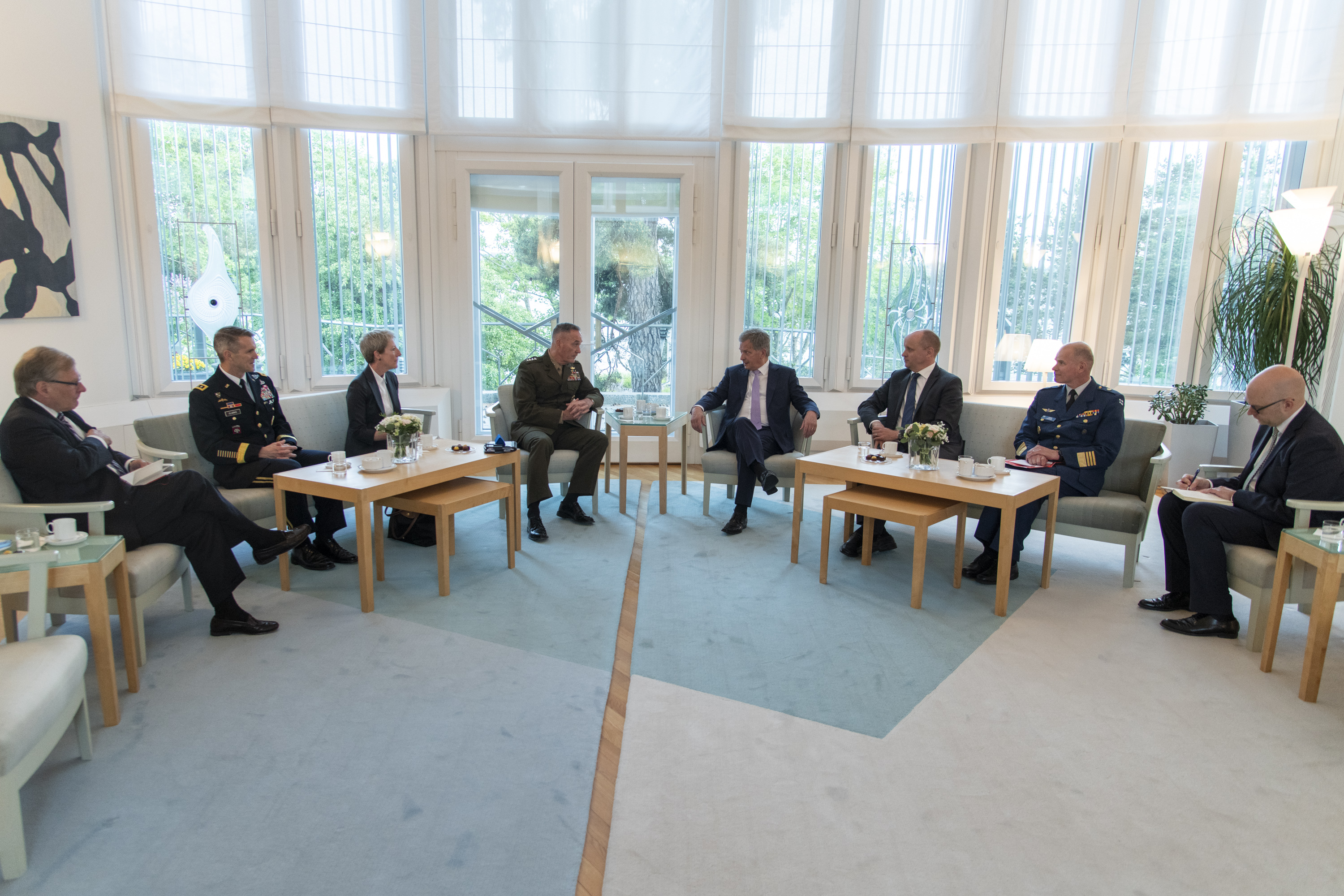
President Sauli Niinistö hosts Marine Corps Gen. Joe Dunford, chairman of the Joint Chiefs of Staff, for an office call at the Mäntyniemi

- Volume: 16,290 m^{3} (575,000 ft^{3})
- Gross floor space: 4,210 m^{2} (45,300 ft^{2})
- Net floor space: 2,312 m^{2} (24,890 ft^{2}), of which:
  - Private living quarters: 680 m^{2} (7,300 ft^{2})
  - Personal offices: 424 m^{2} (4,560 ft^{2})
  - Reception rooms: 916 m^{2} (9,860 ft^{2})
- Windows: 300
- Corners on the exterior: 212
- Doors: 190, of which 180 are all different

In comparison, the White House has 5,100 m^{2} (55,000 ft^{2}) of floor space.

== Presidents who have resided in Mäntyniemi ==
- Mauno Koivisto (1993–1994)
- Martti Ahtisaari (1994–2000)
- Tarja Halonen (2000–2012)
- Sauli Niinistö (2012–2024)
- Alexander Stubb (2024-); for the first two years of his presidency, until May 2026, Stubb resided in the Finnish State Guesthouse, while Mäntyniemi underwent extensive renovations.

== See also ==
- Finnish State Guesthouse
