= National Police Board of Finland =

Policing body in Finland

- Poliisihallitus

Agency overview
- Formed: 2010
- Jurisdiction: Finland
- Headquarters: Vuorimiehentie 3, Espoo, Finland
- Employees: 10559 (2023)
- Annual budget: €883 m EUR (2023)
- Minister responsible: Ministry of the Interior
- Agency executive: Seppo Kolehmainen
- Website: Official website

The National Police Board of Finland (Finnish: Poliisihallitus) is the central agency under the Ministry of the Interior of Finland responsible for planning, leading, developing, and supervising police operations in Finland and its support functions. It also ensures equitable access to police services across the country, decides on cooperation between police units, and oversees the performance management of police units. The National Police Board began its operations at the beginning of 2010. Its organization is two-tiered: the National Police Board leads and directs operational police activities. Directly under the National Police Board are the police departments and the national police units, including the National Bureau of Investigation and the Police University College of Finland. The Finnish Security Intelligence Service is directly under the Ministry of the Interior.

== Organization ==
The head of the National Police Board is the Chief of Police. The tasks of the National Police Board are divided into seven units, which are the headquarters, police operations unit, administration unit, technology unit, and internal audit. In addition, outside the unit structure, the National Police Board includes Gambling Administration directly under the Chief of Police.

The central unit of the National Police Board is located in Pasila, Helsinki, and parts in Joensuu. Gambling Administration and firearms administration are located in Riihimäki, and the security supervision unit is in Mikkeli. The Police University College is located in Tampere, and its subordinate police dog department is in Hämeenlinna.
