= Hervantajärvi =

Lake or pond in Tampere, Finland

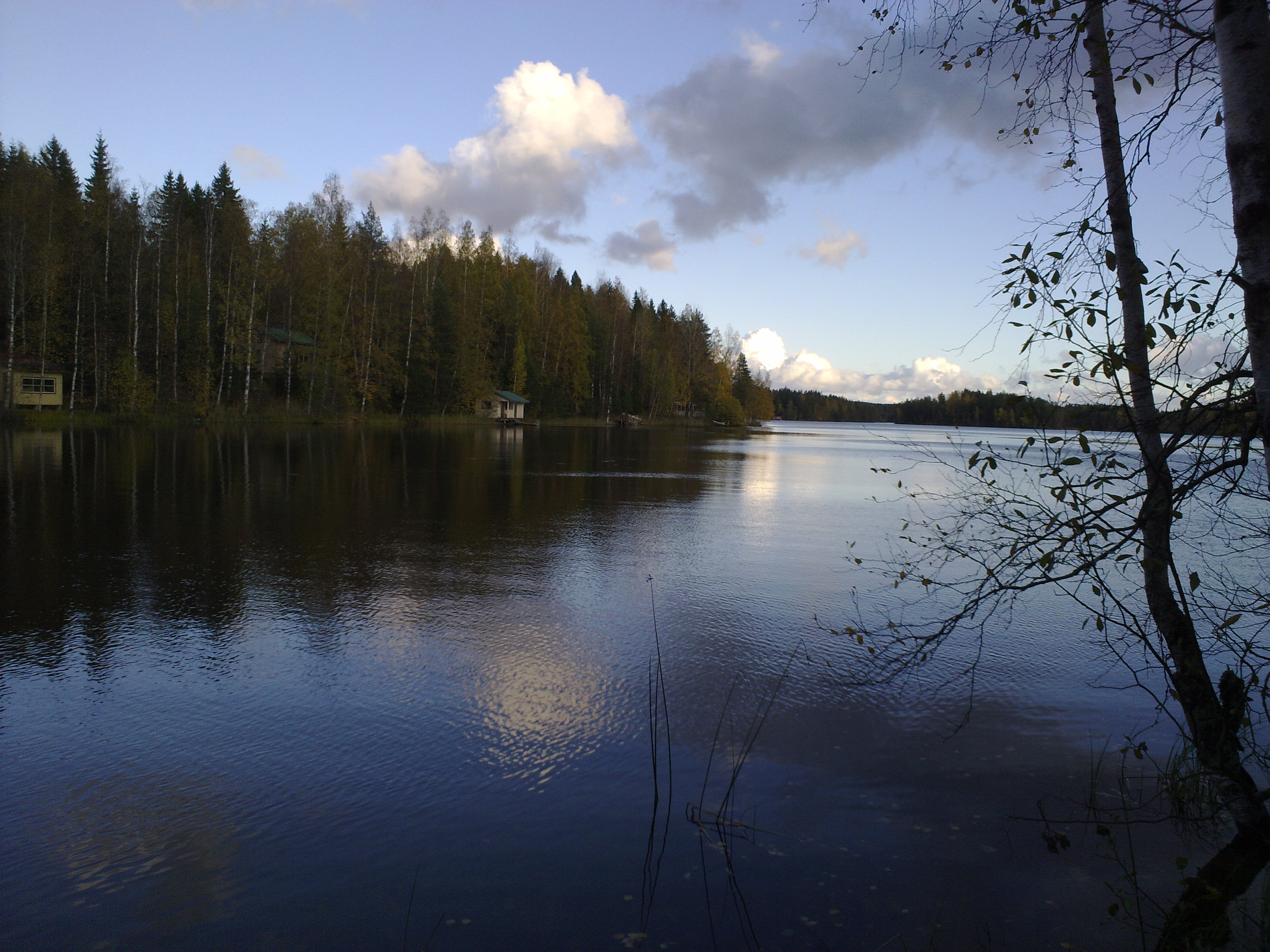
- Hervantajärvi in October 2009

- Location within Finland
- Location: Hervantajärvi, Tampere; Sääksjärvi, Lempäälä
- Coordinates: 61°25′52″N 23°51′22″E
- Basin countries: Finland
- Surface area: 0.8 km^{2} (0.31 sq mi)
- Max. depth: 20 m (66 ft)
- Surface elevation: 114.9 m (377 ft)

Hervantajärvi is a lake in Pirkanmaa, Finland, located in the between of Tampere's Hervantajärvi district and Lempäälä's Sääksjärvi district, which belongs to the Moisionjoki catchment area of the Vanajavesi–Pyhäjärvi area in the Kokemäki River watershed. Lake Hervantajärvi is part of the catchment area of Lake Höytämönjärvi.

Hervantajärvi belongs to the small and medium-sized low-humic lakes. Its water is clear, but runoff from the marshes on the east and south sides of the lake brings humus to the lake. In the 1980s, Hervantajärvi was considered a lake at risk of acidification. Then the acidity of the water regularly went below six. Today, as the acid load has decreased, the acidity value of the water has remained consistently above 6,4 and the buffering capacity of the water has increased to avoid. The water quality of Hervantajärvi is between good and satisfactory class. The lake is still sensitive to acidification, and especially in winter the accompanying load of runoff consumes the lake's oxygen resources. Algae blooms are also occasionally found on the lake.

On the 1953 basic map, there were two small farms on the south shore of the lake. A road led to them from Messukylä in the north. Already at that time, more than 20 holiday homes had been marked on the beaches. On the map of 1975, the cottage village of Majaranta was marked on the north-western basin. Other cottages also appeared on the shores of the lake. The road to the lake improved considerably when construction began on Hervanta.
