= Hervantajärvi (district) =

City district in Tampere, Finland

Coordinates: 61°25′54″N 23°51′17″E

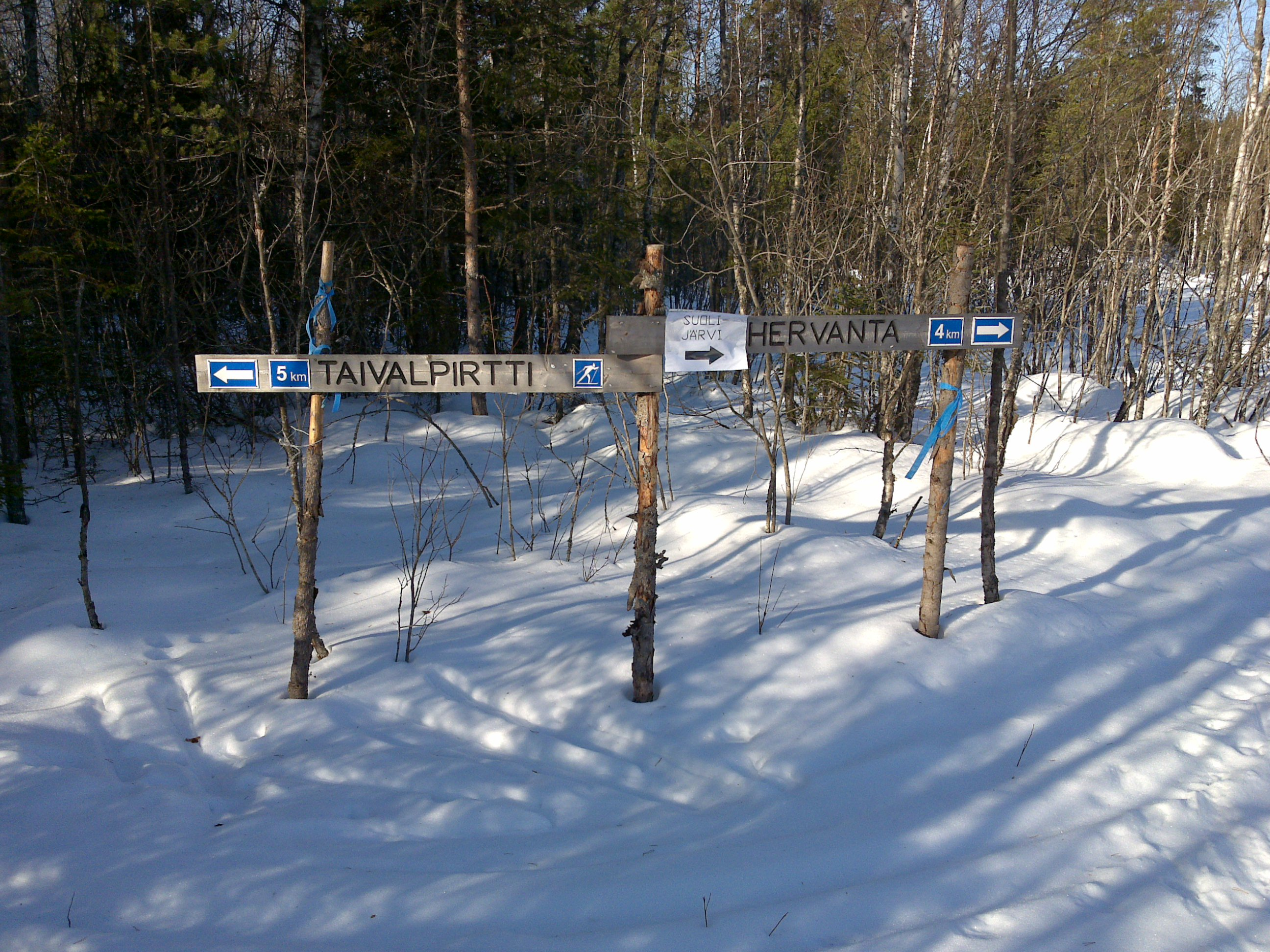
A ski trail leading to Taivalpirtti in Hervantajärvi

Hervantajärvi is the southernmost district of the Tampere city in Pirkanmaa, Finland, located about eight kilometers southeast of the city center. It is bordered on the west by Vuores and on the north by Ruskontie, on the north by Hervanta and Rusko. In the east the border is between Kangasala and in the south against Lempäälä. The district is named after Lake Hervanta in the area, which is partly on the Lempäälä side.

The area has been developed with multi-storey and detached houses for about 3,000 inhabitants in 2020s. The area developed has been limited by the presence of the vulnerable Siberian flying squirrel in the area.

Hervantajärvi is served by the terminus of the Tampere light rail.
