= Hervanta =

District in Tampere, Finland

Coordinates: 61.4481°N 23.8521°E

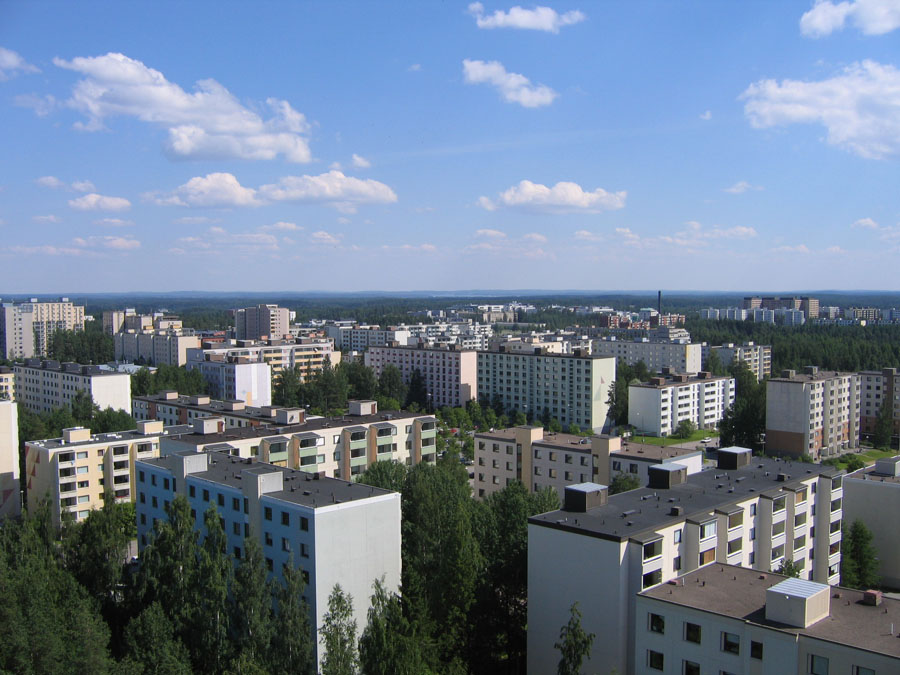
Residential tower blocks in Hervanta

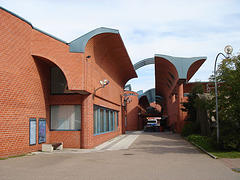
Community center complex by Reima Pietilä

Hervanta is a large suburb of Tampere in Finland, located next to Hallila and Vuores, some 10 km south of the city centre.

Hervanta currently covers an area of 13.8 km² and is continuing to grow. Home to a population of over 26,000, Hervanta is best known for its prefabricated blocks of flats. The total number of apartments is about 11,000. Nearly a fifth of the inhabitants (some 4,500 people) are students, many of them enrolled at the Tampere University, TUNI (TUNI was created by joining former Tampere University of Technology, TUT, with University of Tampere, UTA, and it also includes Tampere University of Applied Sciences, TAMK), or the Police University College. The largest student housing complex is Mikontalo, in fact nearly 3% of people in Hervanta reside there. Approximately 10% of Hervanta's population is composed of foreigners from 75 different nationalities.

Hervanta was known as a notorious neighborhood for a long time, but its reputation has improved considerably over time. It was selected as Finland's top suburb in a survey conducted by the Helsingin Sanomat newspaper and published on 17 August 2003. The Finnish Local Heritage Federation chose Hervanta as the District of the Year in 2026.

The complex of commercial buildings in the town center of Hervanta was designed by the Finnish architect Reima Pietilä.

== Technology ==
Hervanta is sometimes called the Silicon Valley of Finland due to the high concentration of high tech companies in the area and the presence of the Tampere University of Technology. As well as the University, Hervanta is also home to the Hermia science centre and the VTT office complex. The world's first-ever GSM phone call was made in Hervanta in 1991, when Radiolinja started building its GSM network. Nokia, Huawei, Intel, Microsoft, and many other companies have offices in Hervanta.

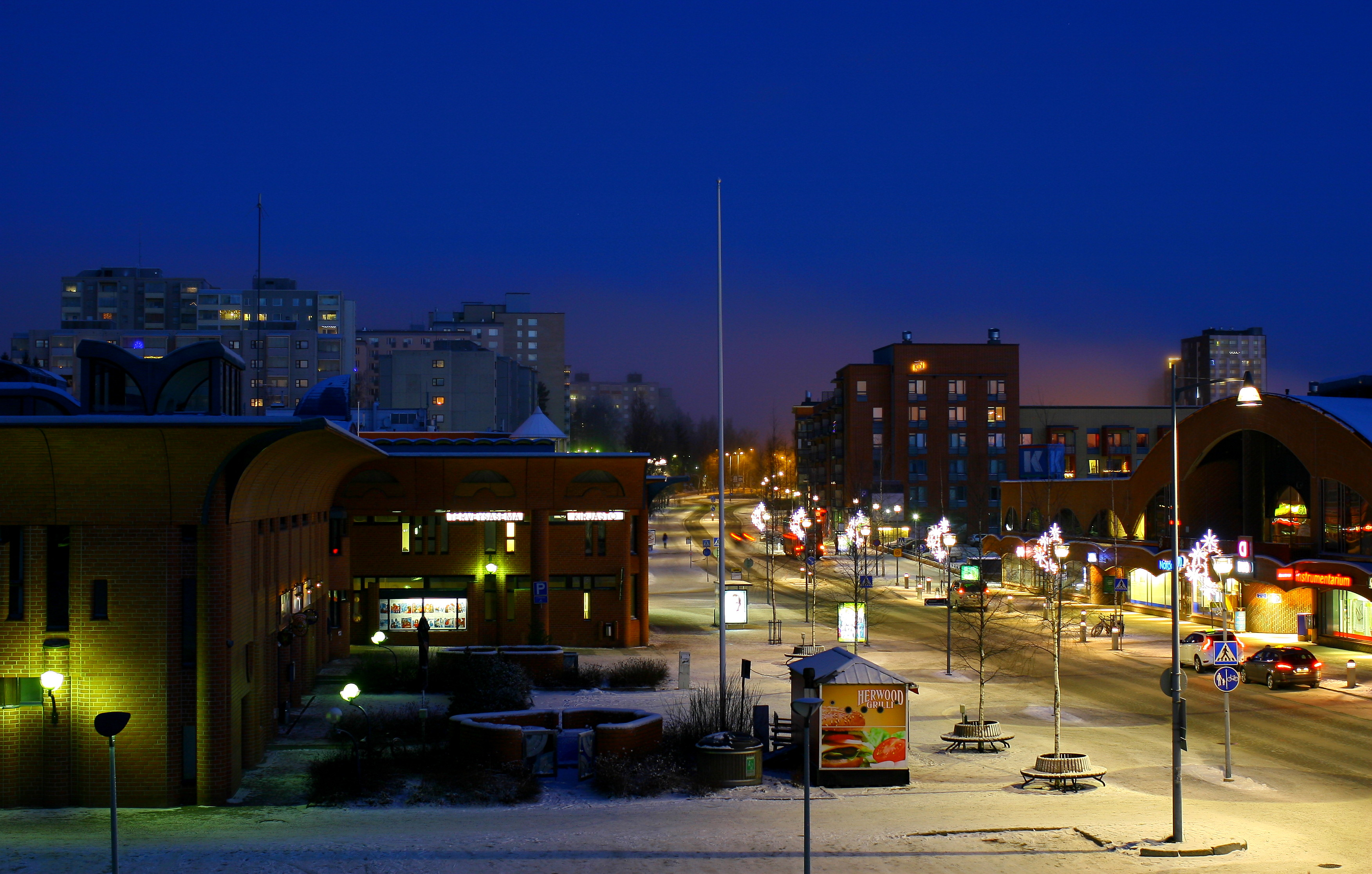
Hervanta center at night. The community center complex can be seen on the left.

== Recreation ==
On the north edge of Hervanta at Lukonmäki is a downhill skiing centre with two skiing runs and one lift. The ski centre also includes a small ski jump tower that is clearly visible when entering Hervanta from the north along Hervannan valtaväylä road.

On the west side of Hervanta is located lake Suolijärvi that has a small beach for sunbathing and swimming. Around the lake are two trails; The innermost and smaller trail goes around the lake near the shore while the outermost one makes a longer route keeping a fair distance from the lake. The longer route is linked to the trail network stretching around Tampere. The trails are used for jogging and cross-country skiing (during winter).

Hervanta has numerous small sport fields that are generally used for soccer and Finnish baseball. During winter, some of the fields are frozen for ice-skating and ice hockey.

Ahvenispuisto around lake Ahvenisjärvi could be considered as Hervanta's central park. In the southern part of Hervanta there is another large park called Näyttelijänpuisto. Näyttelijänpuisto has a disc golf track and a noteworthy hill that is used for tobogganing in winter. Hervanta has numerous smaller parks in addition to these.

Hervanta has a few barbecue stalls serving popular kebab food, including Hervannan Grilli.

== See also ==
- Duo (shopping mall)
- Hervantajärvi (district)
- Lake Hervanta
