= Suolijärvi =

Lake of Tampere, Finland

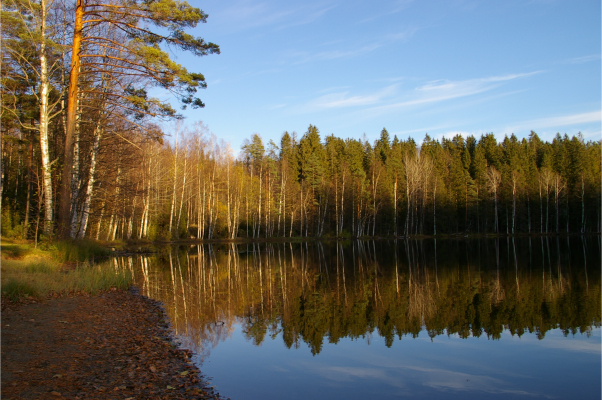

- Location within Finland
- Interactive map of Suolijärvi
- Location: Tampere
- Coordinates: 61°26′28″N 023°49′42″E
- Primary inflows: Suolioja
- Basin countries: Finland
- Surface elevation: 114.9 m (377 ft)

Suolijärvi is a small lake in Tampere, Finland. It is situated west of the suburb Hervanta. It has a small beach where people can sunbathe or swim during the summer. There are also two trails which bound the lake.

The name derives from Finnish suoli (intestine) and järvi (lake). This is probably due to the curved shape of the lake.

Suolijärvi is also a village near Puolanka in the Northern Finland east of Oulu.
