= Finnish State Guesthouse =

Building in Helsinki, Finland

- Valtion vierastalo / Statens gästhus
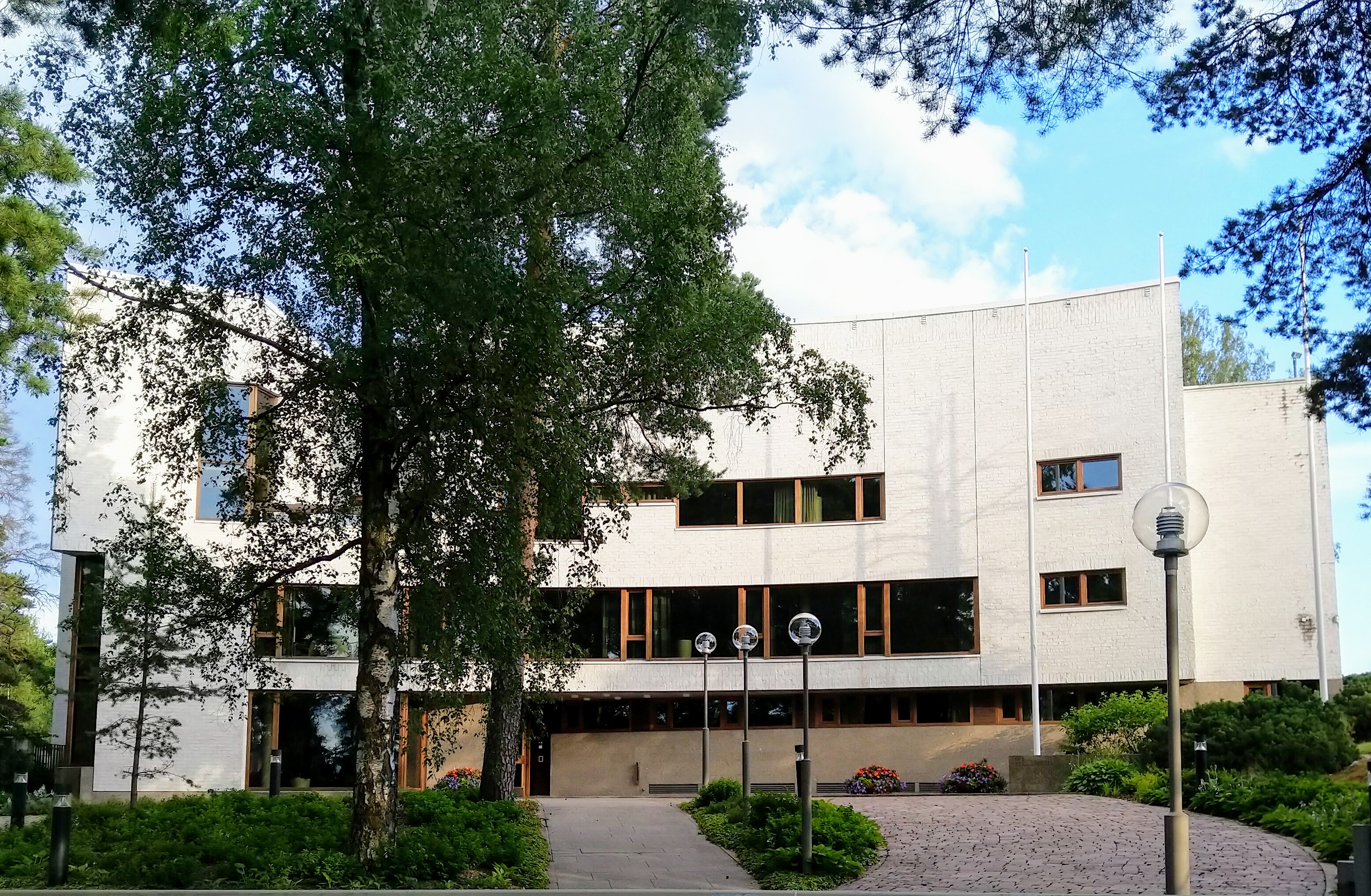
- Interactive map of the Finnish State Guesthouse area

General information
- Coordinates: 60.1928°N 24.8745°E
- Completed: 1984
- Renovated: 2001, 2024
- Cost: EUR 3.5m
- Renovation cost: EUR 19m (2024)
- Owner: Finnish Government

Technical details
- Material: Masonry
- Floor count: 3
- Floor area: 2,525 square metres (27,180 sq ft)

Design and construction
- Architect: Einari Teräsvirta
- Developer: Polar-Yhtymä

The Finnish State Guesthouse (Finnish: Valtion vierastalo, Swedish: Statens gästhus) is the official visitor accommodation of the Finnish Government, located in the Munkkiniemi district of Helsinki.

== Background and use ==
In the 1970s, the need arose for a better and more modern facility to accommodate official visitors. A building plot was earmarked for this purpose, carved out of parkland in Munkkiniemi, adjacent to the Hotel Kalastajatorppa to which it is connected by a tunnel; the rationale being that catering, housekeeping, and similar services could be provided by the hotel as part of their normal operations, thus negating the need for the guesthouse to employ its own permanent staff.

The building was designed by architect Einari Teräsvirta, who had also designed Kalastajatorppa, and completed in 1984. The budgeted cost was c. FIM 22m, or over EUR 3.5m in today's money.

The Guesthouse is reserved for use by foreign heads of state during state visits, and for other official visits by heads of government and other high-level visiting dignitaries. The facility's use is determined by the Government (Valtioneuvosto).

In a typical year, the Guesthouse is used approximately ten times. Guests have included Prince Philip, Harald V, George H. W. Bush, Boris Yeltsin, Hillary Clinton, Donald Trump, Joe Biden, Xi Jinping and Ban Ki Moon, among others.

=== As temporary presidential accommodation ===
Following his March 2024 inauguration as the President of Finland, Alexander Stubb and his family were accommodated in the State Guesthouse, as the President's official residence Mäntyniemi, nearby some 1 kilometre (0.6 mi) away, was about to undergo an extensive renovation lasting several years.

Previously, the Guesthouse also briefly accommodated President Mauno Koivisto in 1986.

== Architecture ==
Teräsvirta designed the building to blend into its pinewood and rocky outcrop surroundings. Its exterior cladding features red-brown granite, light sandstone, and wood. Parts of the building have sea views over the nearby Laajalahti inlet.

The building's floor area is 2,525 square metres (27,180 sq ft) (gross), laid out over three stories connected by a lift. In addition to living and dining areas it comprises 11 bedrooms or suites – including a 170 square metres (1,800 sq ft) master suite – as well as a sauna and swimming pool complex.

=== Interior ===
The interior design is by Antti Nurmesniemi, and furnishings by his wife Vuokko Nurmesniemi. With plain, white surfaces and large windows, the overall feel is light and airy. There is extensive use of natural wood and white marble, including in all the en-suite bathrooms.

Much of the furniture and lighting fixtures are designs by Alvar Aalto, and other contents feature Finnish arts and design by the likes of Timo Sarpaneva, Raimo Utriainen, Sam Vanni, Pentti Kaskipuro, and Rafael Wardi.

=== Refurbishment ===
The building was first renovated in 1998–2001.

In 2022–2024, a comprehensive refurbishment was carried out, at a cost of c. EUR 19m. As part of this, exterior and interior features were renovated and updated, security features were strengthened, and technical infrastructure modernised. Solar panels were fitted on the roof and a new ground source heat pump based heating system installed, to reduce the building's carbon footprint.
