= Hilton Helsinki Kalastajatorppa =

Hotel in Helsinki, Finland

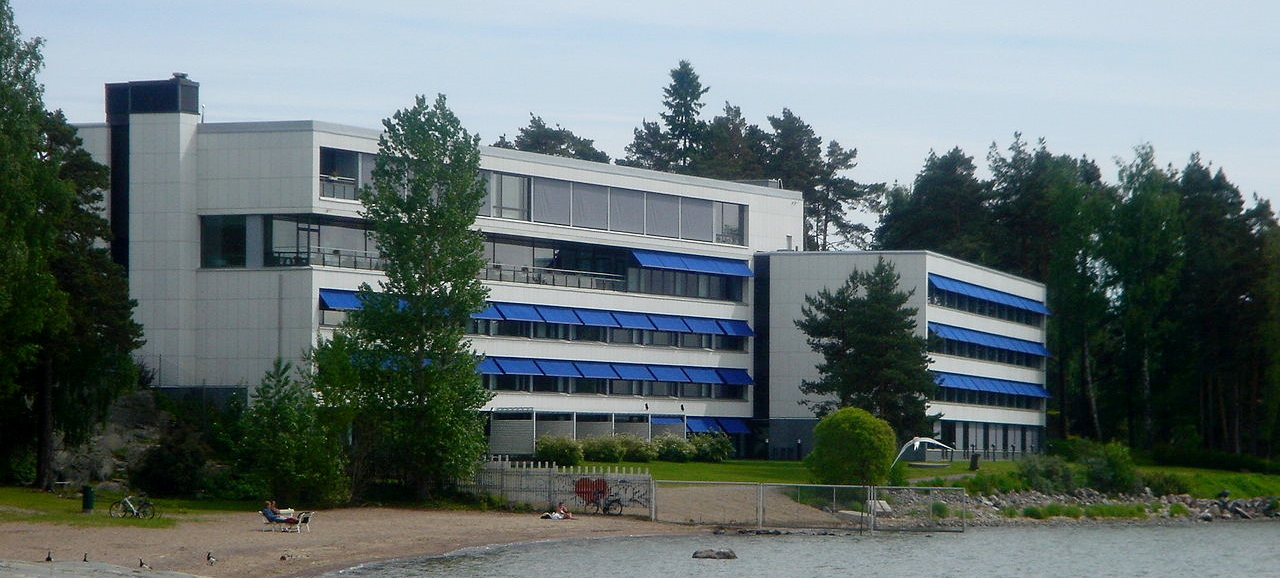
- New part of the Hotel

- Location within Helsinki (mainland)
- Hotel chain: Hilton Hotels & Resorts

General information
- Type: Hotel
- Location: Kalastajatorpantie 1, Helsinki, Finland
- Coordinates: 60.192539°N 24.873093°E
- Opened: 1969
- Owner: Hilton Worldwide

Other information
- Number of rooms: 238

Website
- Official website

Hilton Helsinki Kalastajatorppa (commonly referred to as Kalastajatorppa; literal translation The Fisherman's Croft) is a four-star international conference and banqueting hotel. The round restaurant was opened in 1939, the two hotel buildings in 1969 and 1975.

== History ==
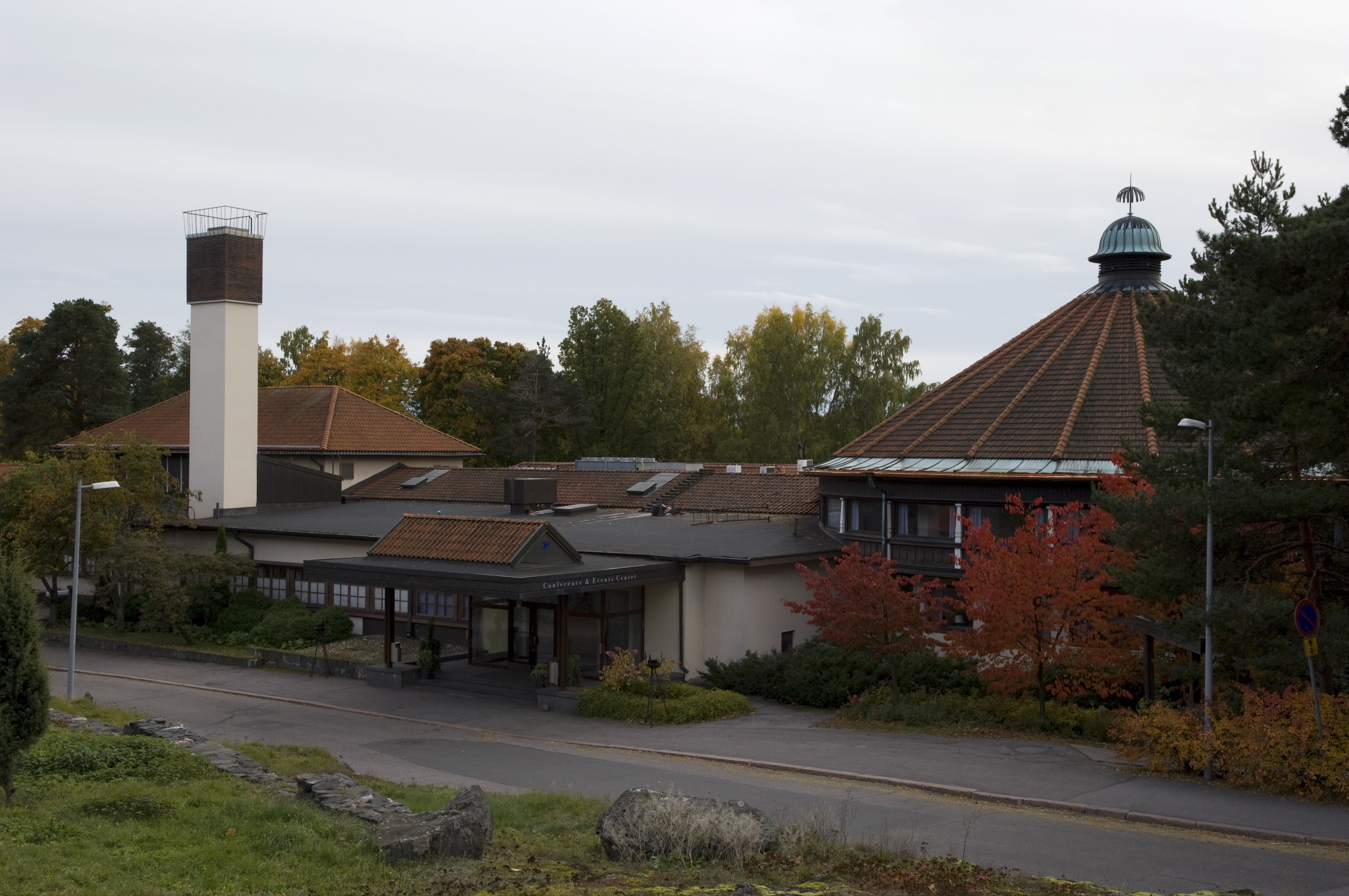
Old part of the Hotel

Hilton Helsinki Kalastajatorppa Hotel has a history as far back as 1910 when it was a fisherman's croft. It all started in a red wooden house, which became a cafeteria established by Brondin Bakery 1915. Eliel Saarinen, a famous Finnish architect, had a vision about Munkkiniemi area as a ”recreational area” but the First World War changed plans.

In 1920, a Tram line and tennis courts were built, then in 1932 the company “Fazer Bakery Ltd” buys the business and finally gets an authorization to sell liqueur. Four years later, in 1936 the red wooden building is being demolished and in 1937 ”Old Torppa” opens.

The new Kalastajatorppa restaurant opened to the public in July 1939 when the Colonial Hall and the symbol of the restaurant, the Round Hall, were commissioned. With terraces, Kalastajatorppa could serve 2,000 customers at a time, being the biggest restaurant in the Nordic countries. The restaurant was finished for the 1940 Summer Olympics, which were cancelled in 1939, due to the outbreak of World War II.

During the Winter War, the restaurant served as a Military Hospital.

The building served the Defence Forces during the Continuation War as well. After the wars, the restaurant's operations successfully continued. In 1952, Kalastajatorppa was sold to the Yhtyneet Ravintolat company.

The first hotel building was completed in 1969, designed by architect Markus Tavio – 77 rooms in the Seaside Wing. The newer and main hotel building was completed in 1975, with 158 rooms, designed by architect Einari Teräsvirta, just in time for the OSCE Conference. Finnish State Guesthouse is located near the hotel.

In 1998, Scandic Hotels bought Arctia. In 2001, Hilton Hotels & Resorts bought Scandic Hotels. It took two-and-a-half year refurbishment when everything was finally over and on 2004, Feb 2nd Hilton Helsinki Kalastajatorppa was opened.

== Events ==
A number of key entertainment events are arranged in Kalastajatorppa.

- In May 1952, Armi Kuusela was crowned as the first Finnish Maiden.
- A lot of fashion shows and concerts are organized there.
- Finland's first disco was held at Kalastajatorppa in 1966.
- Many world leaders have visited Kalastajatorppa over the years, including Yasser Arafat, Leonid Brezhnev, George H. W. Bush, Bill Clinton, Tenzin Gyatso, 14th Dalai Lama, Gerald Ford, Mikhail Gorbachev, Harald V of Norway, Trygve Lie, Jawaharlal Nehru, Mohammad Reza Pahlavi (and Farah Pahlavi), Vladimir Putin, Ronald Reagan (and Nancy Reagan), Helmut Schmidt, Donald Trump and Boris Yeltsin.
- Bilderberg Conference was held at Kalastajatorppa in 1994.
