= Reima Pietilä =

Finnish architect

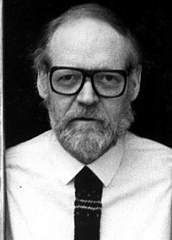
- Born: 25 August 1923; Turku
- Died: 26 August 1993 (aged 70); Helsinki
- Education: Helsinki University of Technology
- Occupation: Architect
- Spouse(s): Raili Pietilä (m. 1963–93; his death)
- Children: Annukka Pietilä
- Practice: Raili and Reima Pietilä architects (prev. Reima Pietilä and Raili Paatelainen)
- Buildings: Kaleva Church, Dipoli, Tampere Central Library, Mäntyniemi

Frans Reima Ilmari Pietilä (25 August 1923 – 26 August 1993) was a Finnish architect and theorist. He did most of his work together with his wife Raili Pietilä; after 1963 all their works were officially attributed to "Raili and Reima Pietilä". Reima Pietilä was a professor of architecture at the University of Oulu from 1973 to 1979.

== Life ==
Reima Pietilä was born in Turku, Finland. His father, Frans Viktor Pietilä, was a property owner and his mother, Ida Maria Lehtinen was a housewife. His parents had met each other in the US, when his mother was working as a domestic servant. He had an older sister, the artist Tuulikki Pietilä, who was the partner of the author Tove Jansson.

Reima Pietilä attended school in Turku, where he was a school friend of Mauno Koivisto, who would later become the President of Finland. Pietilä graduated in architecture 1953 at the Helsinki University of Technology (TKK). Reima and Raili commenced their collaboration in 1960 creating the office Reima Pietilä and Raili Paatelainen, renamed in 1975 to Raili and Reima Pietilä architects. Reima Pietilä and Raili Paatelainen were married in 1963. Their daughter and only child Annukka Pietilä (born 1963), is also a qualified architect.

== Career ==
Pietilä's career took off after winning the architectural competition for the Finnish Pavilion at the Brussels World Fair of 1958. This was followed by two other significant competition victories, the Kaleva Church in Tampere (1966) and the Dipoli Student Union building for Helsinki University of Technology (1966).

The life and career of Reima Pietilä has been well charted in the writings of British architectural historian-critics Roger Connah and Malcolm Quantrill, and to some extent also by the Norwegian architect, theorist and historian Christian Norberg-Schulz. Their basic question is to what extent Pietilä goes against the grain of a Finnish modernist architecture concerned with rationalism and economy. The whole question is problematic, however, because Finland's most famous architect, Alvar Aalto, was also seen as someone who broke the mold of pure modernism, someone who indeed talked about extending the notion of rationalism. Pietilä saw his work as organic architecture, but also very much as modern. Pietilä intellectualised his position, and was well-read in philosophy and modern literature. He was very much concerned with the issue of a phenomenology of place, epitomised by the Student Union building Dipoli (1961–1966) on the Otaniemi campus of Helsinki University of Technology. This concern for place also extended to his concerns about national identity and Finnishness, even exploring the Finnish language to generate architectural form. The same then applied also for his works abroad, in Kuwait and Delhi. Many of Reima Pietilä's theoretical writings were published in the journal Le Carré Bleu, a journal he jointly founded in Helsinki in 1958, together with fellow Finnish architects Aulis Blomstedt and Keijo Petäjä, Finnish architecture historian Kyösti Ålander, and French architect André Schimmerling, whom together formed the CIAM Helsinki group, the Finnish group associated with CIAM (Congrès Internationaux d'Architecture Moderne).

A major exhibition of the work of Reima and Raili Pietilä was held in 2008 at the Museum of Finnish Architecture in Helsinki, titled Raili and Reima Pietilä. Challenging Modern Architecture.

Raili and Reimä Pietilä designed a summer cottage for Reima's sister, the artist Tuulikki Pietilä. The famous summer cottage of Tove Jansson and Tuulikki Pietilä is situated on the remote archipelago island of Klovharu. The site was the inspiration for Moomin characters.

== Life and works ==
=== Significant buildings ===
- 1956–1958 Finnish pavilion at the Brussels World's Fair
- 1959–1966 The Kaleva Church in Tampere
- 1961–1966 Dipoli student assembly building in Otaniemi, Espoo
- 1962–1982 Suvikumpu residential area in Tapiola Espoo
- 1963–1985 Finnish Embassy in New Delhi India
- 1973–1975 The sauna at Hvitträsk in Kirkkonummi
- 1973–1982 Sief Palace Area Buildings in Kuwait City, Kuwait
- 1978–1986 Metso, Tampere Central Library
- 1979–1982 Lieksa Church in Lieksa northern Karelia
- 1979–1989 Shopping center and community center in Hervanta, Tampere
- 1984–1993 Mäntyniemi, Official Residence of the President of Finland in Helsinki

=== Significant theoretical texts by Reima Pietilä ===
- "The morphology of expressive space", Le Carré Bleu, 1958
- "Hobby Dogs", Finnish Architectural Review, 1967
- "Zone", Finnish Architectural Review, 1968
- "Space Garden", 1971
- "Eight ways to break free from rabbit-hutch architecture", Finnish Architectural Review, 1979
- "A Gestalt building", A+U, Tokyo, 1983
- "Architecture after Zero", 1984

== Image gallery ==
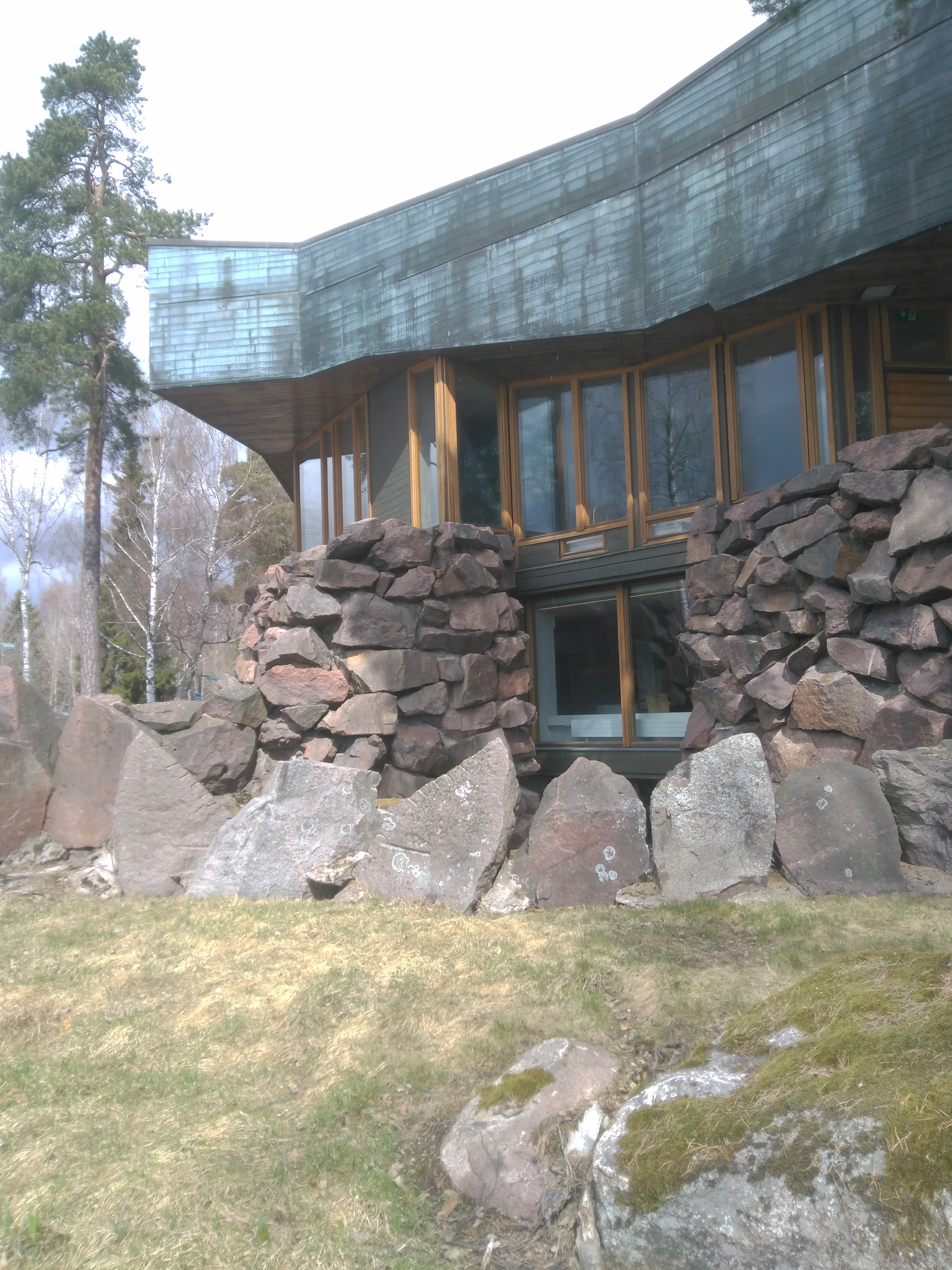
Dipoli Student Building, Espoo.

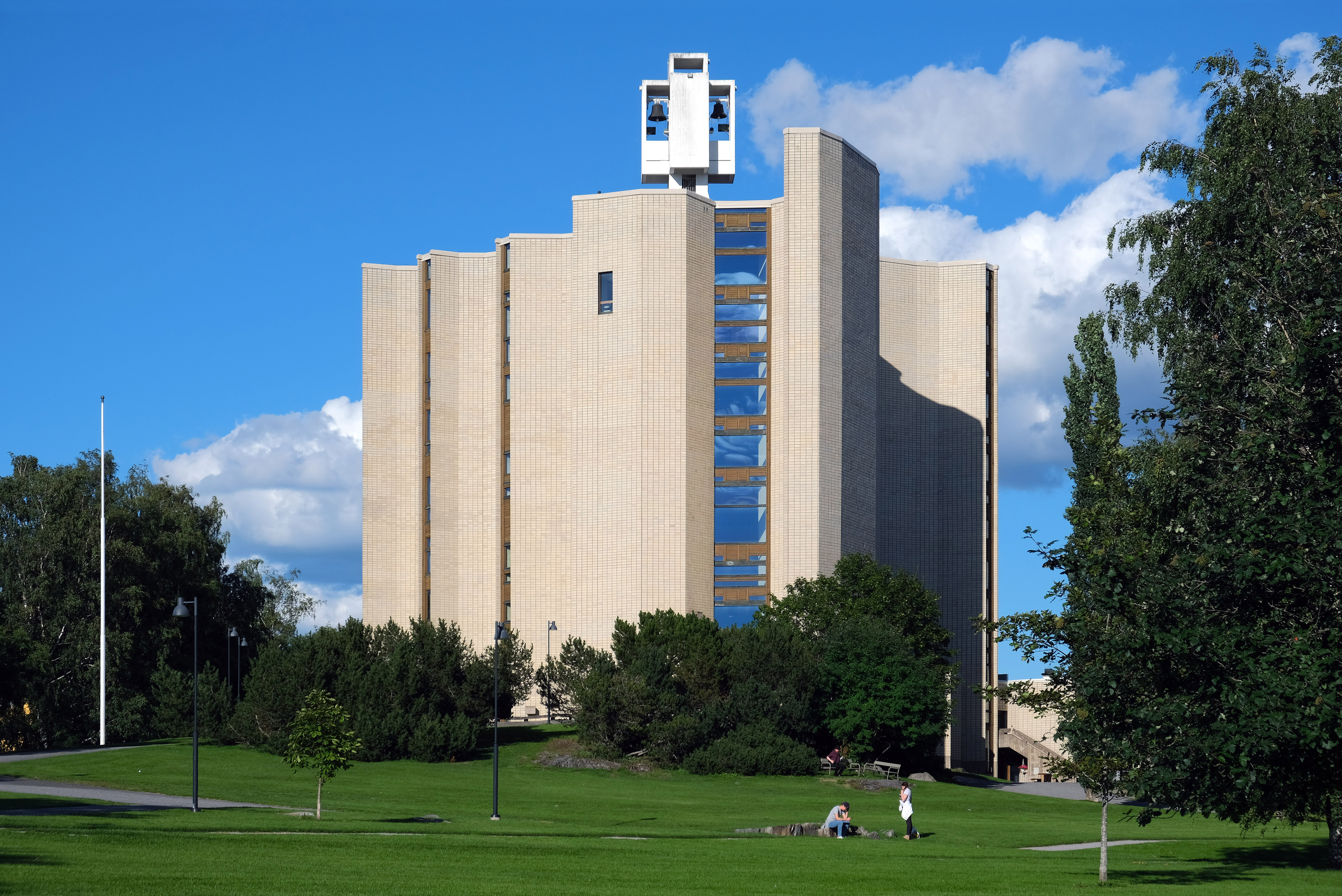
Kaleva Church in Tampere.

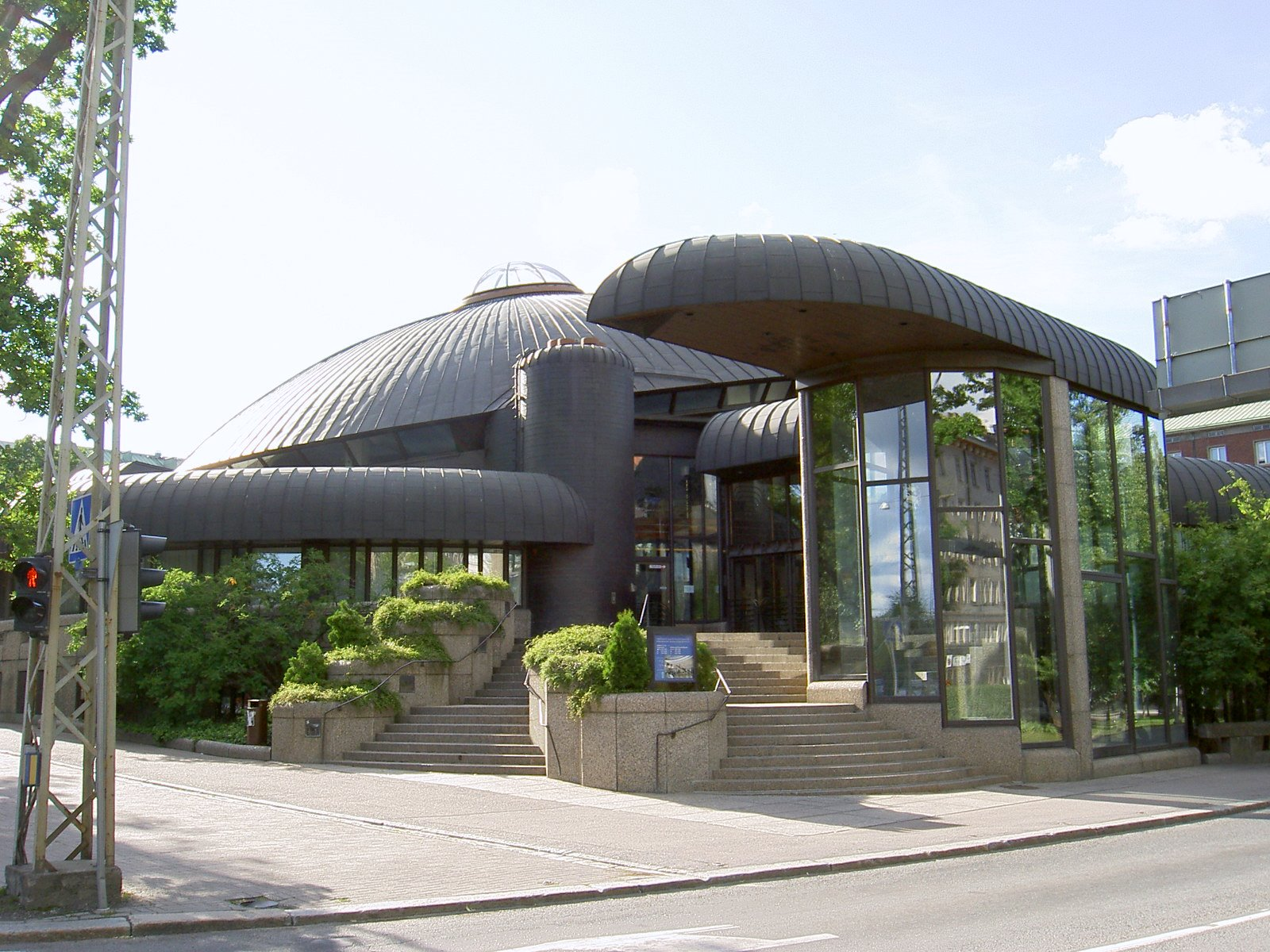
Metso, Tampere Central Library.

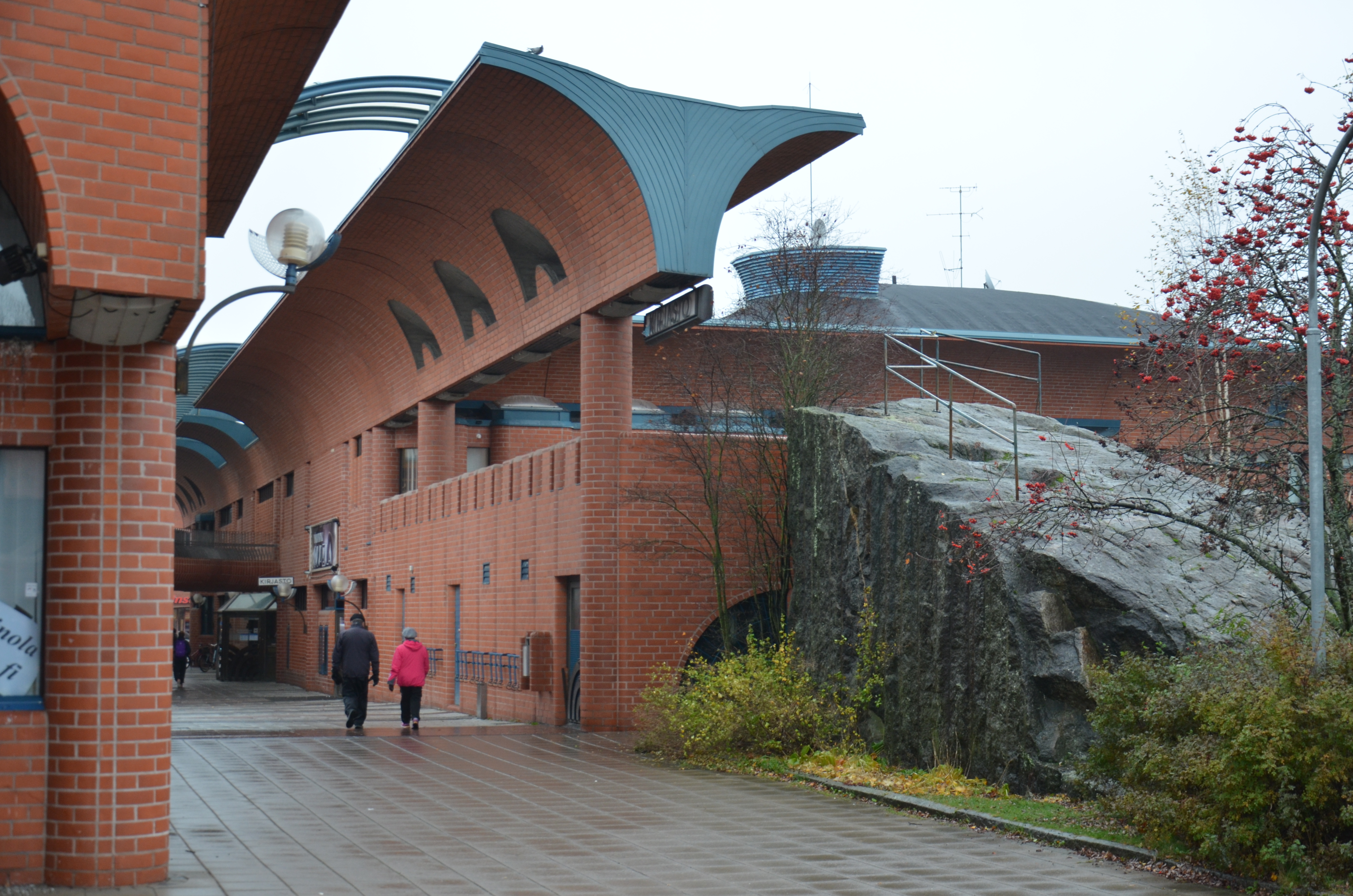
Community center complex in Hervanta, Tampere.

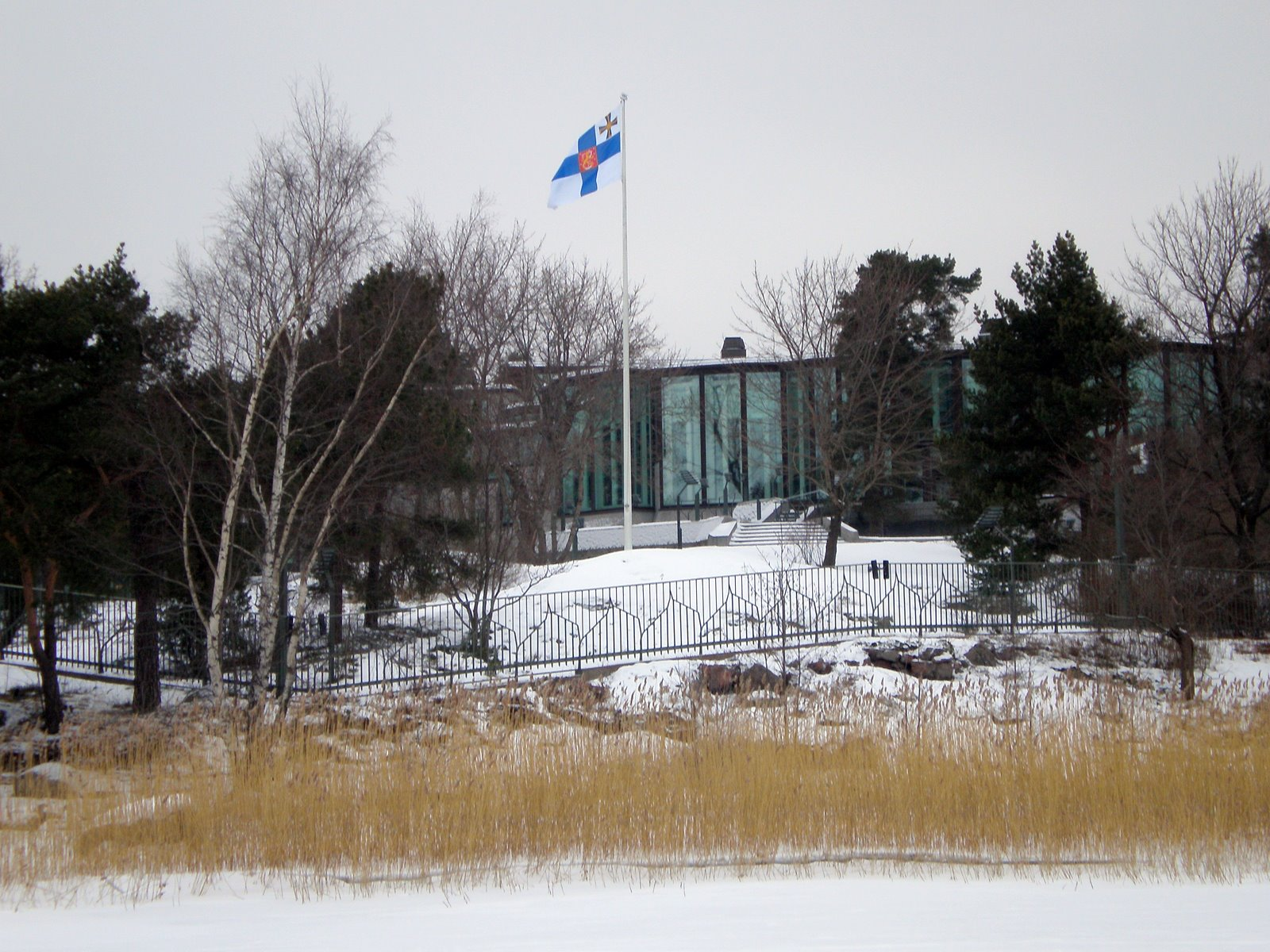
Official residence of the President of Finland, Mäntyniemi, Helsinki.
