= Police University College =

University of applied sciences in Tampere, Finland

Coordinates: 61.452643°N 23.852781°E

- Poliisiammattikorkeakoulu; Polisyrkeshögskolan
- The sword and lion emblem is the symbol of the Police of Finland
- Former names: Police Academy; Police Course Centre; National Police School; Police College of Finland
- Type: Public
- Established: 1918; 108 years ago
- Parent institution: National Police Board under the Ministry of the Interior
- Budget: €26 million (2016)
- Director: Kimmo Himberg
- Academic staff: Around 100 (2016)
- Administrative staff: Around 100 (2016)
- Students: 7,000 including short-time training courses (2016)
- Location: Tampere, Finland
- Campus: Suburb 21 ha
- Website: polamk.fi

The Police University College (Finnish: Poliisiammattikorkeakoulu (Polamk), Swedish: Polisyrkeshögskolan) is a university of applied sciences in Tampere, Finland providing police academy training and research under the Ministry of the Interior for the Police of Finland and other Finnish law enforcement units.

== History ==
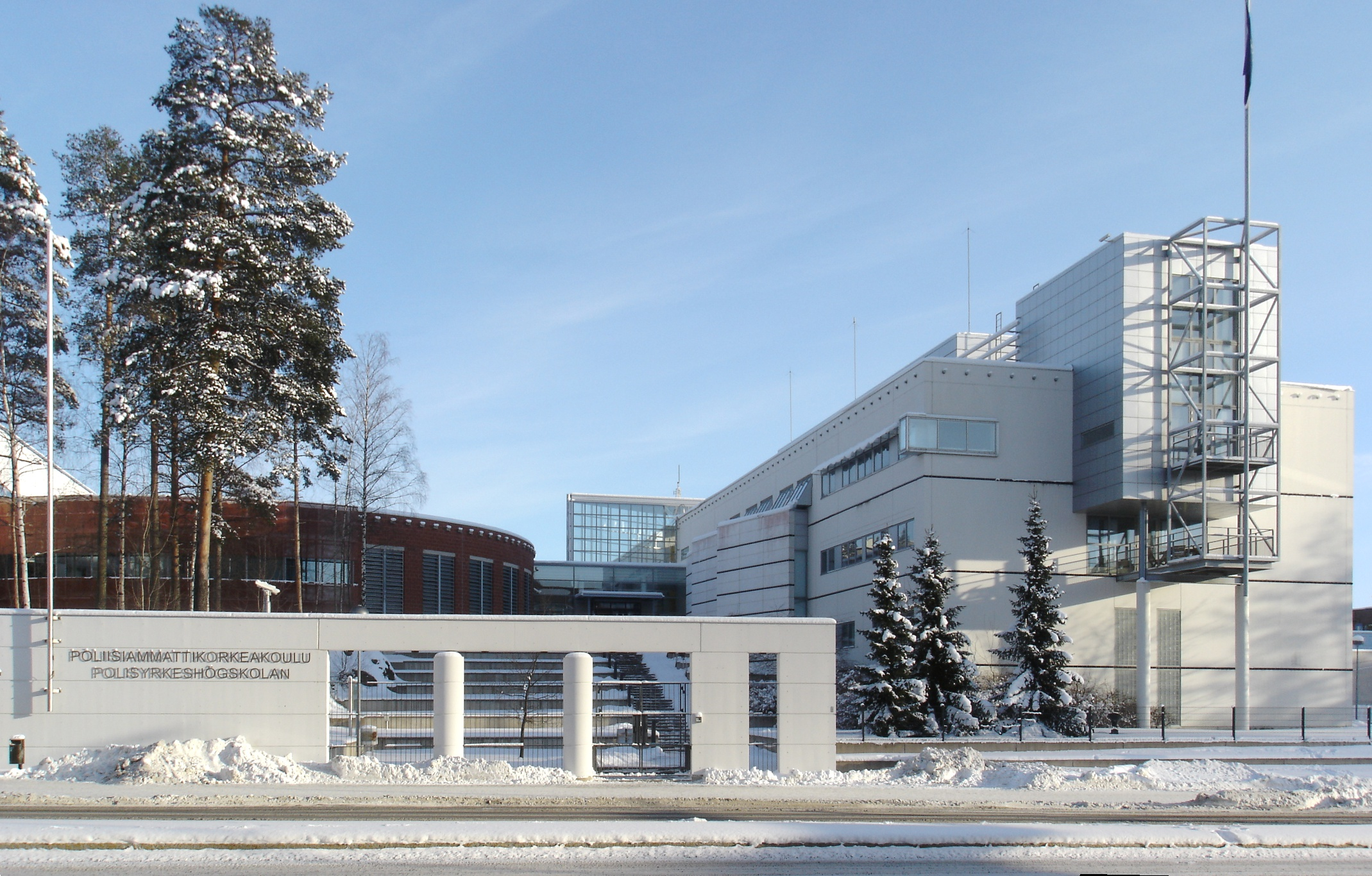
An entrance to the Police University College campus in Hervanta, Tampere, pictured in 2009

The institute was established in 1918 as a temporary police training school by the Helsinki Police Department. It operated as the Police Academy in various parts of the Greater Helsinki area, such as Espoo and the Suomenlinna fortress, until 1974 when the academy's Police Course Centre was transferred to Tampere. In 1986, the Police Course Centre became an independent unit, the National Police School, and moved to its current campus in the Hervanta suburb of Tampere in 1993—while the Police Academy continued in Espoo and was renamed as the Police College of Finland in 1998.

In 2008, the Police College of Finland and the National Police School were merged to become the sole police training institute in Finland and concentrated to the Hervanta campus. The institution continued under the name Police College of Finland until it was reorganized as a university of applied sciences and its name amended to Police University College in 2014.

== Education ==
The Police University College is responsible for overall police training and student selection, for organizing degree and advanced studies, and for applied research and development in the police field. The institution is under the guidance of the National Police Board and ultimately the Interior Ministry. It provides a bachelor's and a master's degree in police services and specialized courses, such as driver's courses and an executive MBA in policing. Furthermore, the institution publishes targeted research on police matters, such as analysis on hate crime.

All new police officers in Finland graduate from the institute and the bachelor's degree is considered a basic degree for law enforcement duties with training available in both Finnish and Swedish. In 2016, 132 police officers graduated from degree programmes and 6,100 people attended training outside the degree programmes offered by the University College. Likewise in 2016, the college received 4,318 applications for the bachelor's degree programme's intake of 300 students—an admittance rate of 7.0%.

== Organization and campus ==
The University College employed 209 personnel, half of whom are teaching staff and 40% police officers, at the end of 2016. Doctor of Laws Marko Viitanen has been the director since October 2016. The organization of the academy is divided vertically into seven competency areas under the director as of 2017:

- General Skills
- Special Skills
- Operational Skills
- Police Dog Operations
- Research, Development, and Innovation (RDI)
- Student Services
- Administration

The 21 hectare campus of the Police University College is located in the Hervanta suburb, eight kilometres from the centre of Tampere. Besides teaching, sports and dormitory facilities, the campus contains a simulation training city and a driver training track. Two separate installations, the police dog training centre in Hämeenlinna and the driver training centre in Pieksämäki, are also a part of the academy's structure.

== See also ==
- Crime in Finland
- Education in Finland
- European Union Agency for Law Enforcement Training (CEPOL)
- University of Tampere
