= Raili Pietilä =

Finnish architect (1926–2021)

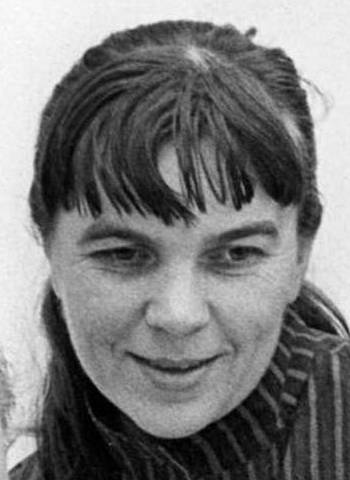
- Born: Raili Inkeri Marjatta Paatelainen; 15 August 1926; Pieksämäki
- Died: 16 May 2021 (aged 94); Helsinki
- Education: Helsinki University of Technology
- Occupation: Architect
- Spouse(s): Reima Pietilä (m. 1963–93; his death)
- Children: Annukka Pietilä
- Practice: Raili and Reima Pietilä architects (prev. Reima Pietilä and Raili Paatelainen)

Raili Inkeri Marjatta Pietilä (née Paatelainen, 15 August 1926 – 16 May 2021) was a Finnish architect. She did most of her work together with her husband Reima Pietilä; after 1963 all their works were officially attributed to "Raili and Reima Pietilä".

Raili Paatelainen graduated in architecture 1956 at the Helsinki University of Technology. In 1949–1951 she worked for architect and town planner Olli Kivinen and in 1959–1960 for architect Olaf Küttner.

Reima and Raili commenced their collaboration in 1960 creating the office Reima Pietilä and Raili Paatelainen, renamed in 1975 to Raili and Reima Pietilä architects. Reima Pietilä and Raili Paatelainen were married in 1963. Their daughter and only child Annukka Pietilä (born 1963), is also a qualified architect.
