= Bypass (road) =

Road that bypasses a built-up area

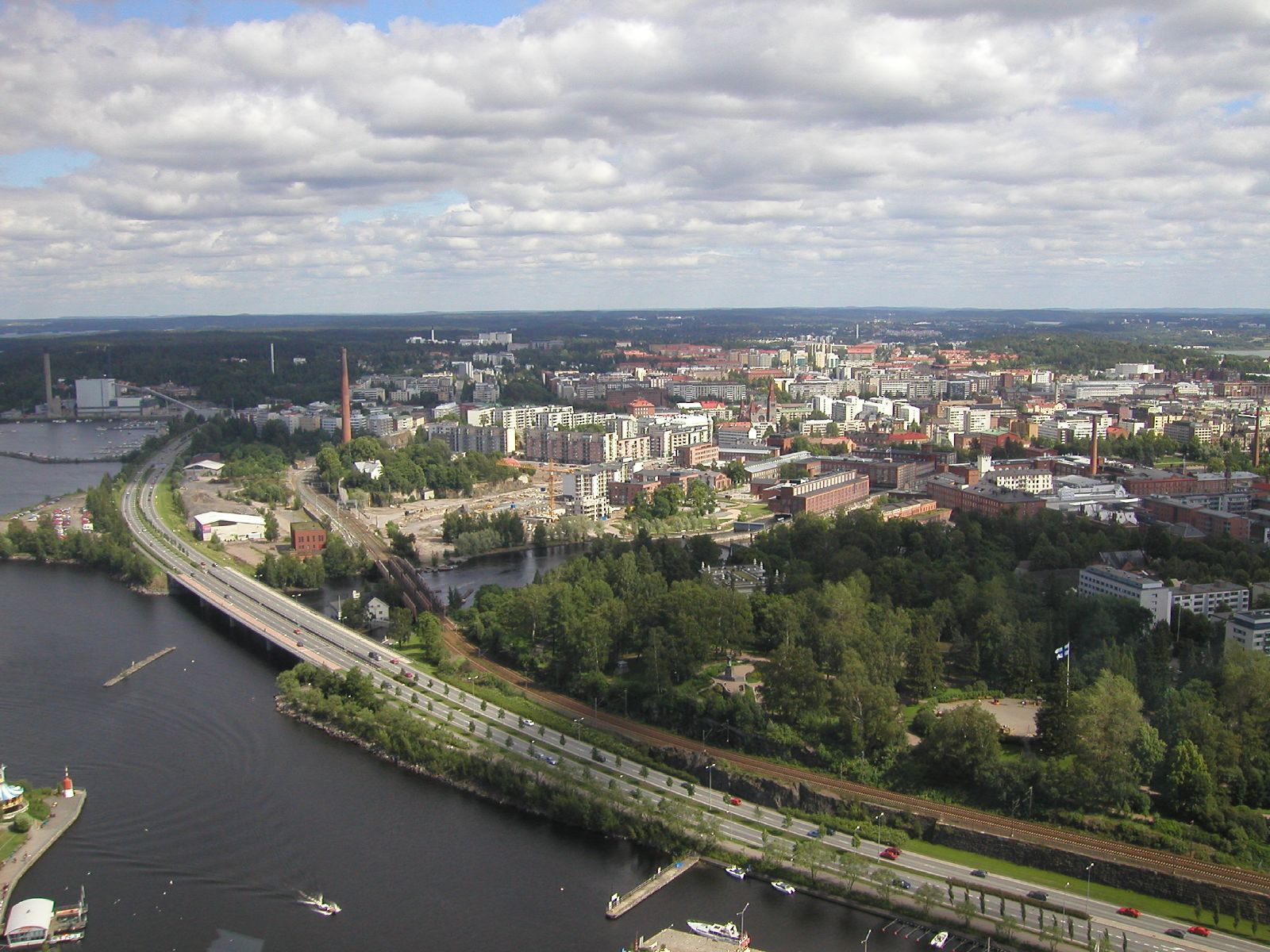
In the picture, the bypass section called Paasikiven–Kekkosentie of the Highway 12 bypasses the city center of Tampere in Pirkanmaa, Finland. Highway 12 was moved between Santalahti and Naistenlahti to the Tampere Tunnel in 2016.

A bypass is a road or highway that avoids or "bypasses" a built-up area, town, or village, to let through traffic flow without interference from local traffic, to reduce congestion in the built-up area, to improve road safety and as replacement for obsolete roads that are no longer in use as a result of devastating natural disasters (earthquakes, tsunamis, landslides, volcanic eruptions). A bypass specifically designated for trucks may be called a truck route.

If there are no strong land use controls, buildings are often built in town along a bypass, converting it into an ordinary town road, and the bypass may eventually become as congested as the local streets it was intended to avoid. Many businesses are often built there for ease of access, while homes are often avoided for noise and pollution reasons.

Bypass routes are often on new land where no road originally existed. This creates a conflict between those who support a bypass to reduce congestion in a built-up area and/or as replacement for roads that became obsolete and those who oppose the development of (often rural) undeveloped land. A city may also oppose the project, because of the potential reduction in city core.

For other reasons (e.g. natural disasters), construction of bypass routes may be started if there was a research about natural disaster green (safe) zones using space satellite-based mapping first before building them.

== Canada ==
In Ontario, examples include the Donald Cousens Parkway (formerly named the Markham Bypass from 2004 to 2006) and the Box Grove Bypass in the city of Markham; and in Toronto a section of Highway 401 was called the Toronto Bypass in the 1950s when the highway was built as a bypass of Highway 2, Ontario Highway 2A which was built to bypass Highway 2 between Toronto and Newcastle, and the Caledonia Bypass, a section of Highway 6 in Caledonia.

In Nova Scotia, the section of Highway 104 between Thomson Station and Masstown is colloquially named the Cobequid Pass; this name is for a section of road that bypasses the Wentworth Valley by crossing the Cobequid Mountains.

== United Kingdom ==
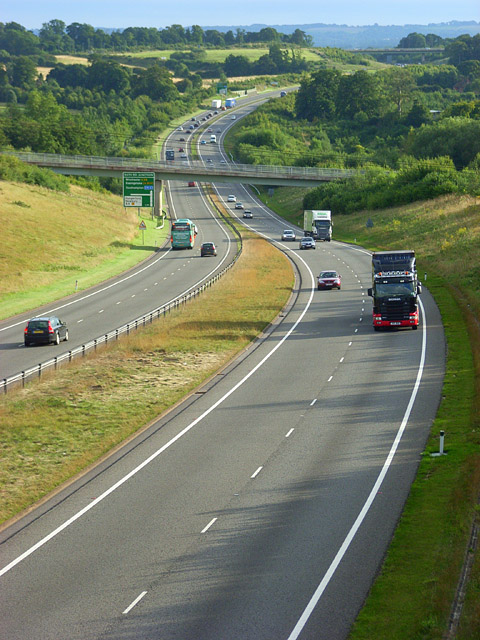
The Newbury bypass near Donnington

The idea of bypasses predates the use of motor vehicles. The first (northern) London bypass, the present Marylebone Road between Paddington and Islington, was started in 1756.

Bypasses can take many years to gain planning approval and funding. Many towns and villages have been campaigning for bypasses for over 30 years e.g. Banwell in North Somerset.

There was large-scale protest during construction of the Newbury bypass—officially known as the Winchester–Bicester Trunk Road (A34) (Newbury Bypass)—a 9-mile (14 km) stretch of dual carriageway which bypasses the town of Newbury in Berkshire, England. The protest was popularly known as the Third Battle of Newbury, a name which was also adopted by one of the main protest groups. The name was chosen in reference to the First Battle of Newbury of 1643 and the Second Battle of Newbury of 1644, both of which took place close to the town during the English Civil War.

== United States ==
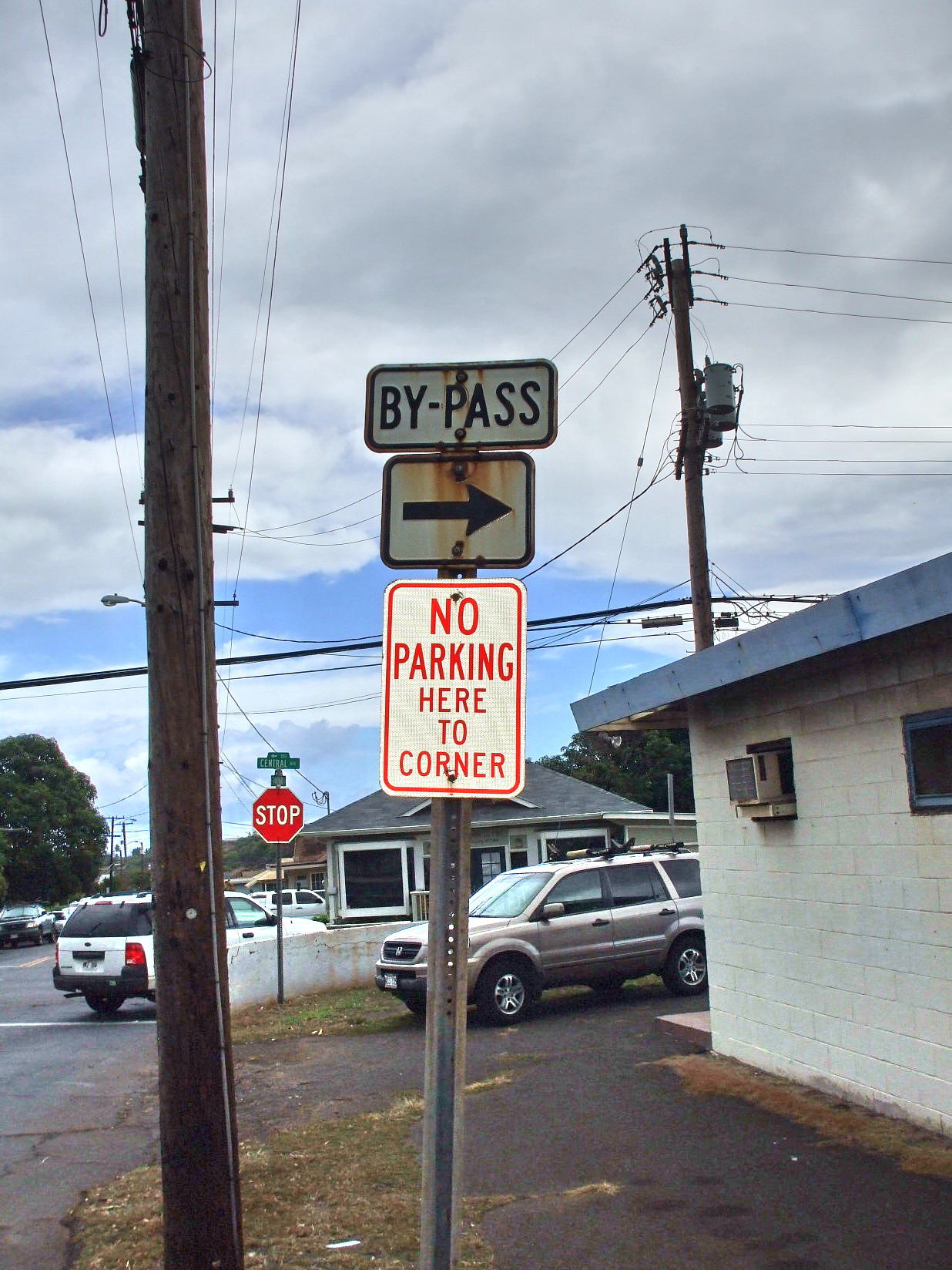
Old by-pass sign on Maui for State Route 30 thru surface streets

In the United States, bypass routes are a type of special route used on an alternative routing of a highway around a town when the main route of the highway goes through the town. The original designation of these routes were "truck routes" to divert through truck traffic away from the town, but the designation was changed to "bypass" in 1959 by AASHTO. However, many "truck" routes remain where the mainline of the highway is prohibited for trucks.

In a few cases, both a bypass and a business route exist, each with auxiliary signs (e.g. U.S. Route 60 in Lexington, Kentucky). Bypass routes are less common than business routes. Many of those that existed before the era of Interstate Highways have lost their old designations. For example, in Missouri, the old bypass route of U.S. Route 71 to the east of Kansas City, Missouri was decommissioned as Interstate 435 supplanted it; the remainder that existed as suburban surface route became Missouri Route 291. Around St. Louis, Missouri, what had been U.S. Route 50 Bypass was absorbed into a diversion of U.S. Route 50 from Interstate 44 and Interstate 64.

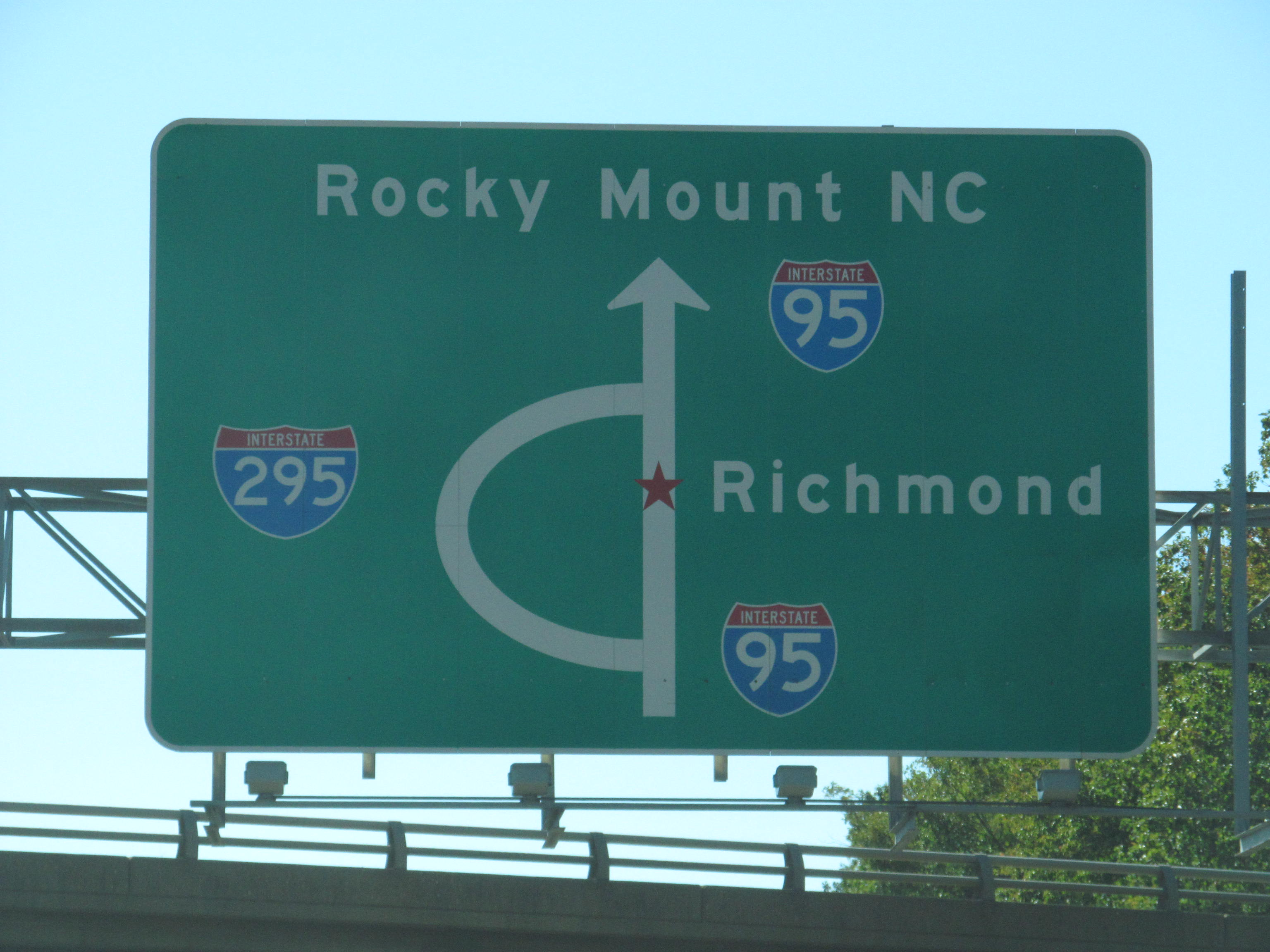
Overhead sign along Interstate 95 displaying Interstate 295 as a bypass route for Richmond, Virginia

In the Interstate Highway System in the United States, primary routes are designated with a one- or two-digit number, while bypasses and loops are generally designated with a three-digit number beginning with an even digit. However, there are many exceptions to this convention, where routes with three-digit numbers serve the main route through town while the routes with one- or two-digit numbers serve as the bypass. A few such examples can be found in the metropolitan areas of Des Moines, Iowa (Interstate 235 goes through downtown, while Interstate 35 and Interstate 80 bypass downtown), Omaha, Nebraska (Interstate 480 traverses the downtown area, while Interstate 80 is one of the bypasses), and Pittsburgh, Pennsylvania (the city is served by Interstate 279 and Interstate 376, while Interstate 70, Interstate 76, and Interstate 79 all bypass city limits).

Another meaning of the term bypass route (usually simply called a bypass) is a highway that was constructed to bypass an area that is often congested with traffic. This includes Interstate Highway beltways and U.S. Highways constructed to circumvent downtown areas. Examples of these are U.S. Route 60 bypassing Williamsburg, Virginia, Interstate 285 bypassing Downtown Atlanta, U.S. Route 20/U.S. Route 31 bypassing metro South Bend, Indiana (on the St. Joseph Valley Parkway), and Interstate 75 bypassing Tampa and St. Petersburg, Florida. These bypasses usually carry mainline routes rather than auxiliary "bypass" routes.

The first bypass route in the United States was completed in 1958 as Alabama State Route 210 (Ross Clark Circle) in Dothan, Alabama.

=== Shoofly ===
In the United States, the term shoofly – a borrowing from railroad jargon – is also sometimes used to refer to a short temporary roadway built to bypass a construction site or other temporary obstruction. The U.S. Manual on Uniform Traffic Control Devices uses the term "diversion".

== Brazil ==
In Brazil the widest and busiest bypasses are located in the state of São Paulo, and many of them intersect and merge around large cities to form ring-like systems. Most notably the Rodoanel Mário Covas, which encircles the city of São Paulo and passes through other cities in the metropolitan area, is the largest project of such type with a planned total length of 180 km upon completion. It is divided into sections and connected to major highways and while not being a toll road itself, accesses to other motorways are often placed through toll booths.

== Asia ==
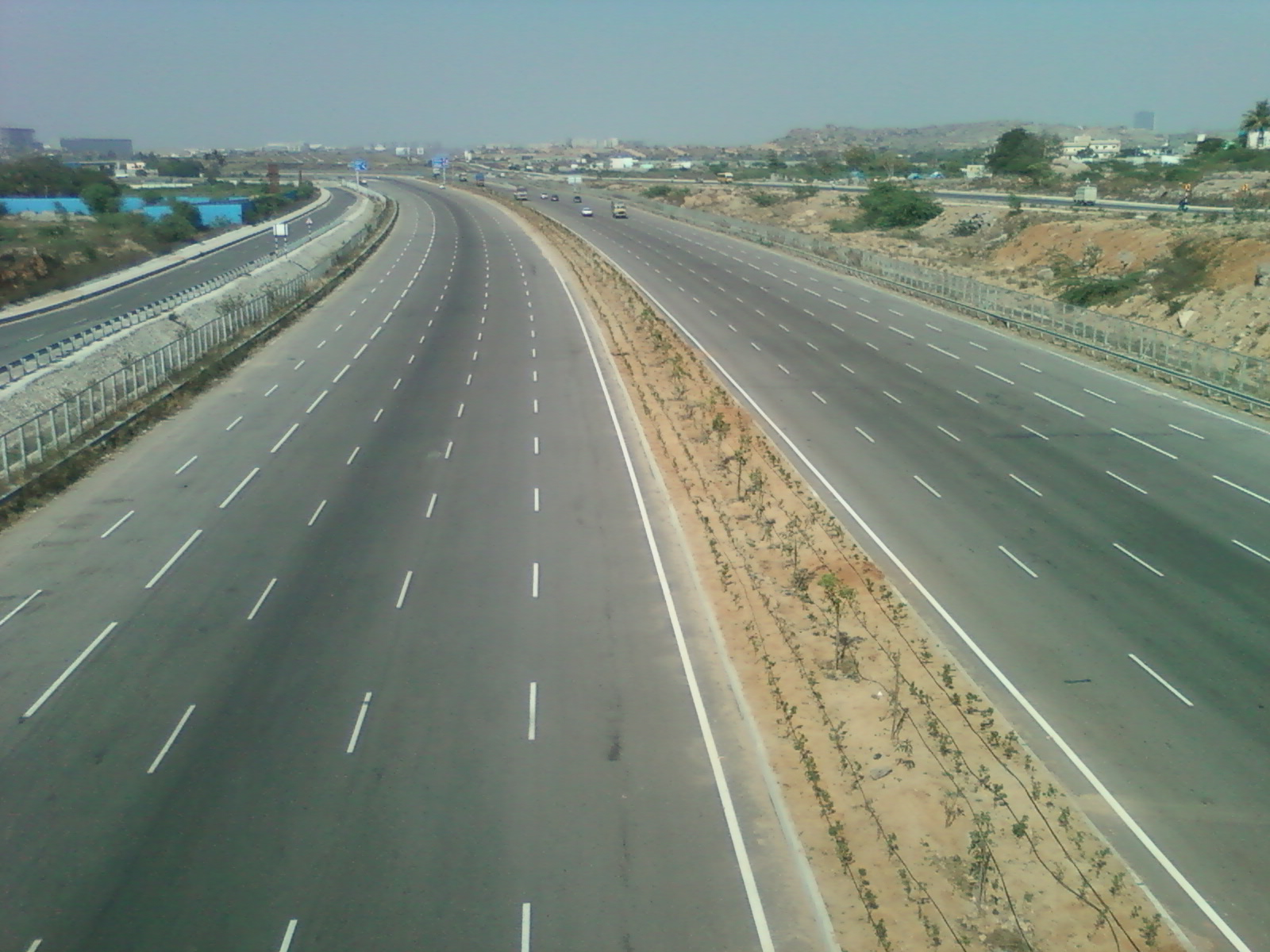
Outer Bypass Road (Atal ORR) at Narsinghi, Hyderabad in India

=== Hong Kong ===
Hong Kong contains several bypasses. The first are the Island Eastern Corridor, the East Kowloon Corridor, the West Kowloon Corridor, and the Lung Cheung and Ching Cheung Roads. Later ones are named directly as bypasses, such as Kwun Tong Bypass, Hung Hom Bypass, and the Ma On Shan Bypass. Other bypasses include the Tai Po Section of the Tolo Highway, the section within the Tuen Mun New Town of the Tuen Mun Road, the Yuen Long Highway, and the West Kowloon Highway. The Central-Wan Chai Bypass, which costs HK$28.1 billion, is a series of tunnels between Central and Causeway Bay.

=== Malaysia ===
Malaysia also contain several bypasses such as Rawang Bypass, Kajang Bypass, Bidor Bypass and Kuala Terengganu Bypass.

=== Philippines ===
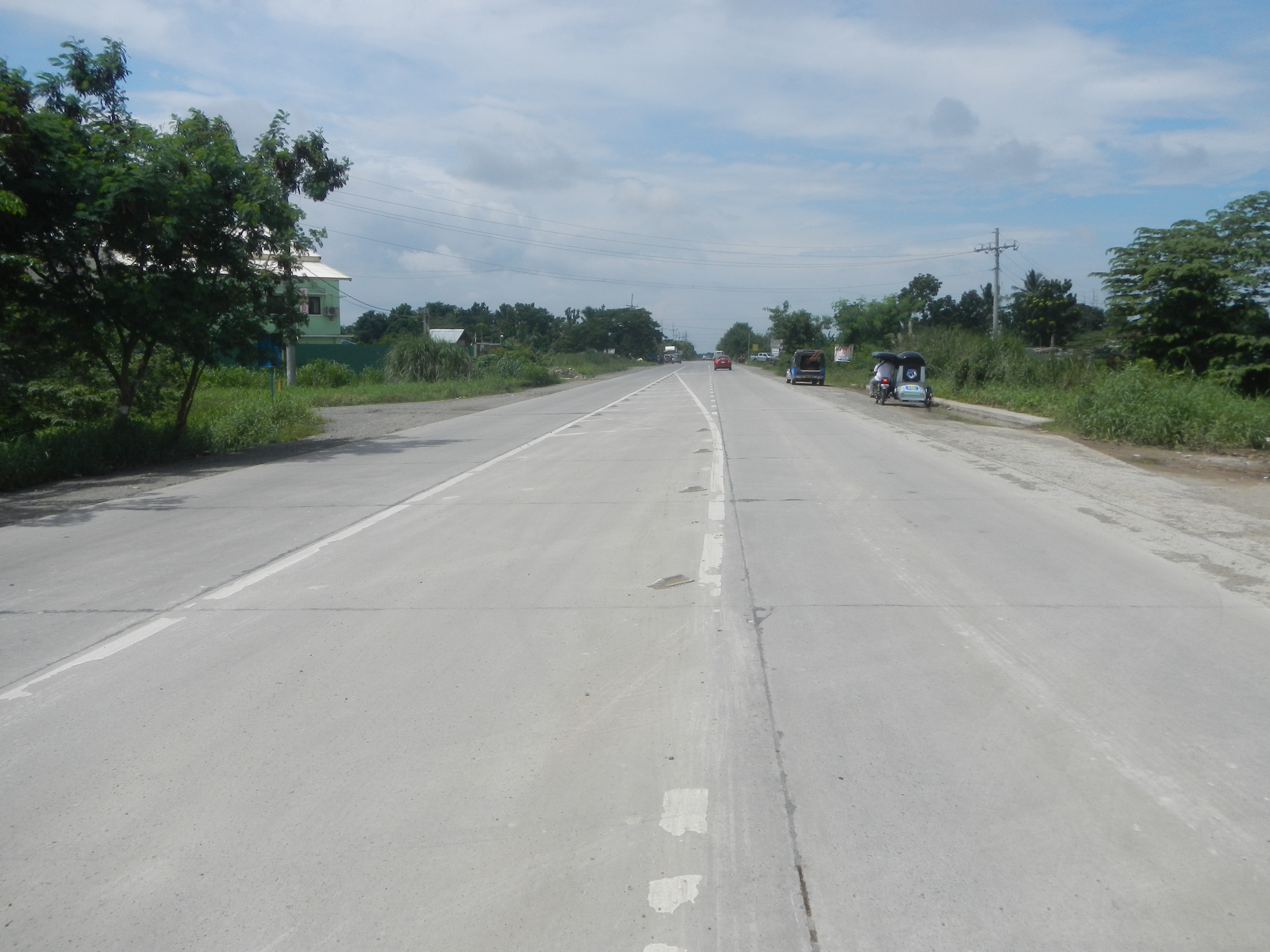
Plaridel Bypass Road in Bulacan serves as an alternative route to the Pan-Philippine Highway.

Bypass roads (or in other cases "diversion roads") in the Philippines are common on national highways passing through densely populated city or municipal centers (poblacion). Local governments usually promote construction of bypasses where the existing highway through the city or town center becomes heavily congested and cannot be physically expanded economically without impacting buildings or utilities. Bypass roads are usually planned to ensure the original highway alignment is downgraded to primarily local access. Control of access to properties is taken in account to avoid uncontrolled land development.

== Bypass road signs around the world ==
Layout of detour or bypass route (Bosnia and Herzegovina)

Layout of detour or bypass route (Bulgaria)

Layout of detour or bypass route (Croatia)

Layout of detour or bypass route (Estonia)

Detour or bypass signpost (Estonia)

Direction of destination bypass sign (Estonia)

Direction of pedestrian bypass sign (Estonia)

Layout of detour or bypass route (Finland)

Direction to detour or bypass route (Finland)

Detour or bypass signpost (Germany)

Detour or bypass sign (U3) (Germany)

Umleitung
Detour or bypass sign (Germany)

End of Detour or bypass (Germany)

Planskizze
Layout of detour or bypass route (Germany)

Umlenkungspfeil (Streckenempfehlung)
Existing alternate or bypass Autobahn route (Germany)

End of alternate or bypass Autobahn route (Germany)

Layout of detour or bypass route (Lithuania)

Direction to detour or bypass route (Lithuania)

Direction to detour or bypass route (Lithuania)

Layout of detour or bypass route (North Macedonia)

Heavy vehicle bypass 200 m ahead (New Zealand)

Heavy vehicle bypass 300 m ahead (New Zealand)

Heavy vehicle bypass to the left (New Zealand)

Heavy vehicle bypass to the right (New Zealand)

Heavy vehicle bypass to the both directions (New Zealand)

Layout of detour or bypass route (Poland)

Direction to detour or bypass route (Poland)

Layout of detour or bypass route (Serbia)

Layout of detour or bypass route (Slovakia)

Direction to detour or bypass route signpost (Slovakia)

Direction to destination bypass signpost (Slovakia)

Direction to truck bypass signpost (Slovakia)

Direction to bicycle bypass signpost (Slovakia)

Bypass plate (Slovakia)

Bypass route plate (Slovakia)

Truck bypass plate (Slovakia)

Bicycle bypass plate (Slovakia)

Direction to destination bypass sign (Slovakia)

Direction to bypass route sign (Slovakia)

Direction to truck bypass sign (Slovakia)

Direction to bicycle bypass sign (Slovakia)

Destination bypass sign (Slovakia)

Bypass route sign (Slovakia)

Bypass for trucks sign (Slovakia)

Bypass for bicycles sign (Slovakia)

Layout of detour or bypass route (Slovenia)

Bypass plate (United States)

Combined bypass plate (white) and toll plate (yellow) (United States)

Bypass plate (orange) (United States)

Bypass plate (green) (United States)

Bypass plate (blue) (United States)

Bypass plate (brown) (United States)

== See also ==
Types of special routes in the United States

- Special route
- Alternate route
- Business route
- Link road
- List of special routes of the United States Numbered Highway System
- List of business routes of the Interstate Highway System
- Ring road
- National Highway No. 3 (Taiwan)
