= Tampella (district) =

City district in Tampere, Finland

Coordinates: 61°30′10″N 23°45′50″E

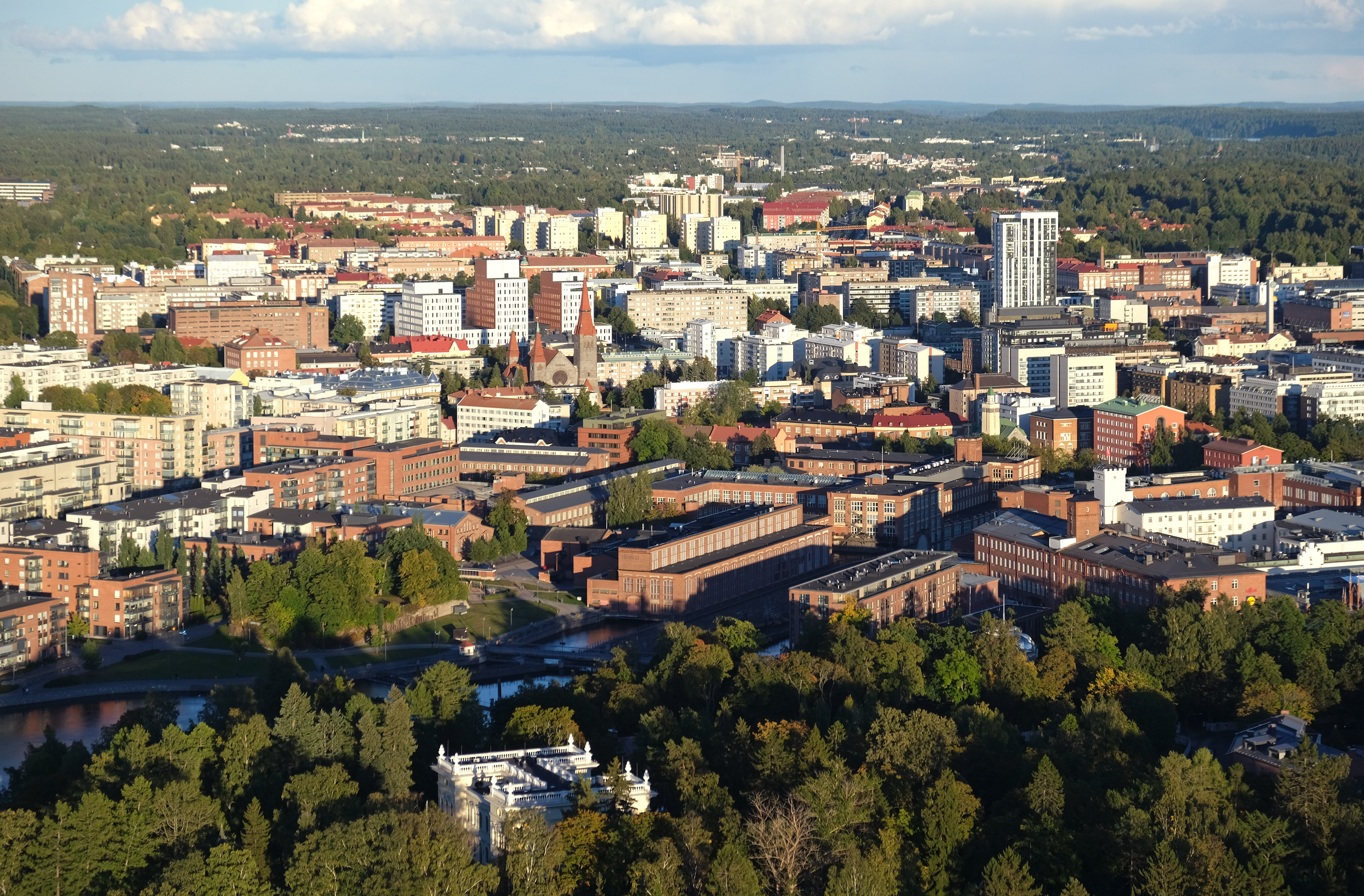
A view of Tampella from Näsinneula

Tampella (until 2002 known as Naistenlahti) is a neighbourhood in the northern part of the city center of Tampere, Finland. It consists of the old Tampella factory area, the Armonkallio residential area and the Naistenlahti harbor area. The neighboring parts of the internally heterogeneous district located on the shores of Lake Näsijärvi are Lapinniemi, Lappi, Osmonmäki, Tammela, Jussinkylä, Finlayson and Särkänniemi.

The Naistenlahti Power Plant operates on the shores of Lake Näsijärvi in Tampella. The Vapriikki Museum Centre is also located in the district.

== See also ==
- Paasikiven–Kekkosentie
- Tampere Tunnel
- Naistenmatka, a town center of Pirkkala
