= Särkänniemi (district) =

City district in Tampere, Finland

Coordinates: 61°30′10″N 23°44′30″E

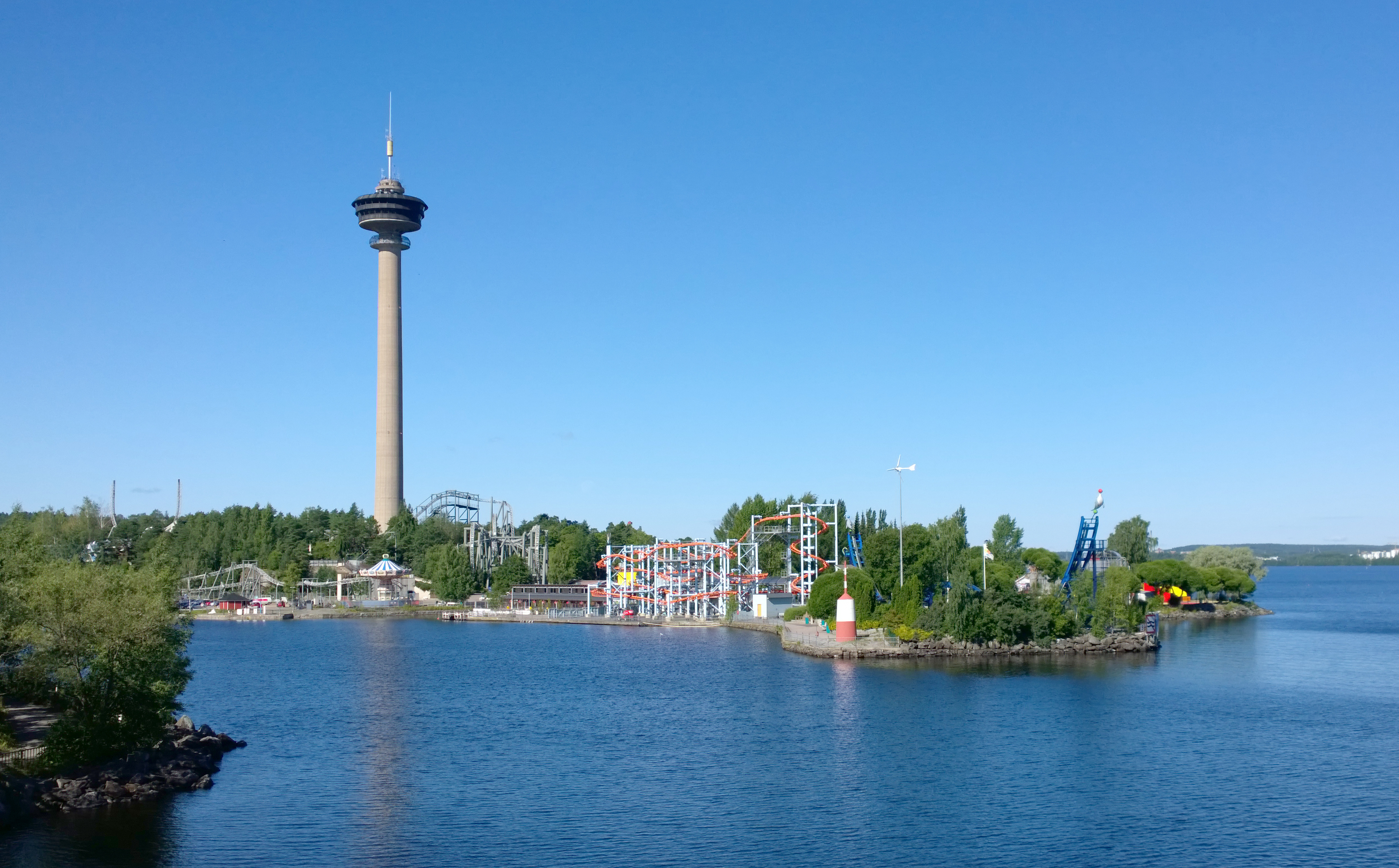
Näsinneula and the Särkänniemi Amusement Park

Särkänniemi is a district of the city centre of Tampere, Finland, located on the shores of Lake Näsijärvi, north of the districts of Amuri and Finlayson. The most famous sights of the district are Näsinneula and Särkänniemi Amusement Park, but in addition to that, the district also houses the Haarla's old paper mill building. The Amuri railway stop has also ceased operations in Särkänniemi. The Särkänniemi district also includes the Siilinkari islet in Lake Näsijärvi. Särkänniemi is bordered on the south by Paasikivenkatu (formerly Paasikiventie), on the other side of which is the Amuri district, and on the west by the Santalahti district. The district includes the Onkiniemi residential area.

The Särkänniemi district is joined by Santalahti on its west side, which is named after the bay of the same name in Lake Näsijärvi. The first industrial plant in the area was the Eliander match factory, founded in 1852; Sahanterä Oy (1889), Näsijärven Pahvitehdas (1909) and Haarla Paper Mill (1920) were born later. On the west side of Särkänniemi, Onkiniemi was a popular beach as early as the 19th century. The first sub-town plan of Särkänniemi was approved in 1915 and the town plan of the whole area in 1921 and the town plan of Santalahti in 1945. Some of the streets in the area have been named according to the factory's owner families; The founder of the Haarla paper mill, Rafael Haarla, a trade counselor, according to whom Haarlankatu has been named, donated the statues of Hämeensilta to the city of Tampere in 1929.

A hotel and spa with restaurants and water experiences are planned around the amusement park, as well as new apartments. It will also be possible to travel to the area by tram in the future as part of the Tampere light rail network.
