= Santalahti =

City district in Tampere, Finland

Coordinates: 61.507070471887204°N 23.70987899667807°E

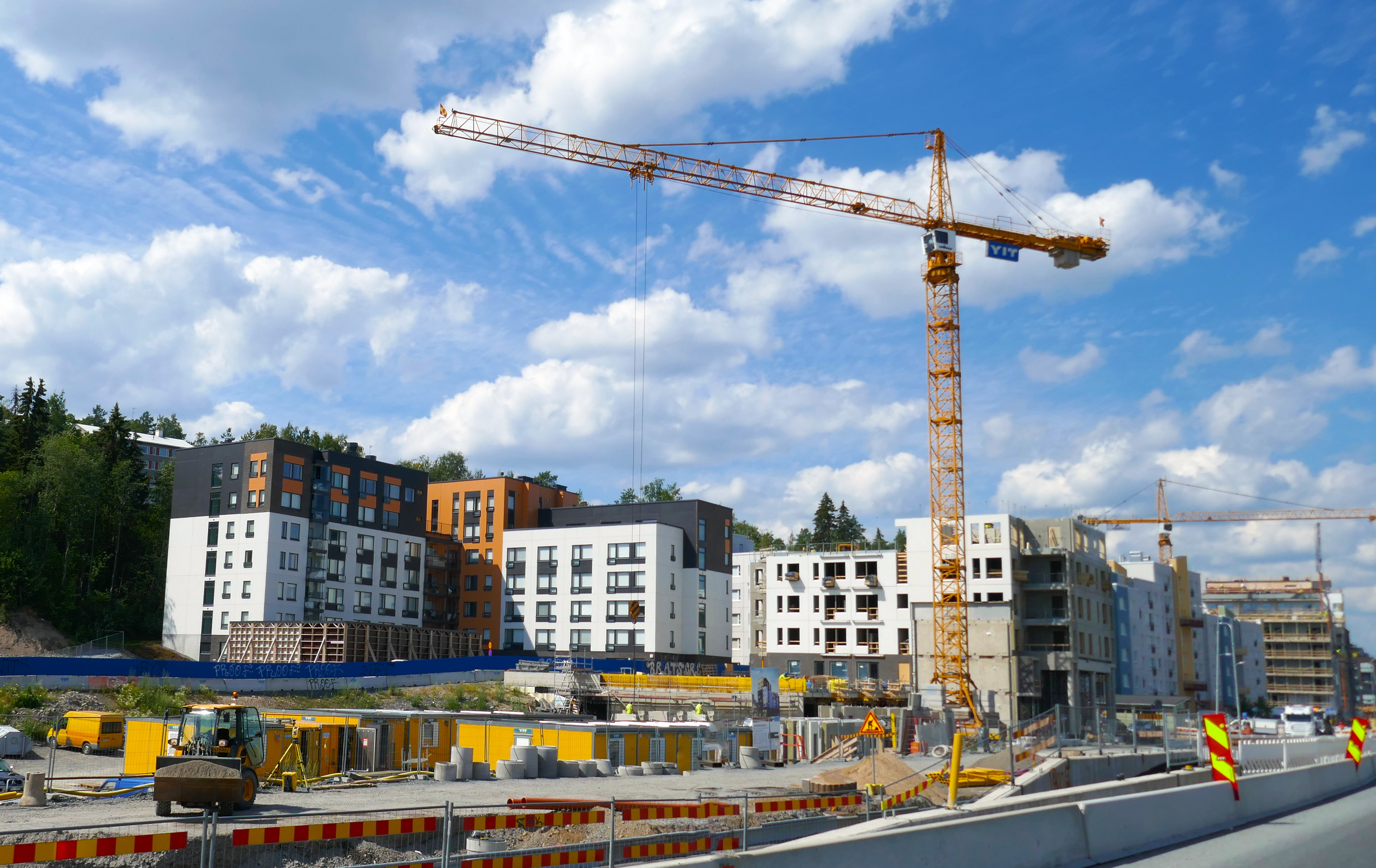
Apartment buildings under construction in Santalahti

Santalahti is a district in the western part of Tampere, Finland. It borders Lake Näsijärvi in the north, the Särkänniemi district in the east, Ylä-Pispala and Ala-Pispala in the south and Lielahti in the west. The town plan of Santalahti was confirmed in 1945.

There are several abandoned factory buildings in Santalahti that currently serve as graffiti galleries. OTK's old match factory will be repaired and it will have a kindergarten. The area has also been rebuilt as a home for thousands of residents. Santalahti has once been one of the railway stops for the Tampere-Seinäjoki railway. Designed by architect Bruno Granholm and completed in 1907, the site was demolished after the site was closed in the 1970s.

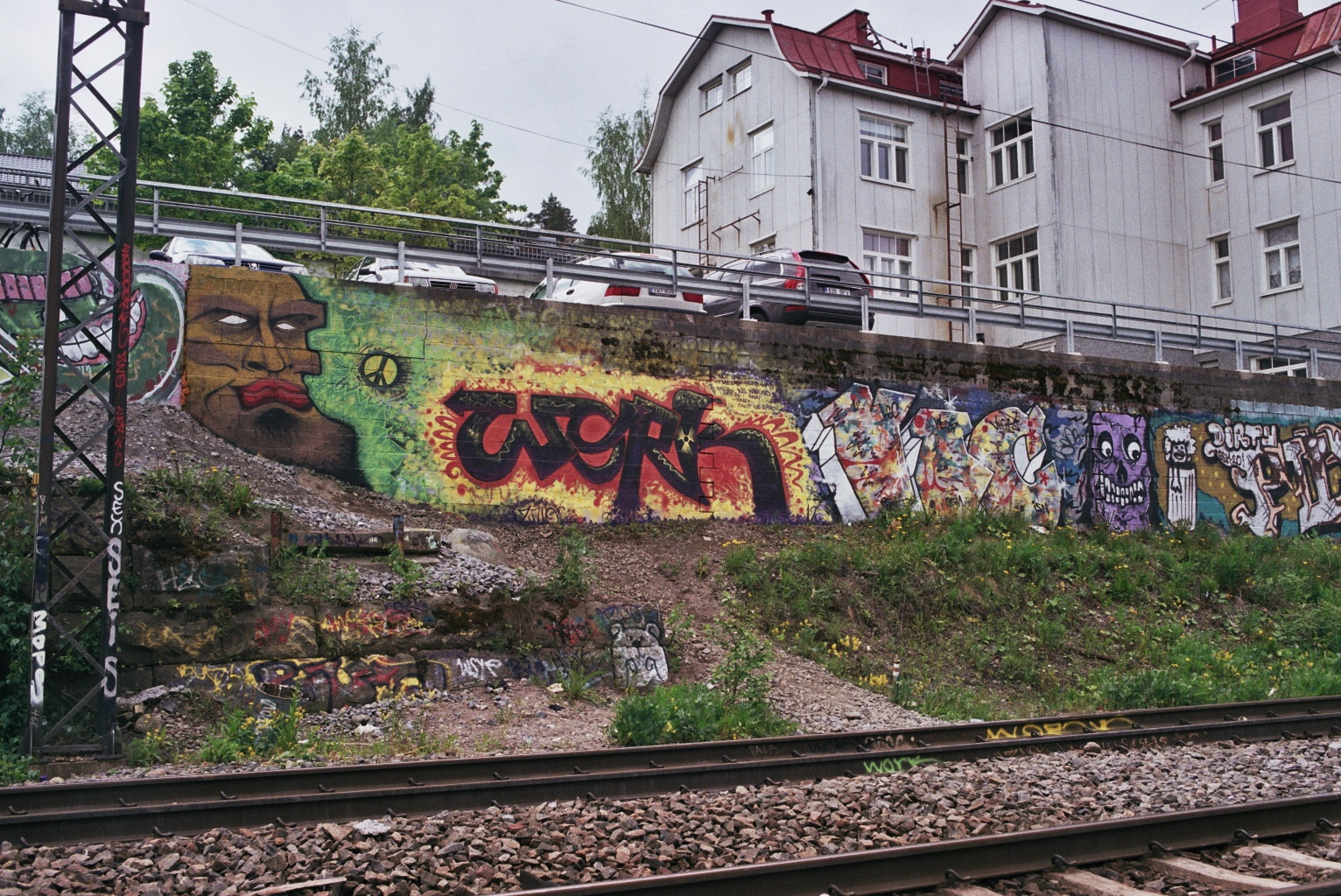
Graffiti alongside the Tampere-Seinäjoki railway in Santalahti

== See also ==
- Paasikiven–Kekkosentie
- Tampere Tunnel
