= Särkänniemi =

Amusement park in Tampere, Finland

- Previously known as Neulan huvipuisto (different park at the same location 1973-74)

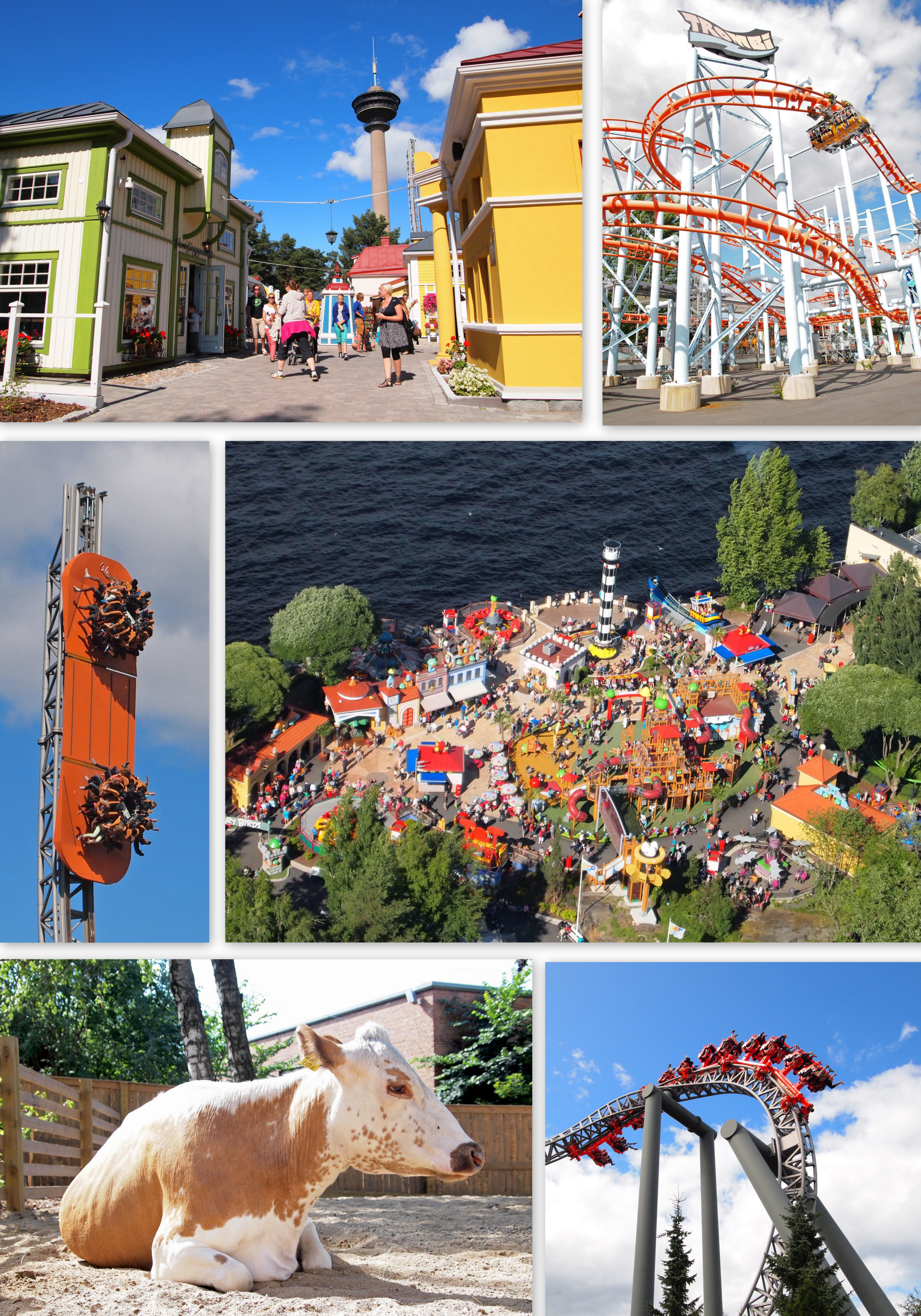
- Interactive map of Särkänniemi
- Location: Tampereen Särkänniemi Oy, 33230 Tampere, Finland
- Coordinates: 61°30′19″N 023°44′38″E
- Status: Operating
- Opened: May 1, 1975; 51 years ago
- Owner: City of Tampere
- Slogan: "Särkänniemeen, Särkänniemeen"
- Operating season: April to October (rides area) / throughout the year
- Area: 50,000 m^{2} (540,000 sq ft)

Attractions
- Total: 29
- Roller coasters: 4
- Water rides: 2
- Website: www.sarkanniemi.fi

Särkänniemi Zoo
- Interactive map of Särkänniemi Zoo
- Major exhibits: aquarium, children's zoo
- Website: https://www.sarkanniemi.fi

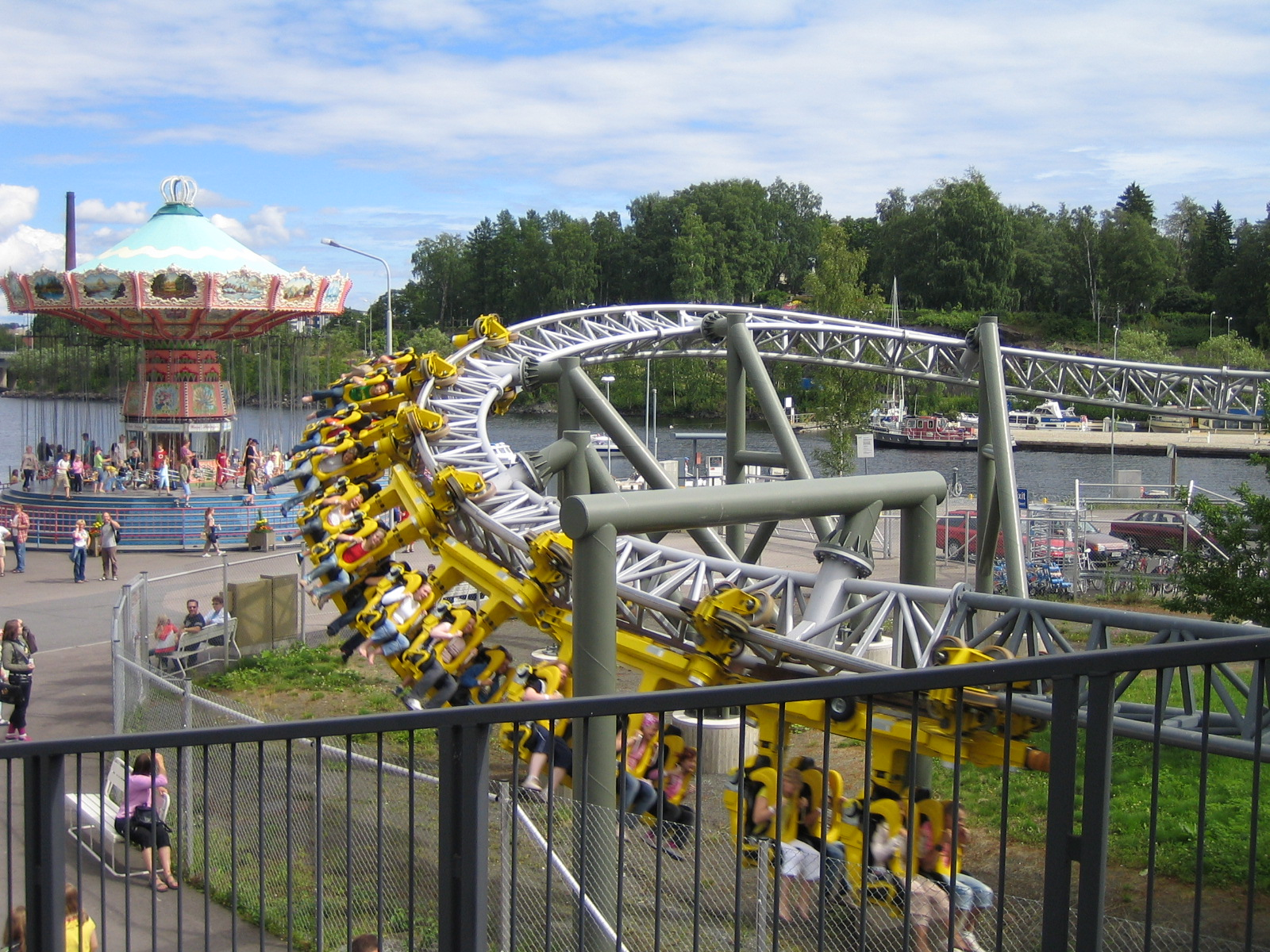
Särkänniemi in 2005

Särkänniemi (Finnish pronunciation: [ˈsærkænˌnie̯mi]; 'Cape of Sandbank') is an amusement park in Tampere, Finland, located in the district by the same name. The park features an aquarium, a planetarium, Doghill Fairytale Farm, an art museum and an observation tower Näsinneula (Näsi Needle). Särkänniemi is the second most popular amusement park in Finland with Linnanmäki in Helsinki being the most popular one. Särkänniemi has four rollercoasters: the inverted coaster Tornado, the family motorcycle launch coaster MotoGee and Hype, a launched steel Sky Rocket II coaster, and family coaster Vauhtimato ("Speedy Worm"). The half-pipe coaster called Half Pipe was recently removed due to multiple reasons. Särkänniemi is owned by the city of Tampere and attracts over 600 000 visitors annually.

Särkänniemi is the biggest rival for Linnanmäki as the lead amusement park in Finland. Both are about the same size. The park gave up the dolphinarium in 2016 and the dolphins were safely transported to Attica Zoological Park in Greece. The park has more than 30 rides and attractions. There are also two water rides in the park, a log flume called Tukkijoki and a river rapids called Koskiseikkailu. The roller coaster Trombi will be removed in autumn 2024.

In the future, a hotel and spa with restaurants and water experiences are planned around the amusement park, as well as new apartments. It is also possible to travel to the area by tram as part of the Tampere light rail network.

== History ==
This multi-purpose park is owned by the city of Tampere and boasts a variety of rides as well as both Aquarium and Planetarium was opened in 1969, a children's zoo that opened in 1970, a 168m tall Observation Tower that opened in 1971, The Sara Hilden Art Museum opened in 1979, and the Dolphinarium opened in 1985.

The amusement park aspect of Särkänniemi started in 1973 with the opening of Neulan Huvipuisto (Neula Amusement Park); in the beginning the park offered only a handful of children's rides. In 1975 the city of Tampere took over the operations of the fun park and integrated it into other attractions on the peninsula.

The park is located on a peninsula, about a kilometre from the city centre of Tampere, that juts out into the Black Gulf. The area used to house three different breweries in the 18th century onward and in the 20th century a huge warehouse serving the log industry was built on the peninsula of Särkänniemi. These buildings were demolished in the 1960s.

The park is easily accessible by bus line 2 and tramway line 3.

== Rides ==
=== Operating Coasters ===
Ride name	Type	Opened in	Manufacturer	Additional information
Hype	steel launched sit down	2017	Premier Rides	Reaches a speed of 100 km/h (62 mph) and a height of 46 m (151 ft) on a 260 m (853 ft) steel track with one full inversion (heartline twist, sky loop) and one twisted loop. Height limit 1.4 m (4 ft 7 in). Sky Rocket II model, train 1x12.
Motogee	flywheel launch sit down	2010	Zamperla	Reaches a speed of 68 km/h (42 mph) in just 2 seconds on a 364 m (1,194 ft) long track. Height limit 1.2 m (3 ft 11 in). Motocoaster model, train 2x5.
Tornado	steel inverted	2001	Intamin	Reaches a speed of 74 km/h (46 mph) and a height of 25 m (82 ft) on a 700 m (2,297 ft) long track with 5 inversions (loop, tunnel, cobra roll, heartline roll, heartline roll). Height limit 1.4 m (4 ft 7 in). Suspended looping coaster, train 2x12.
Vauhtimato (Whirley Worm)	steel sit down	1984	Zierer	Reaches a speed of 26 km/h (16 mph) and a height of 3 m (10 ft) on a 60 m (197 ft) long track. Height limit 1 m (3 ft 3 in) / 1.2 m (3 ft 11 in) alone. Small Tivoli model, train 2x5.
Konect	steel sit down	2026	Vekoma	Reaches a speed of 68 km/h (42 mph) and a height of 27 m (88 ft) on a 525 m (1,722 ft) track. Height limit 1 m (3 ft 3 in) / 1.2 m (3 ft 11 in) alone. Junior coaster model, train 2x10.

=== Defunct Coasters ===
Ride name	Type	Opened	Closed	Manufacturer	Additional information
Half Pipe	Steel	2003	2019	Intamin	Reaches a speed of 69 km/h (43 mph) and a height of 30 m (98 ft) on a 70 m (230 ft) long half pipe track. Height limit 1.4 m (4 ft 7 in). Half Pipe model, train 2x8.
Jet Star	Steel	1980	2012	Anton Schwarzkopf	Reaches a speed of 50 km/h (31 mph) and a height of 13 m (43 ft) on a 538 m (1,765 ft) track. Height limit 1.4 m (4 ft 7 in). Jet Star model, designed by Ing-Buro Stengel, car 1x4.
Korkkiruuvi (Corkscrew)	Steel	1987	2009	Vekoma	Reaches a speed of 60 km/h (37 mph) and a height of 19,5 m (64 ft) on a 365 m (1,197 ft) long track. Height limit 1,2m (3ft 11in). It was the first roller coaster in Finland to include an inversion. Corkscrew model by Vekoma. 7x2x2.
Trombi	Steel flying	2005	2023	Zamperla	Reaches a speed of 40 km/h (25 mph) and a height of 15 m (49 ft) on a 391 m (1,283 ft) long track with 2 inversions (heartline roll, heartline roll). Height limit 1.4 m (4 ft 7 in). Spiral lift Volare model, car 4x1.

=== Flat rides ===
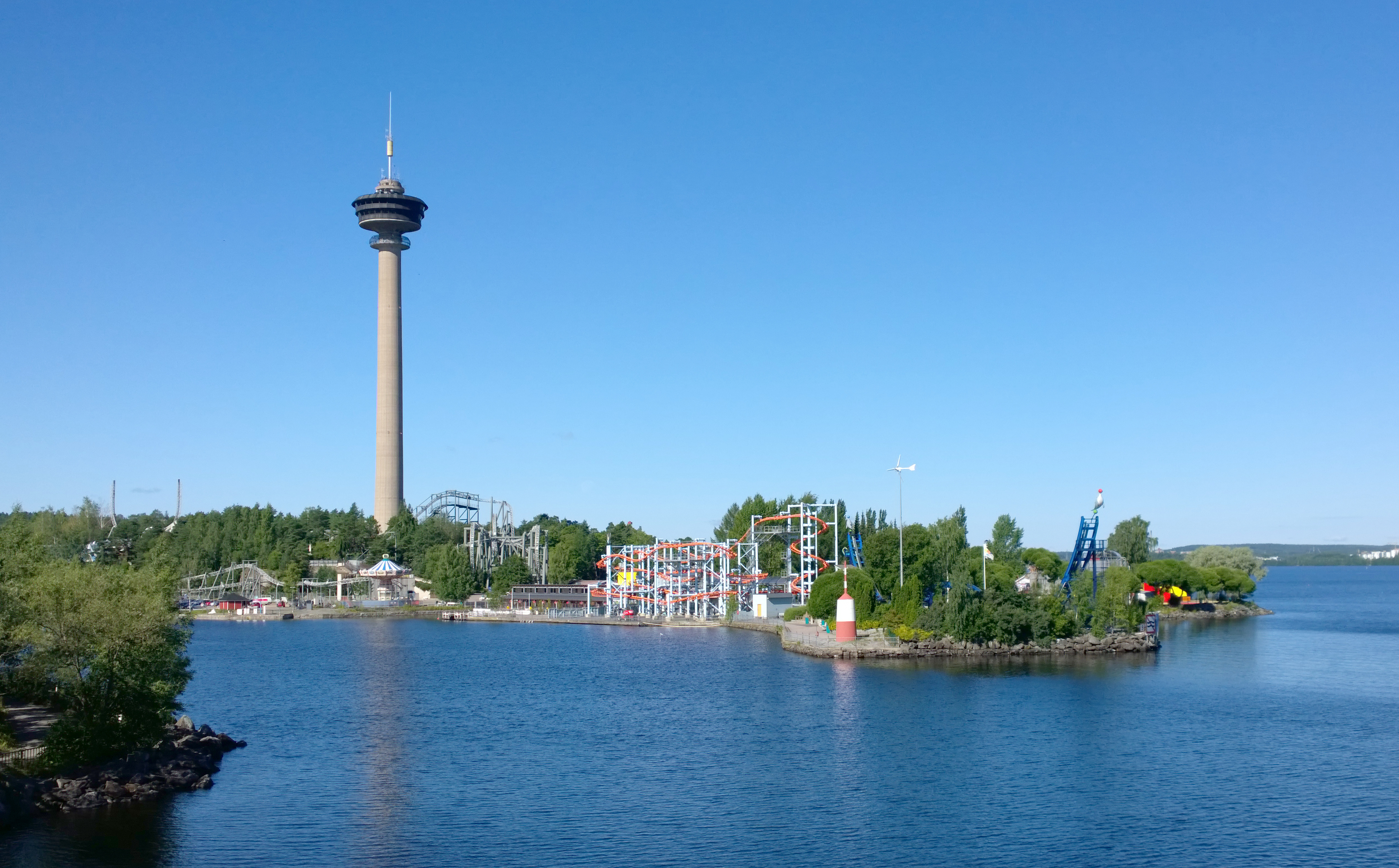
Särkänniemi seen from Näsinsilta bridge

- X – Giant Discovery Revolution rotating 360° pendulum ride that opened in 2016; height limit 1.4m. Zamperla.
- High Voltage – Power Surge, high-impact thrill ride that opened in 2014; height limit is 1.3m. Zamperla.
- Tyrsky – Disk'O Coaster that opened in 2009; height limit 1.2m. Zamperla.
- Take Off – Breakdance spinner that opened in 2006; height limit 1.3m. Huss.
- BOOM – Zamperla Z-Max drop tower that opened in 2019; height limit 1.4m. Zamperla.

=== Water rides ===
- Koskiseikkailu – this Rapids Adventure ride was opened in 1999. Intamin; a 6-passenger boat journeys a 490 meters course with a tunnel and a waterfall.
- Tukkijoki – a log flume ride that opened in 1982. Reverchon, Tamperer; a 400 meter long course with 3 drops, the highest of which is 13 m tall.

=== Other rides ===
- Auto Racing – bumper cars that opened in 1986. Reverchon.
- Lake Carousel – swing ride that opened in 1996. Gerstlauer.
- Troika – troika spinner ride that opened in 1975; height limit 1m. Huss.
- Viking Ship – swinging Viking ship that opened in 1988. Zierer.
- Swing Carousel – Carousel that opened in 2018. Preston & Barbieri.

=== Kiddie rides ===
- Piggy Town's playground – play area that opened in 2012 and renew 2023.
- Hopping Carrots – Zamperla jump around that opened in 2012 and renew 2023.
- Candy Carousel – merry go round that opened in 1993. Bertazzon.
- Coffee Cups – spinning cups for kids only. Soriani&Moser.
- Convoy Truck Race – convoy trucks for kids only. Cosetto.
- Crazy Bus – crazy bus ride. Zamperla.
- Lady Bird – roundabout. Modern Products.
- Bublebee – mini roundabout for young kids only. Modern Products.
- Bat Delivery – bike ride that opened in 2008. Zamperla.
- Merry Mail Adventure – on track cars that opened in 1981. Ihle.
- Piggy Train – mini train for kids only that opened in 1994. Zamperla.
- Airplanes – airplanes. Soriani & Moser.
- Candy Boat – boat ride that opened in 2004. Zamperla.
- Lighthouse – tower ride that opened in 2012. Zamperla.

== Other attractions ==
- The Aquarium at Särkänniemi was opened in 1969. It has a total combined aquarium volume of 550,000 litres (150,000 US gal), and is home to more than 3,000 animals representing 200 species. The lower floor of the aquarium includes a mangrove swamp habitat that is home to monos, archer fish, gourami fish, rainbow sharks and blowfish.
- Doghill Fairytale Farm is petting zoo that opened in 2013.
- Näsinneula Observation Tower that opened in 1971 is 168 meters tall and it has a restaurant on the top floor.
- Piggy Town is Pouta Pig's hometown that opened in 2023.
- Sara Hilden Art Museum opened in 1979 and has on display works from mostly contemporary Finnish artists.
- Creepy Carnival is a horror-themed festival held annually in autumn.
