= Paasikiven–Kekkosentie =

Road in Tampere, Finland

Coordinates: 61°30′06.71767″N 23°43′47.16336″E

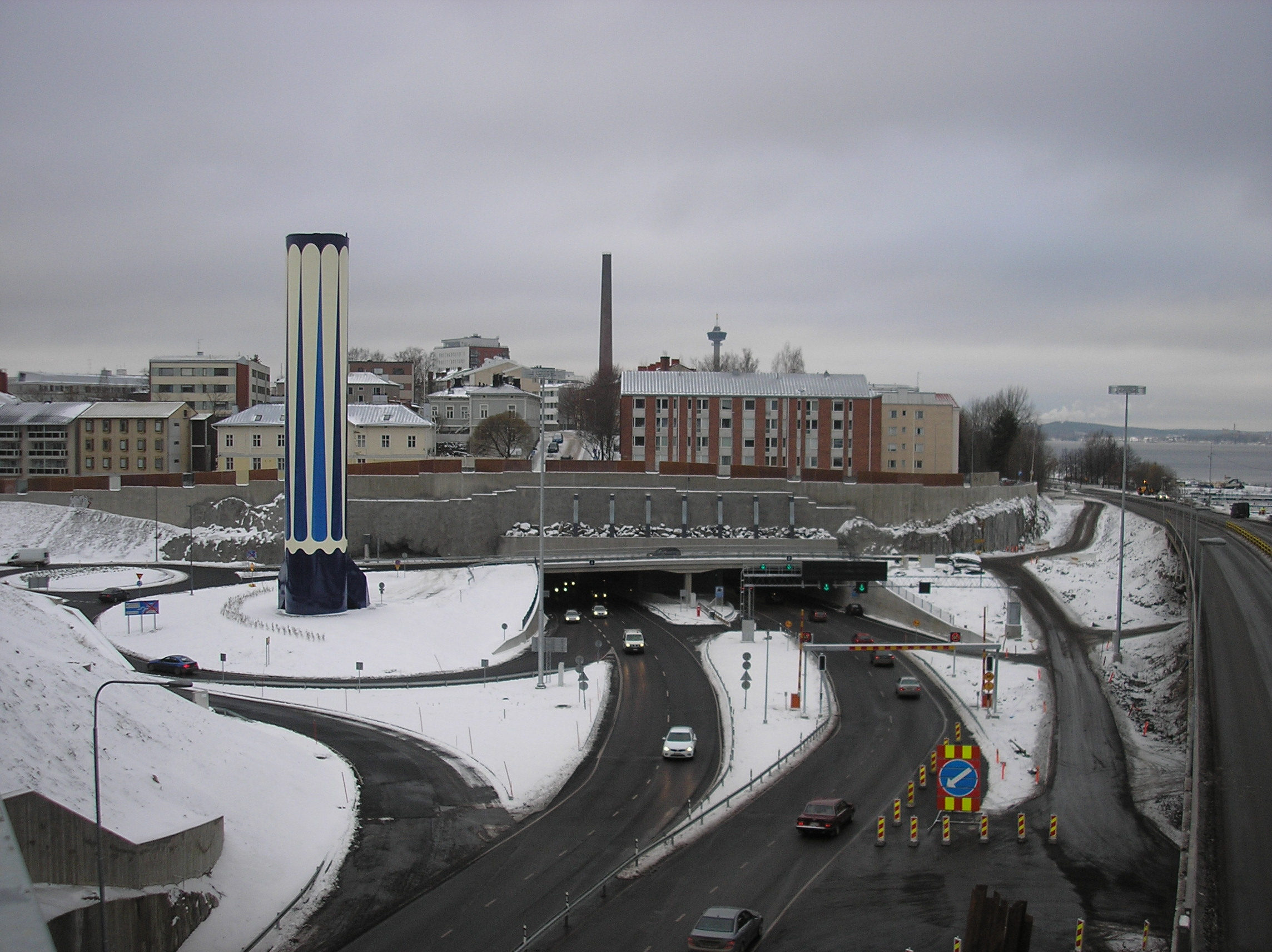
The eastern entrance of the Rantatunneli traffic tunnel along Paasikiven–Kekkosentie, diving under the city centre of Tampere, on November 15, 2016.

Paasikiven–Kekkosentie ("Paasikivi–Kekkonen Road"), or Rantaväylä, is a busy car traffic route located in Tampere, Finland, which serves as a regional transit road and a significant access route to the city center. It is a four-lane highway owned by the Finnish state and part of Highway 12. Paasikiven–Kekkosentie is located between the Nokia's motorway and the Teiskontie street junction.

The originally Paasikiven–Kekkosentie was seven kilometers long and was built in several phases. The first part was completed on the southern shore of Lake Näsijärvi and north of Tampere's city center in the mid-1970s. The last part at the Petsamo district was opened to traffic in 1989. At the planning stage, the highway was called Kehätie ("Ring Road"), but later the western part was named Paasikiventie and the eastern part Kekkosentie in the town plan. Paasikiventie changed to Kekkosentie on the shore of Tammerkoski at the eastern end of the Näsinsilta bridge.

The name Paasikiventie refers to President J. K. Paasikivi, who lived in Tampere as an early child. When the street name was entered in the town plan in the early 1970s, one hundred years had passed since Paasikivi was born. The name Kekkosentie, which was included in the town plan in 1977, is intended to honor President Urho Kekkonen, who had connections to Tampere through businessman Kalle Kaihari. At the time of the completion of Paasikiven–Kekkosentie, the so-called Paasikivi–Kekkonen doctrine prevailed in Finnish foreign policy.

Paasikiventie and Kekkosentie were originally streets managed and operated by the city, but in the mid-1990s they were converted into state-maintained public roads. The road section between Mustanlahti and Naistenlahti was widened in 1997. Completed in 2016, the Tampere Tunnel, which is a couple of kilometers long, changed the alignment of the fairway so that Paasikiventie is now located on the west side of the tunnel (west of Santalahti) and Kekkosentie on the east side of the tunnel (east of Naistenlahti). The tunnel section is not Paasikiventie or Kekkosentie, but the name of the underground road is Rantatunneli. With the tunnel, the above-ground road section between Santalahti and Naistenlahti became obsolete from Highway 12, and was renamed Paasikivenkatu–Kekkosenkatu. The word katu (translated "street") tells that the responsibility for maintaining the road lies with the city of Tampere.

== See also ==
- Mannerheimintie
