= Näsinneula =

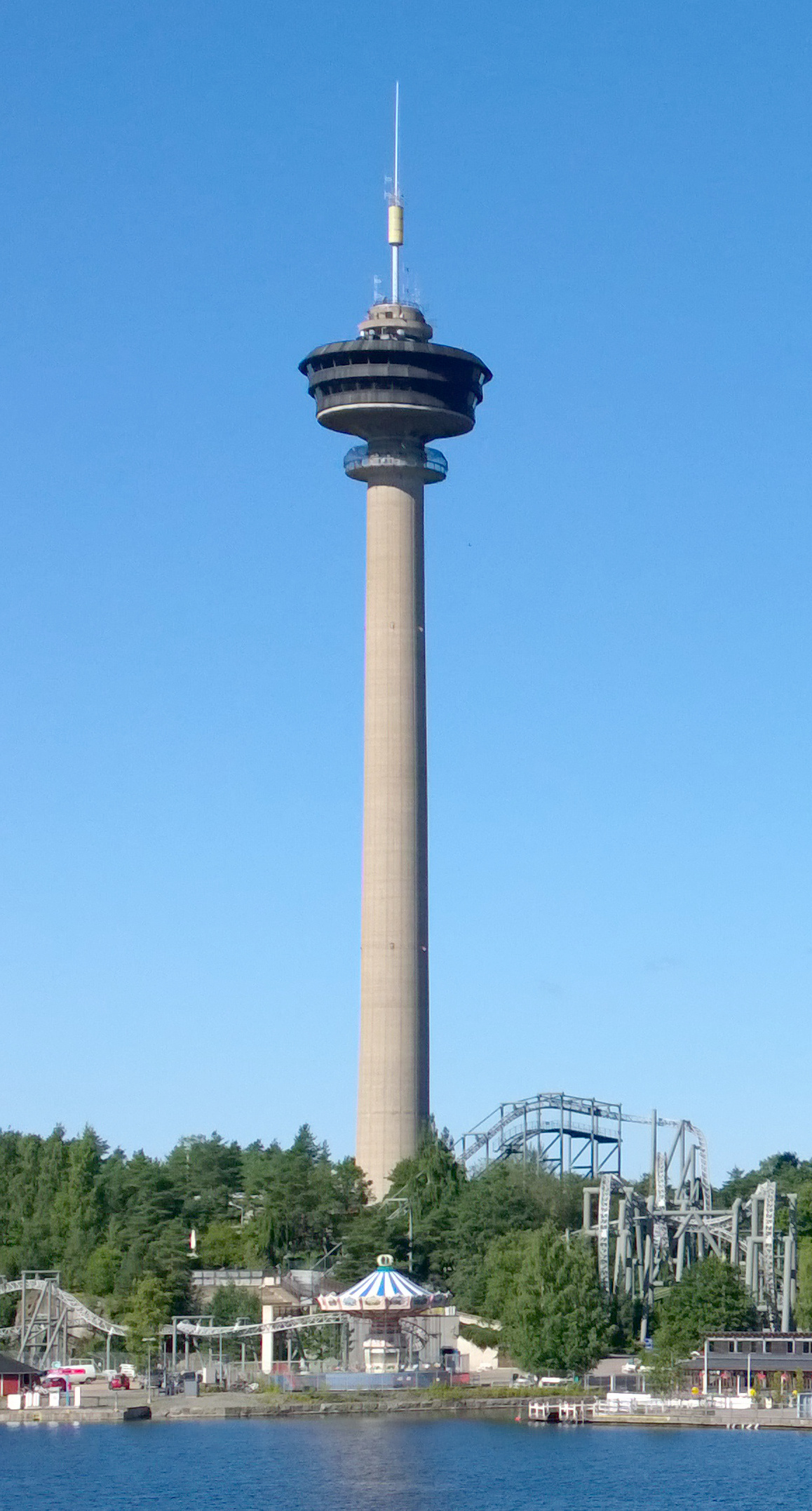
- Näsinneula in August 2015
- Interactive map of the Näsinneula area

General information
- Type: Observation, communication, restaurant
- Location: Särkänniemi, Tampere, Finland
- Coordinates: 61°30′18″N 023°44′36″E
- Construction started: 1970
- Completed: 1971
- Opening: 28 April 1971

Height
- Antenna spire: 167.9 m (550.9 ft)
- Roof: 138 m (452.8 ft)
- Top floor: 134.0 m (439.6 ft)

Technical details
- Floor count: 2
- Lifts/elevators: 2

Design and construction
- Architect: Pekka Ilveskoski

Näsinneula (Finnish: [ˈnæsinˌneu̯lɑ]; lit. 'the Needle of Näsi') is an observation tower in Tampere, Finland, overseeing Lake Näsijärvi. It was built in 1970–1971 and was designed by Pekka Ilveskoski. It is the tallest free-standing structure in Finland and at present the tallest observation tower in the Nordic countries at a height of 168 metres (551 ft). The tower opened in 1971 and is located in the Särkänniemi amusement park. There is a revolving restaurant in the tower 124 metres (407 ft) above the ground; one revolution takes 45 minutes. The design of Näsinneula was inspired by the Space Needle in Seattle. The idea of a revolving restaurant was taken from the Puijo Tower, which is located in Kuopio, the city of North Savo.

The base of the tower is at about 15 metres (49 ft) of elevation from lake Näsijärvi. There are two elevators, which were changed to new Kone elevators in 2020. Before the update the elevators were manufactured by Valmet-Schliren. The elevators go up to a height of 120 metres (390 ft), to the Pilvilinna ("Cloud Castle") café. The restaurant (called Näsinneula) is one story higher.

The elevator ride to the top takes 27 seconds with a maximum speed of 6 m/s (20 ft/s) and the elevators carry a maximum of 16 people. The elevators are still the fastest public elevators in Finland. In the event of a blackout, the tower's own diesel emergency generator will start. In an emergency, people can be evacuated with stairs that have 700 steps.

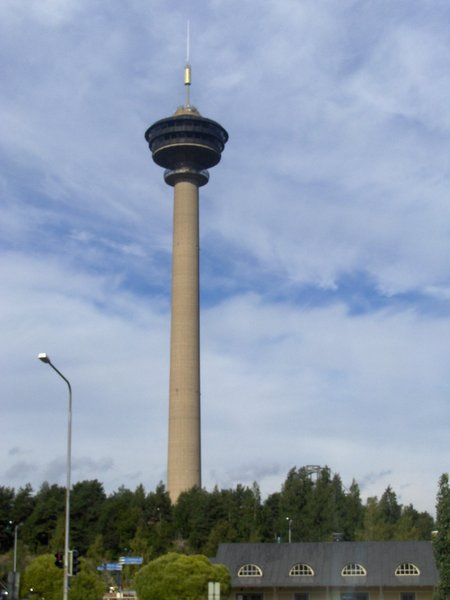
The tower in 2012

Beacon lights at the top of the tower display a weather forecast:

three yellow bars	= clear weather
two yellow and one dark green bar	= cloudy
one yellow and two dark green bars	= chance of rain
three dark green bars	= rainy

== Gallery ==
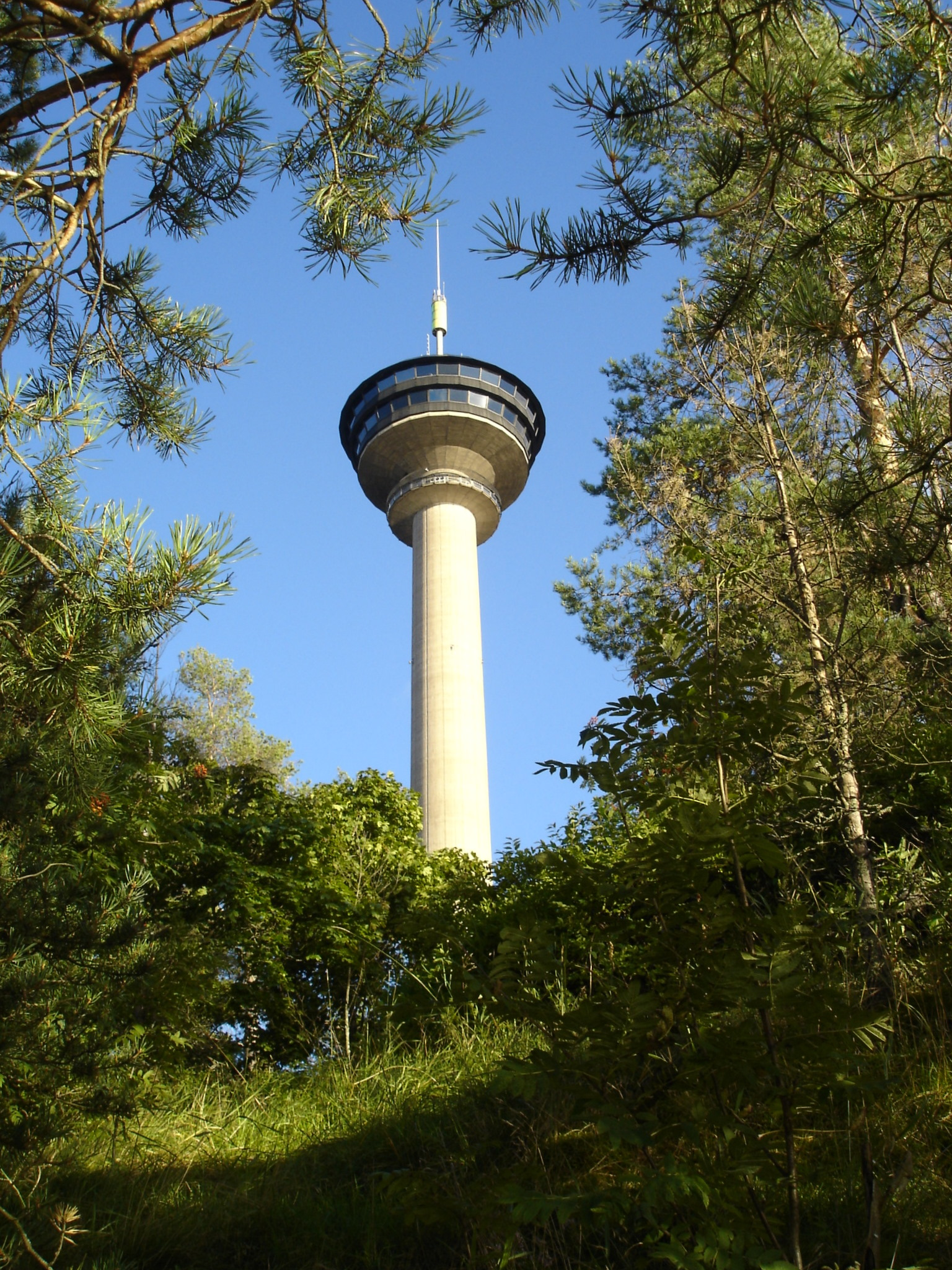
Näsinneula – tower on the shore of Näsijärvi in Tampere, 21 August 2005

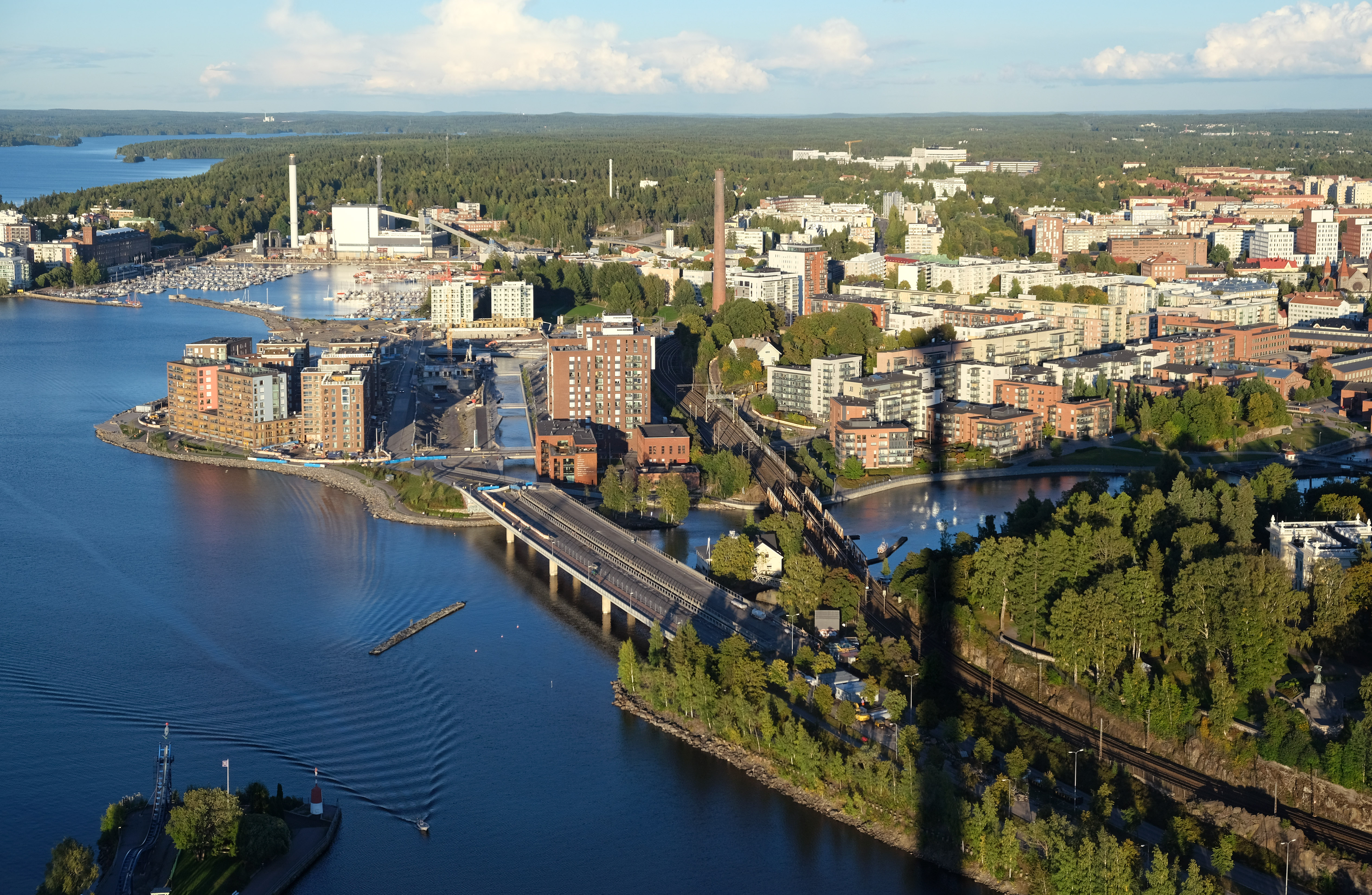
A view of the city of Tampere from Näsinneula, September 2020

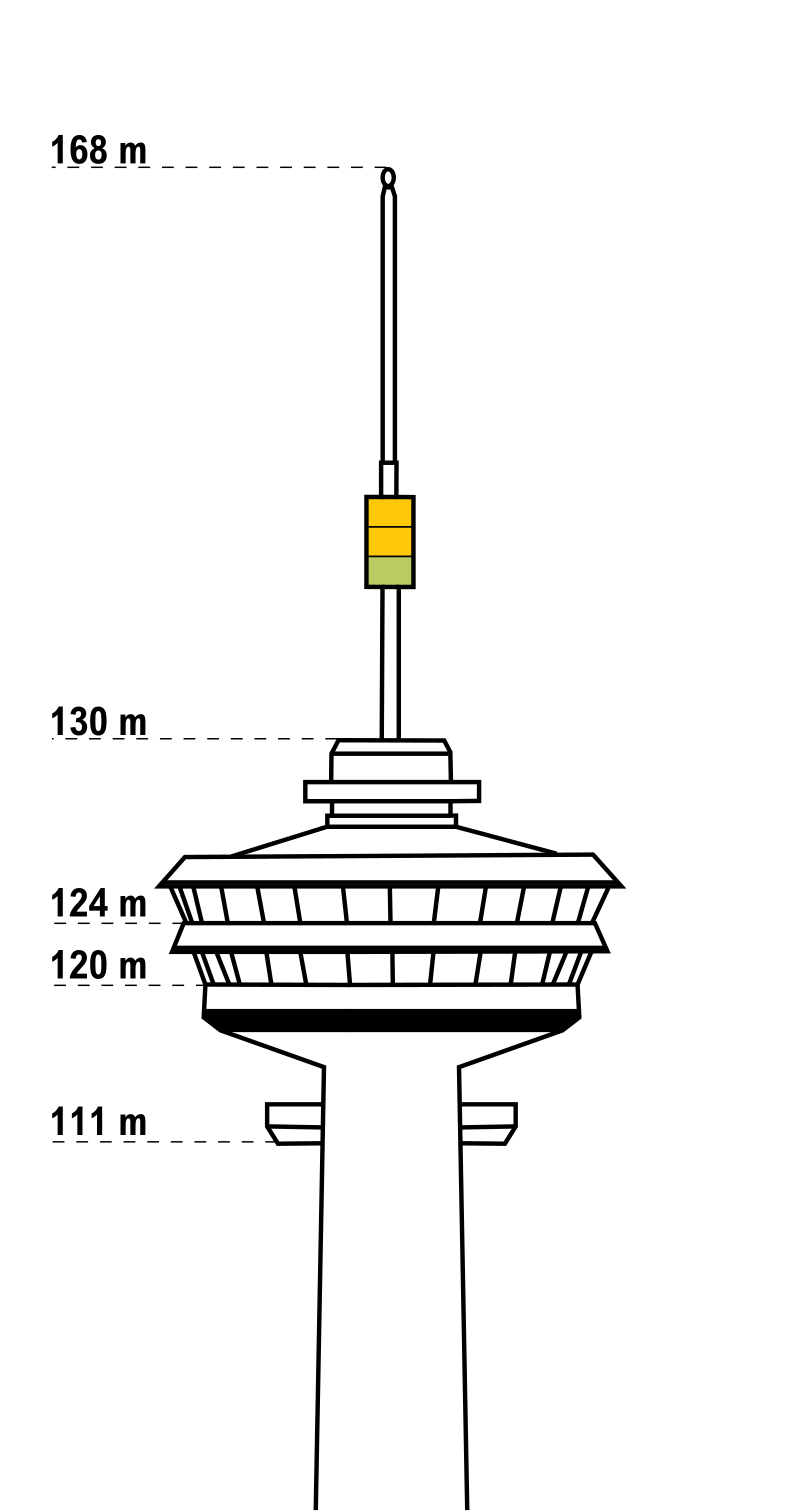
Drawing of the tower top

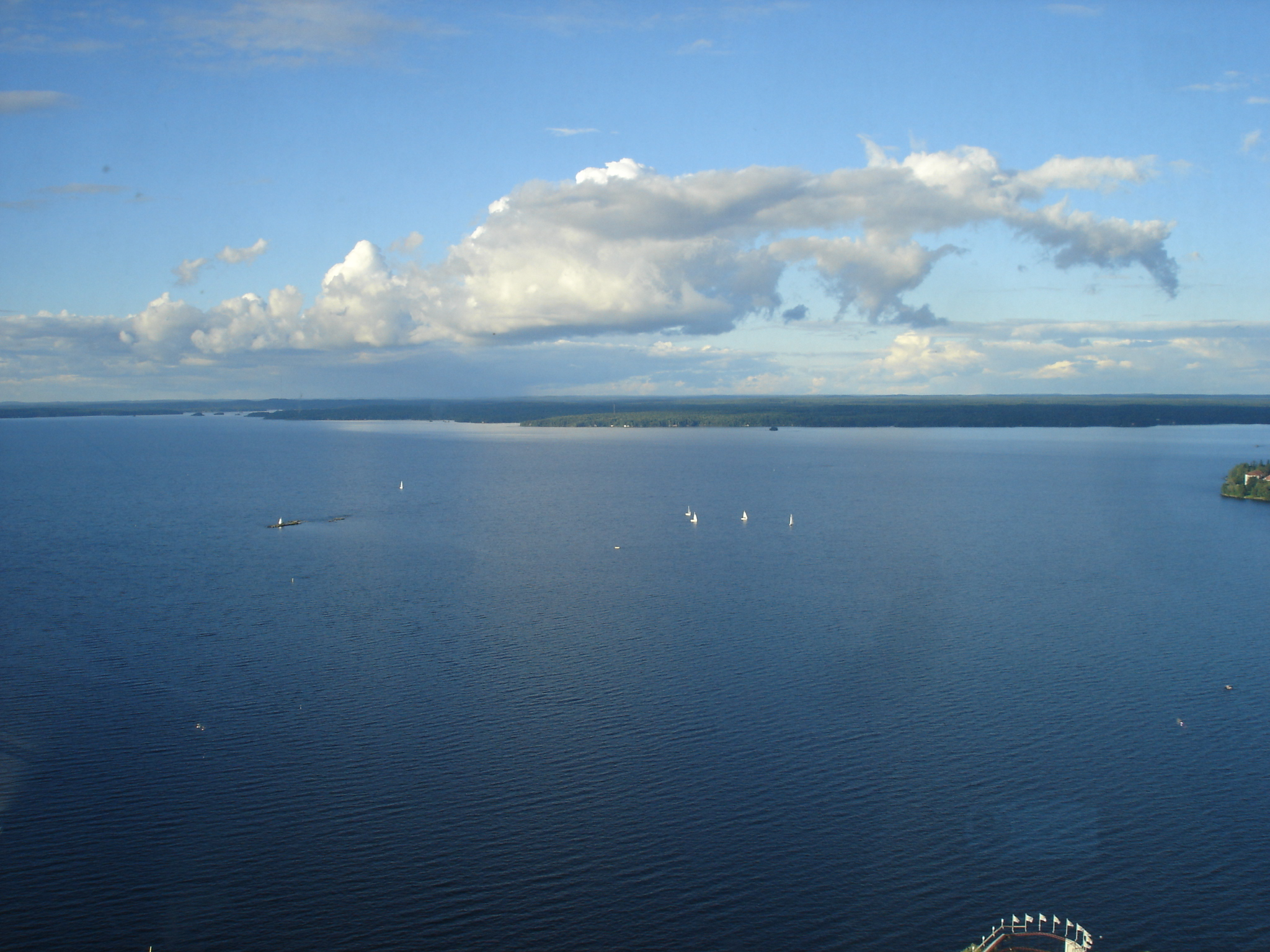
Näsijärvi lake seen from the Näsinneula tower in Tampere, 21 August 2005

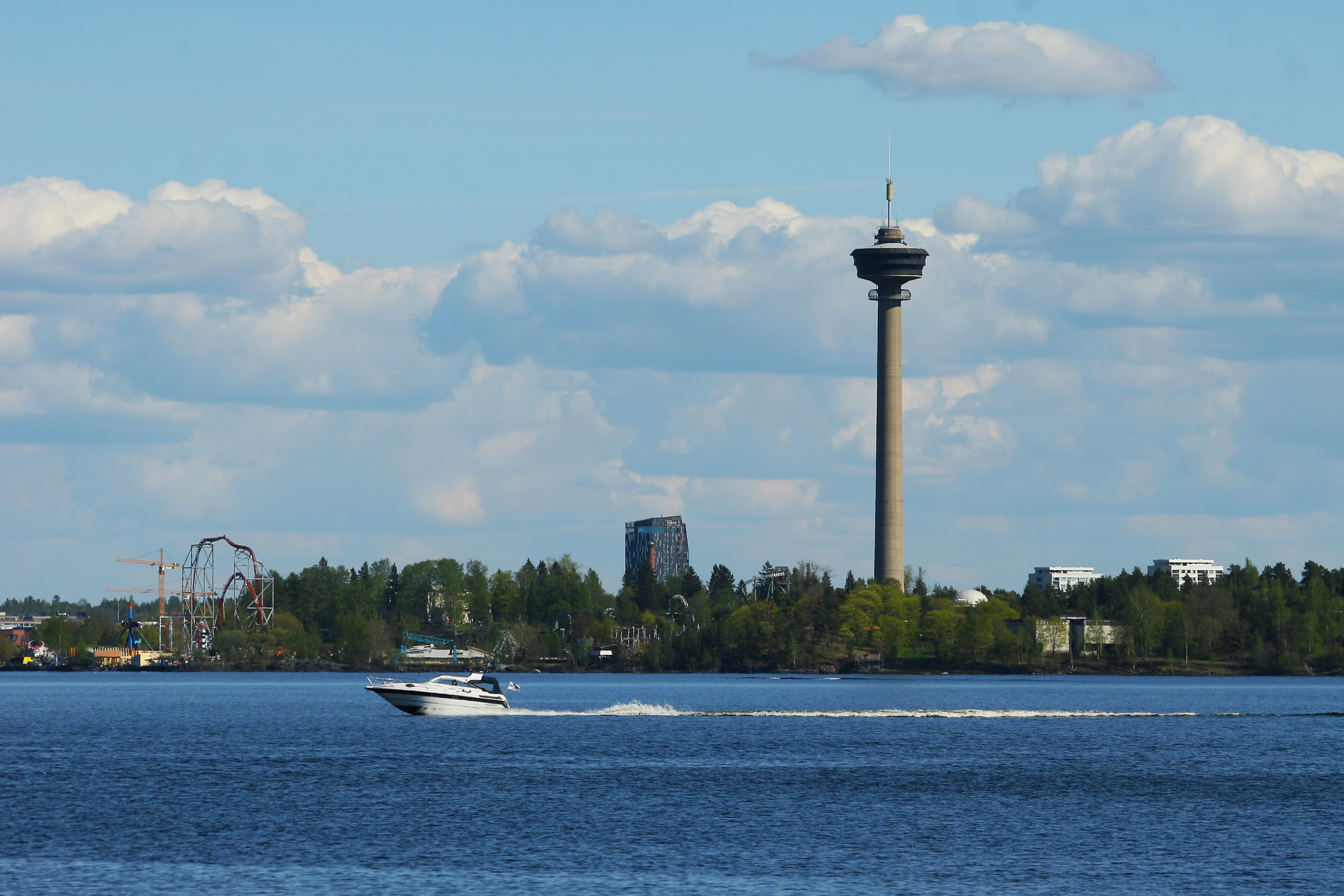
Näsinneula as seen from Lentävänniemi across Näsijärvi. Hotel Torni is visible in the background.

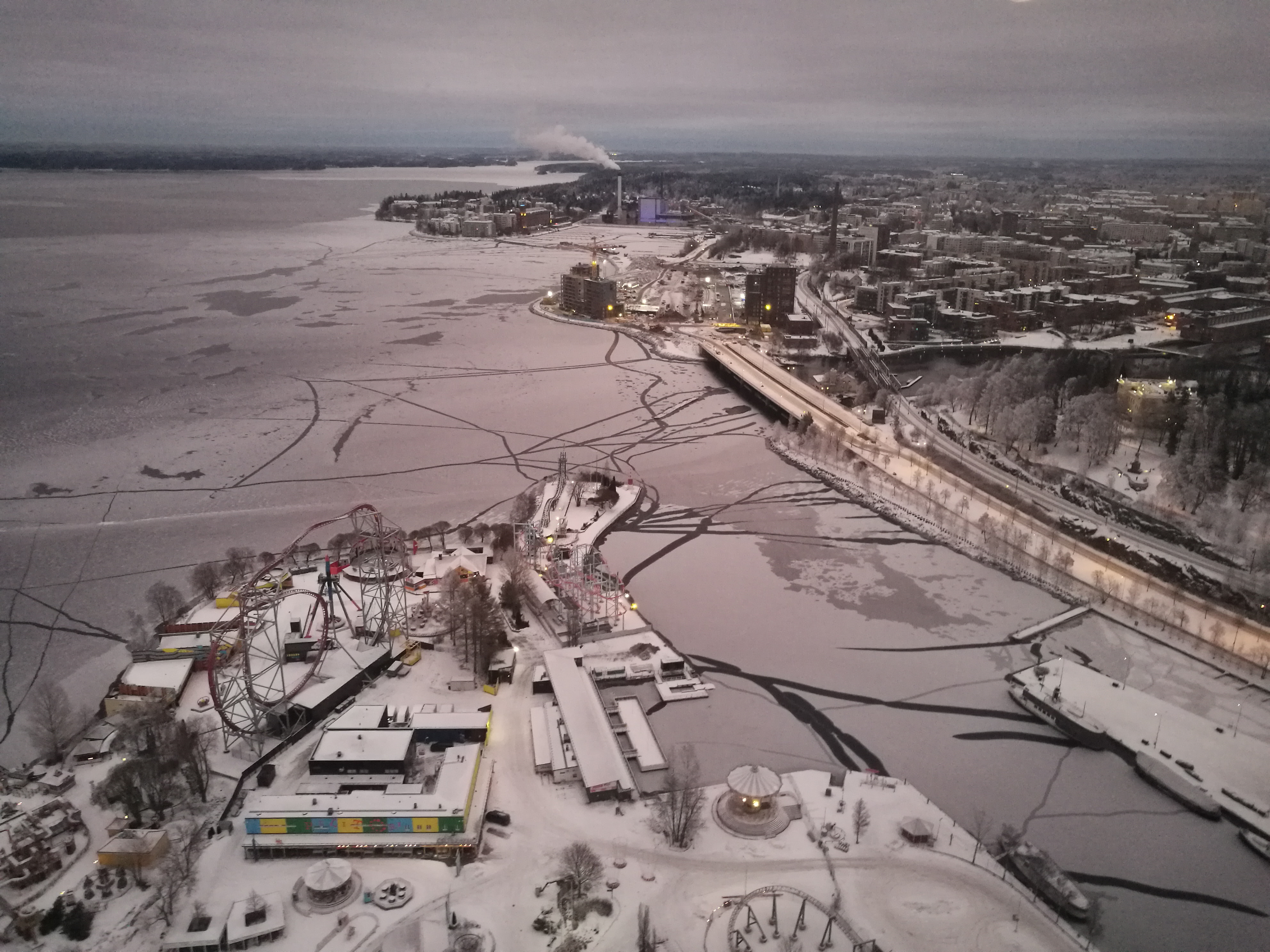
A winter view of northern Tampere and Näsijärvi lake from the tower

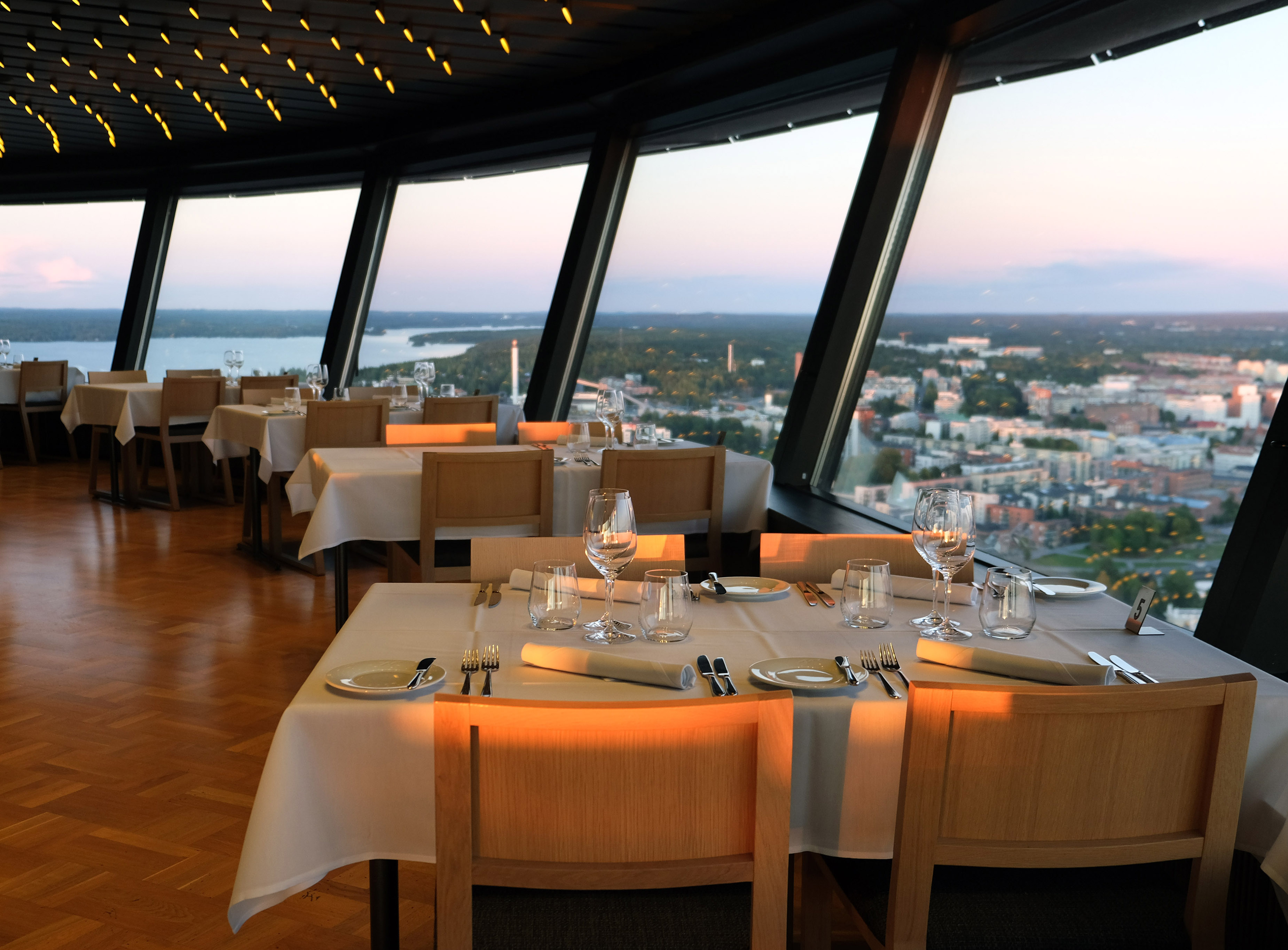
Restaurant Näsinneula

== See also ==
- Näsilinna
