= Tampere Tunnel =

Road tunnel in Tampere, Finland

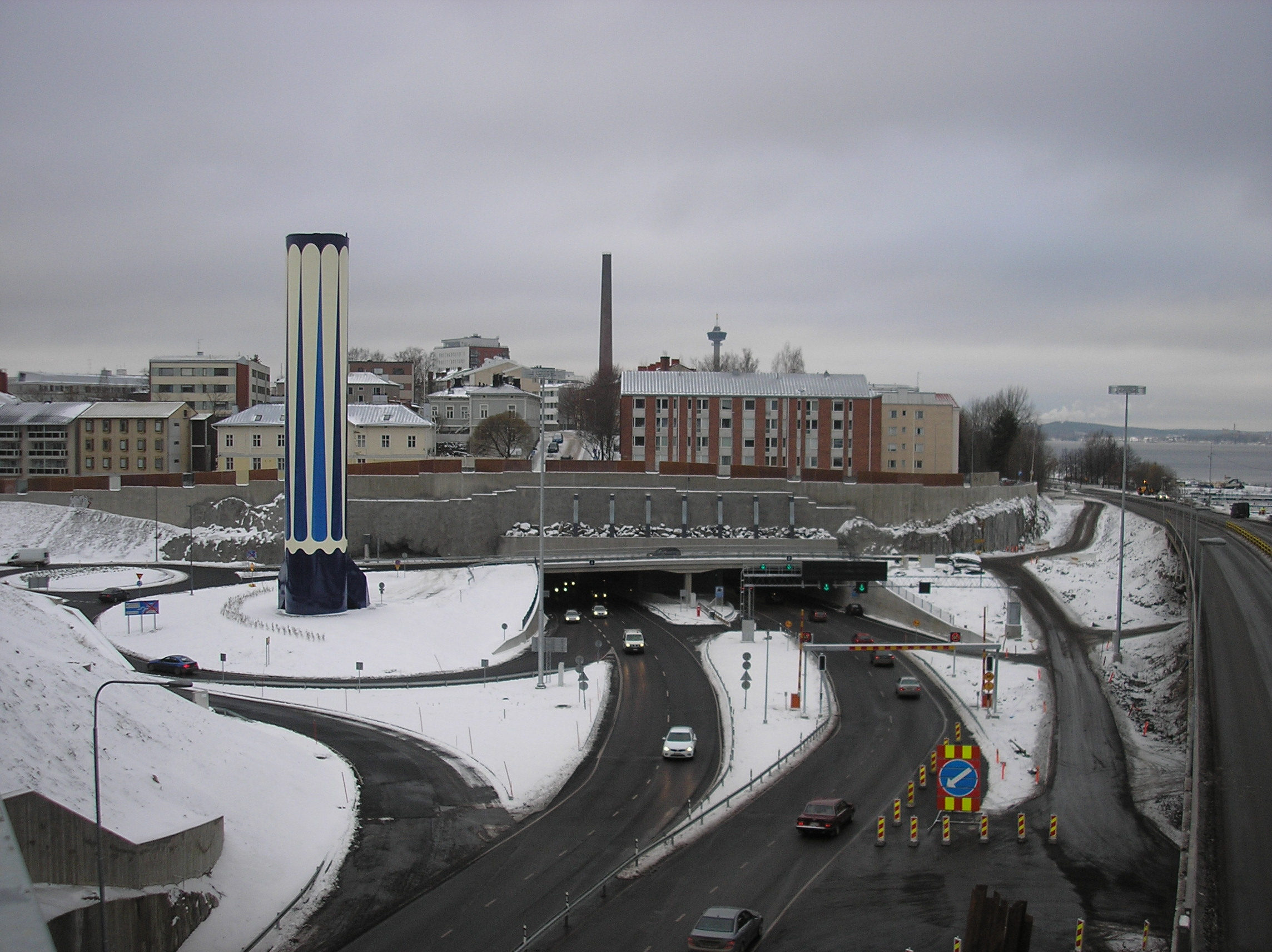
- The east entrance of the tunnel in Naistenlahti
- Interactive map of Tampere Tunnel

Overview
- Location: Tampere, Finland
- Coordinates: 61.5017°N 23.7319°E
- Route: Finnish national road 12
- Start: Santalahti
- End: Naistenlahti

Operation
- Opened: 15 November 2016; 9 years ago
- Owner: Finnish Transport Agency, City of Tampere
- Traffic: Automotive

Technical
- Length: 2.327 km (1.45 mi)
- No. of lanes: 4
- Operating speed: 60 kilometres per hour (37 mph)

The Tampere Tunnel (also the Rantaväylä Tunnel, Finnish: Rantaväylän tunneli) is a 2.3 kilometre-long road tunnel in Tampere, Finland. It was opened 15 November 2016, six months before scheduled. The Tampere Tunnel is the longest road tunnel in Finland. It is part of Highway 12, which passes north of Tampere city center. 36,000 vehicles a day drive through the tunnel.

== See also ==
- Paasikiven–Kekkosentie

== Sources ==
- Welcome to the Tunnel! Finnish Transport Agency.
