= Finnish national road 12 =

Road in Finland

National Road 12
- Valtatie 12 (Finnish); Riksväg 12 (Swedish)
- Valtatie 12, Riksväg 12
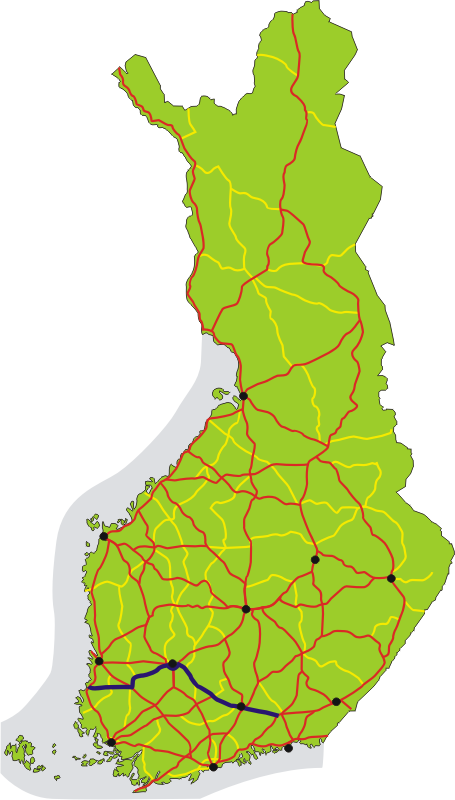

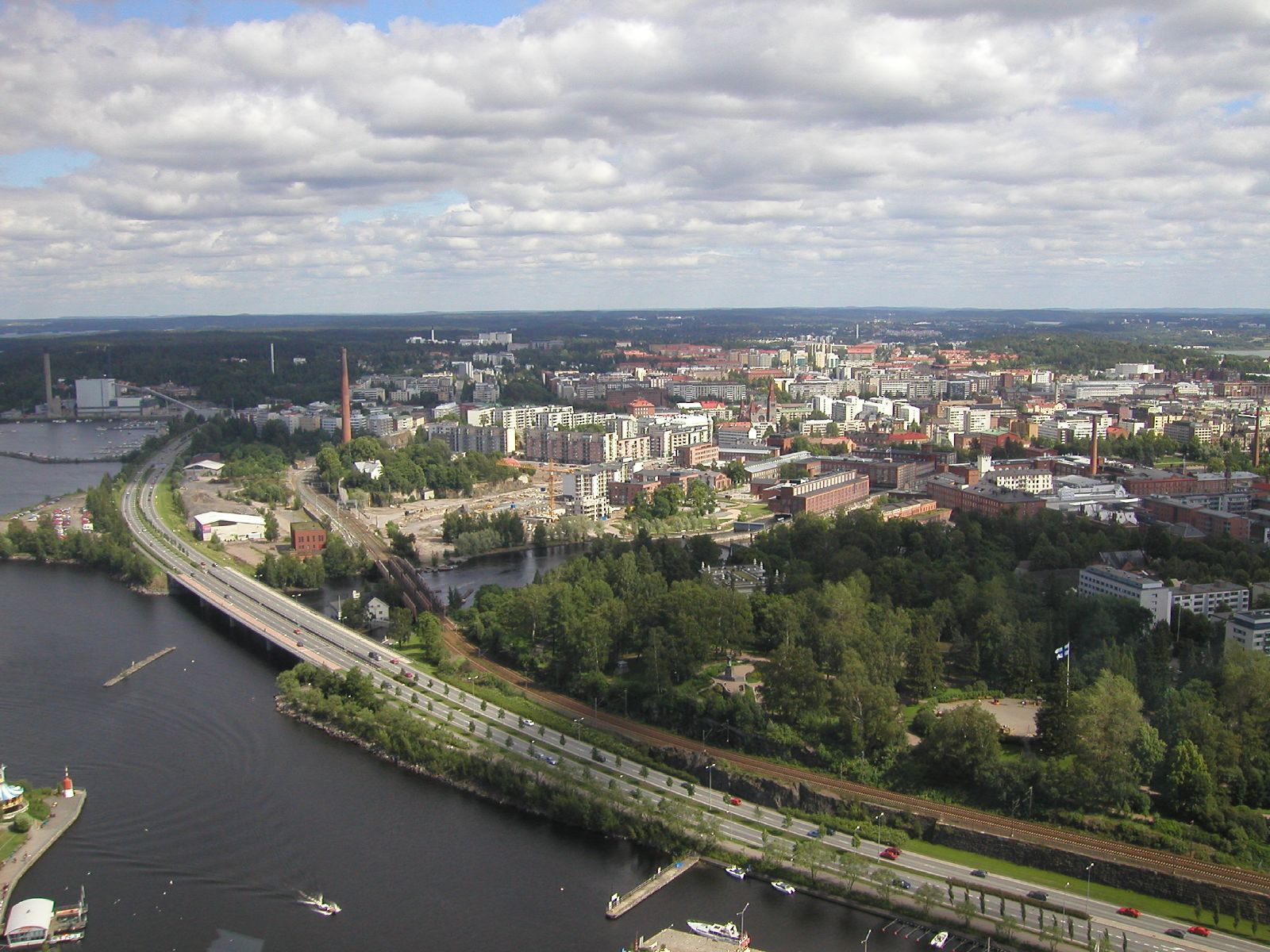

Route information
- Maintained by the Finnish Road Administration
- Length: 339 km (211 mi)

Major junctions
- From: Rauma
- To: Kouvola

Location
- Country: Finland
- Major cities: Tampere, Lahti

Highway system
- Highways in Finland

Finnish national road 12 (Finnish: Valtatie 12; Swedish: Riksväg 12) is a highway in Finland between Rauma and Kouvola via Huittinen, Tampere and Lahti. The road is 339 kilometres (211 mi) long. It is known as Teiskontie to the east of the Tampere urban area.

== Route ==
The route of the road is: Rauma – Eura – Köyliö – Kokemäki – Huittinen – Sastamala – Nokia – Tampere – Kangasala – Pälkäne – Hämeenlinna – Hämeenkoski – Hollola – Lahti – Nastola – Orimattila – Nastola (again) – Iitti – Kouvola.

== Gallery ==
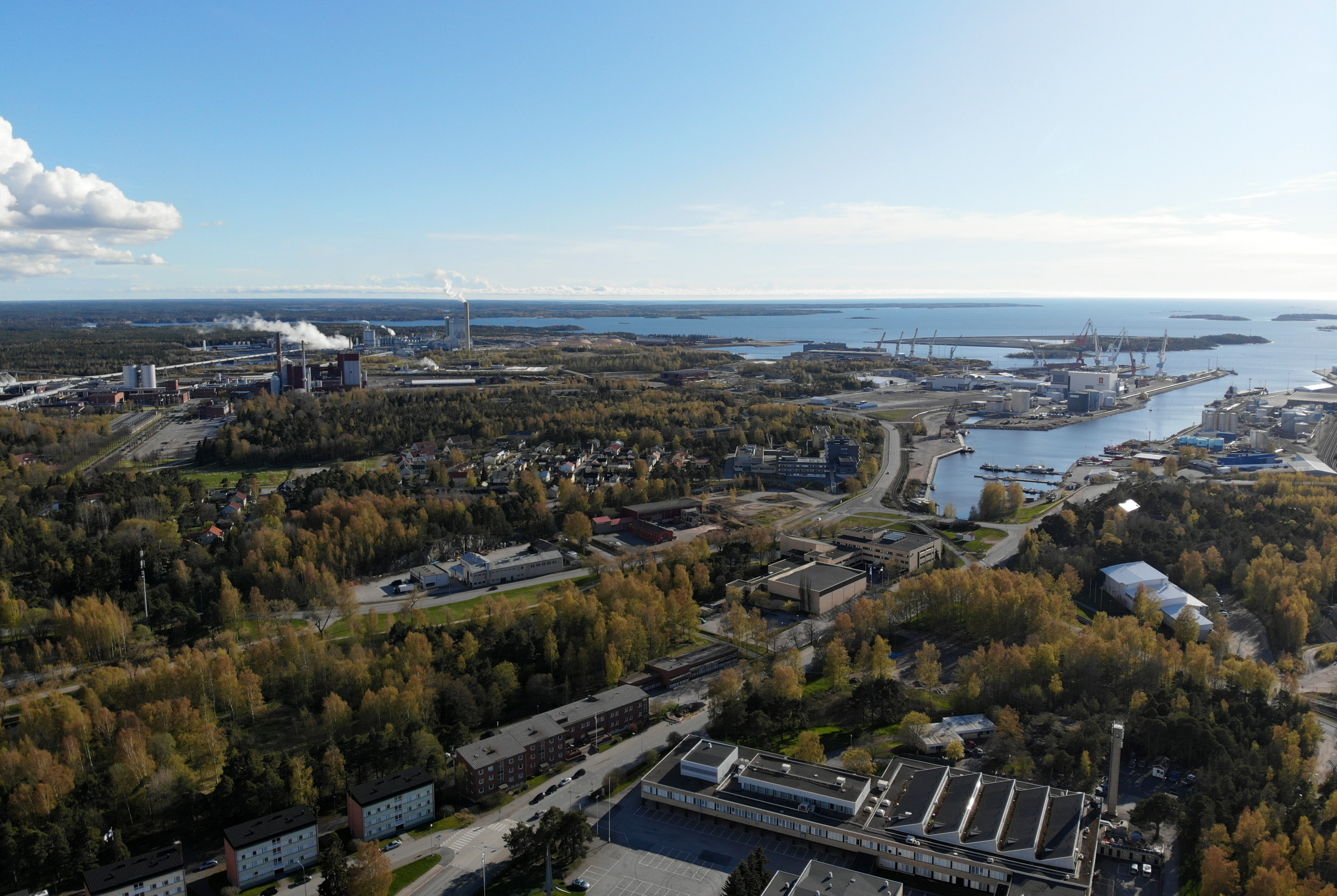
National road 12 starts at the Port of Rauma

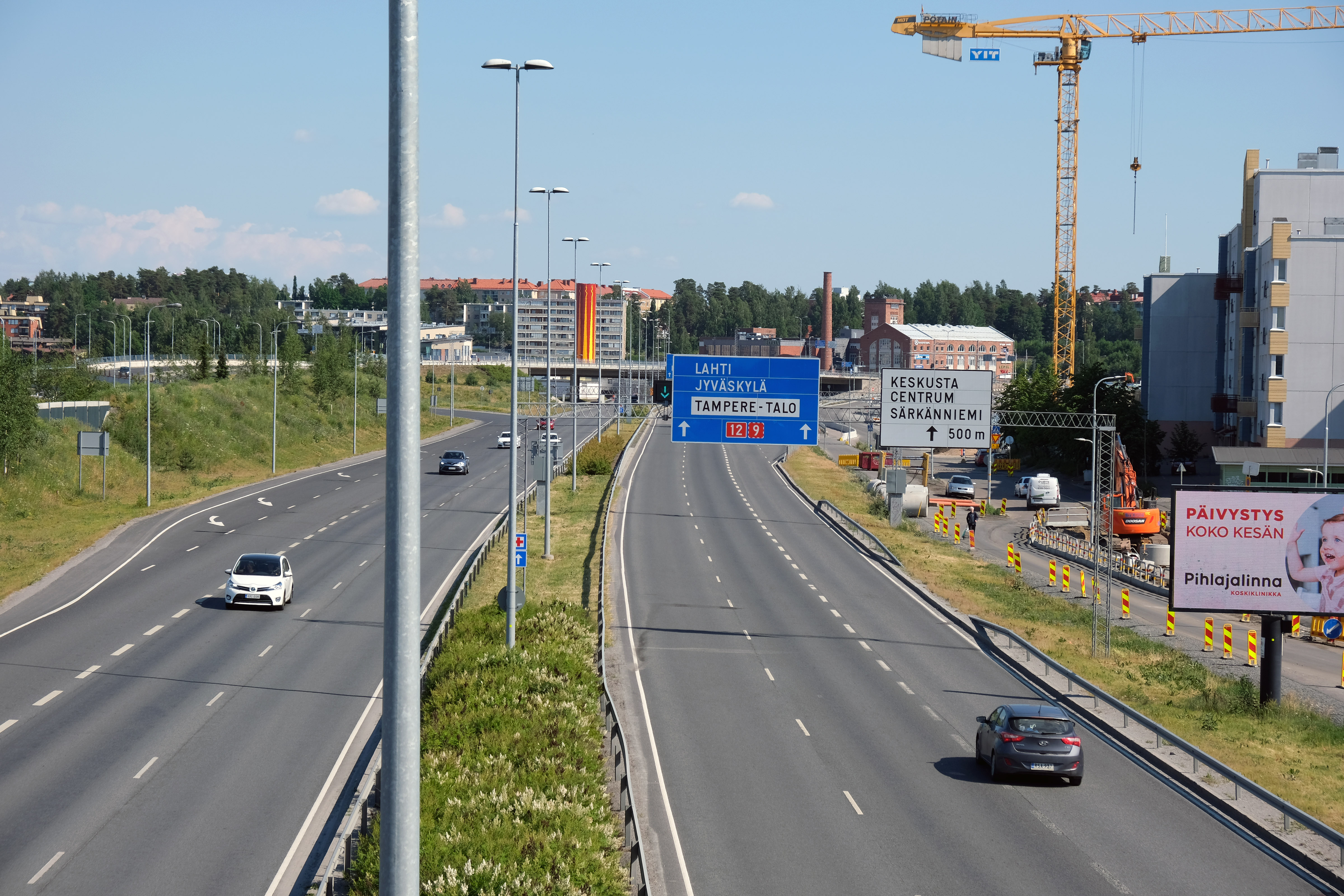
National road 12 in Tampere

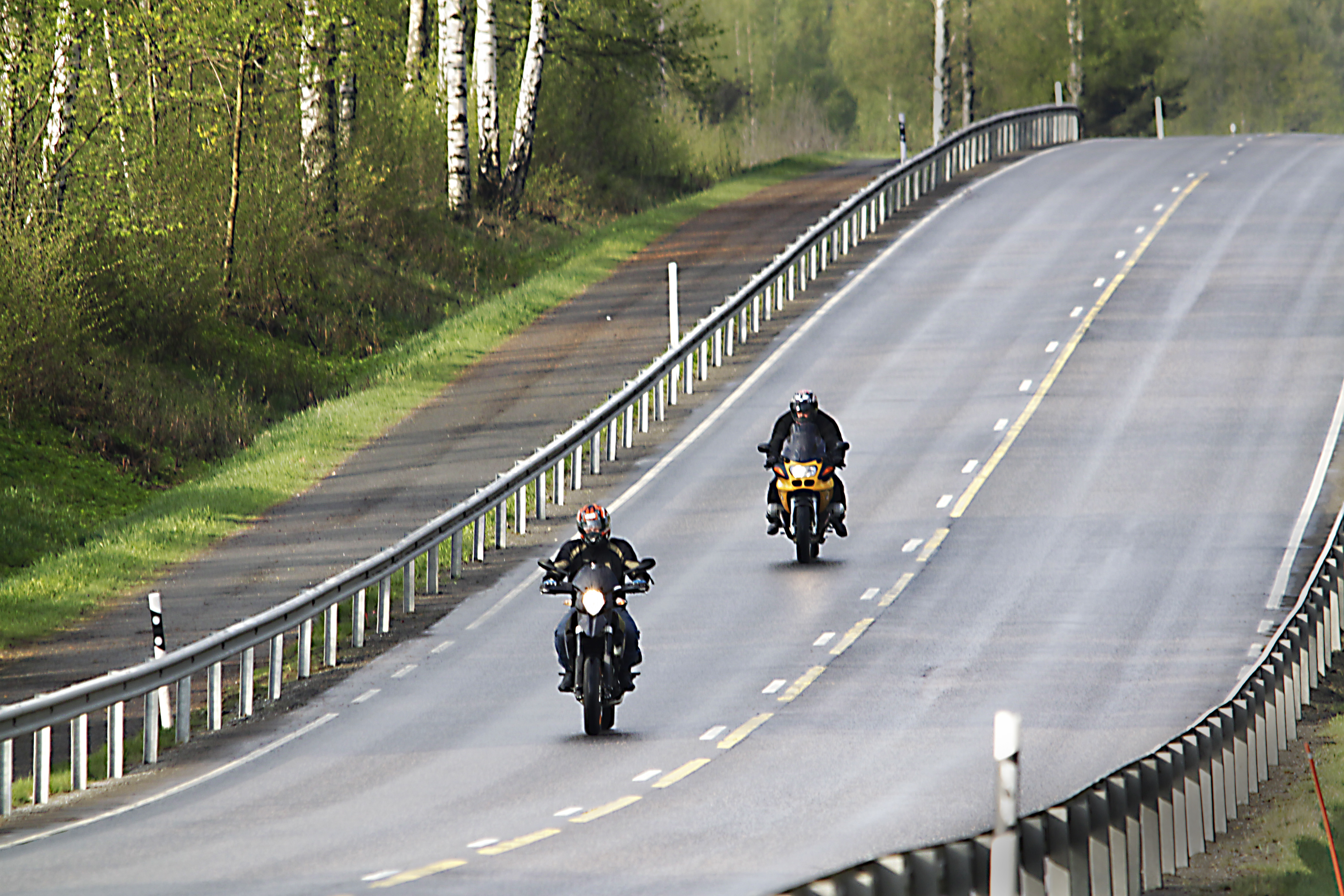
National road 12 in Nokia

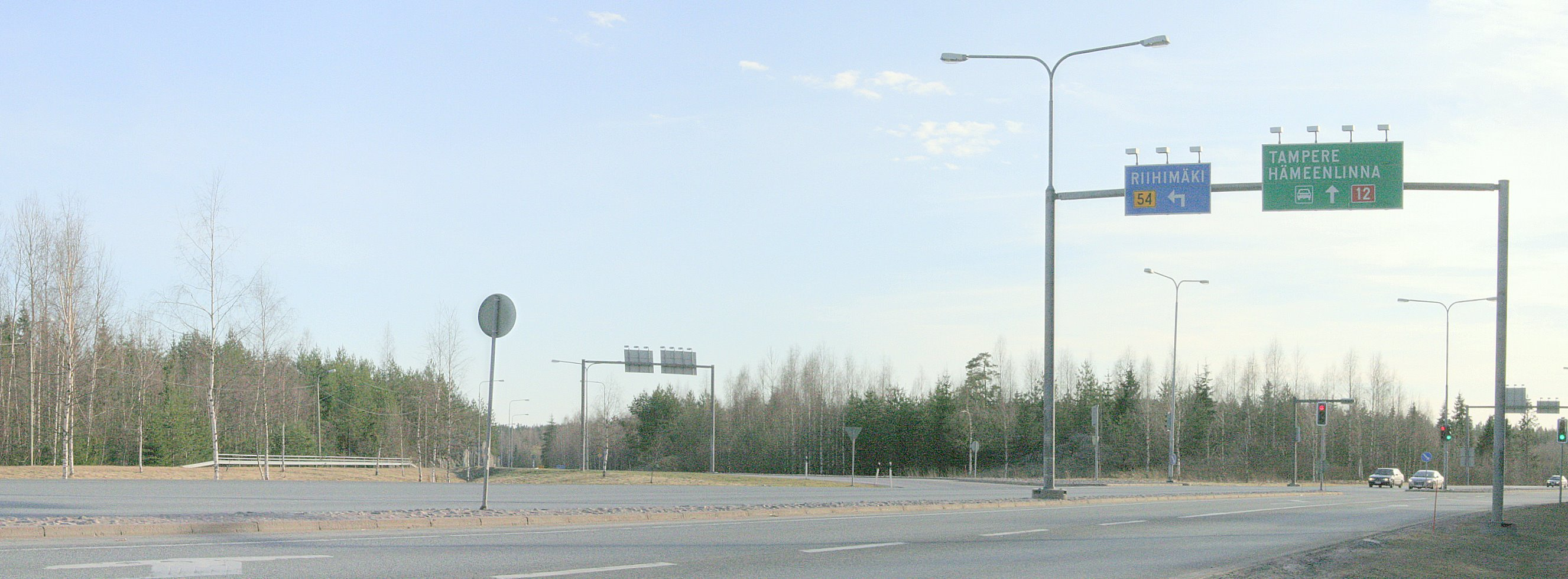
National road 12 in Hollola

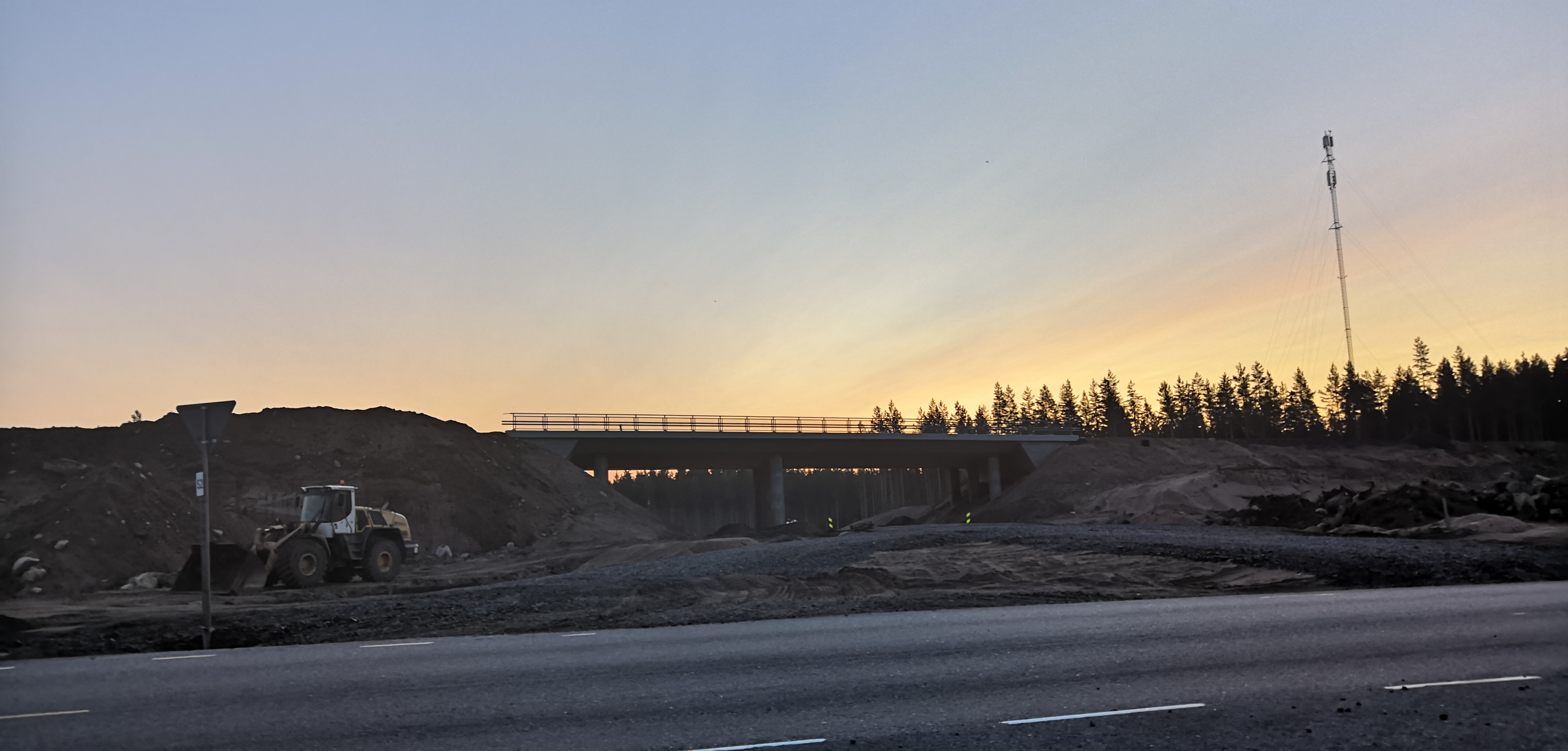
Bridge site in Iitti and Kouvola, (Kuusankoski) border in July 2019.

== See also ==
- Paasikiven–Kekkosentie
- Tampere Tunnel
- Satakunta (province)
- Häme (province)
