= Näsijärvi =

Lake in Pirkanmaa, Finland

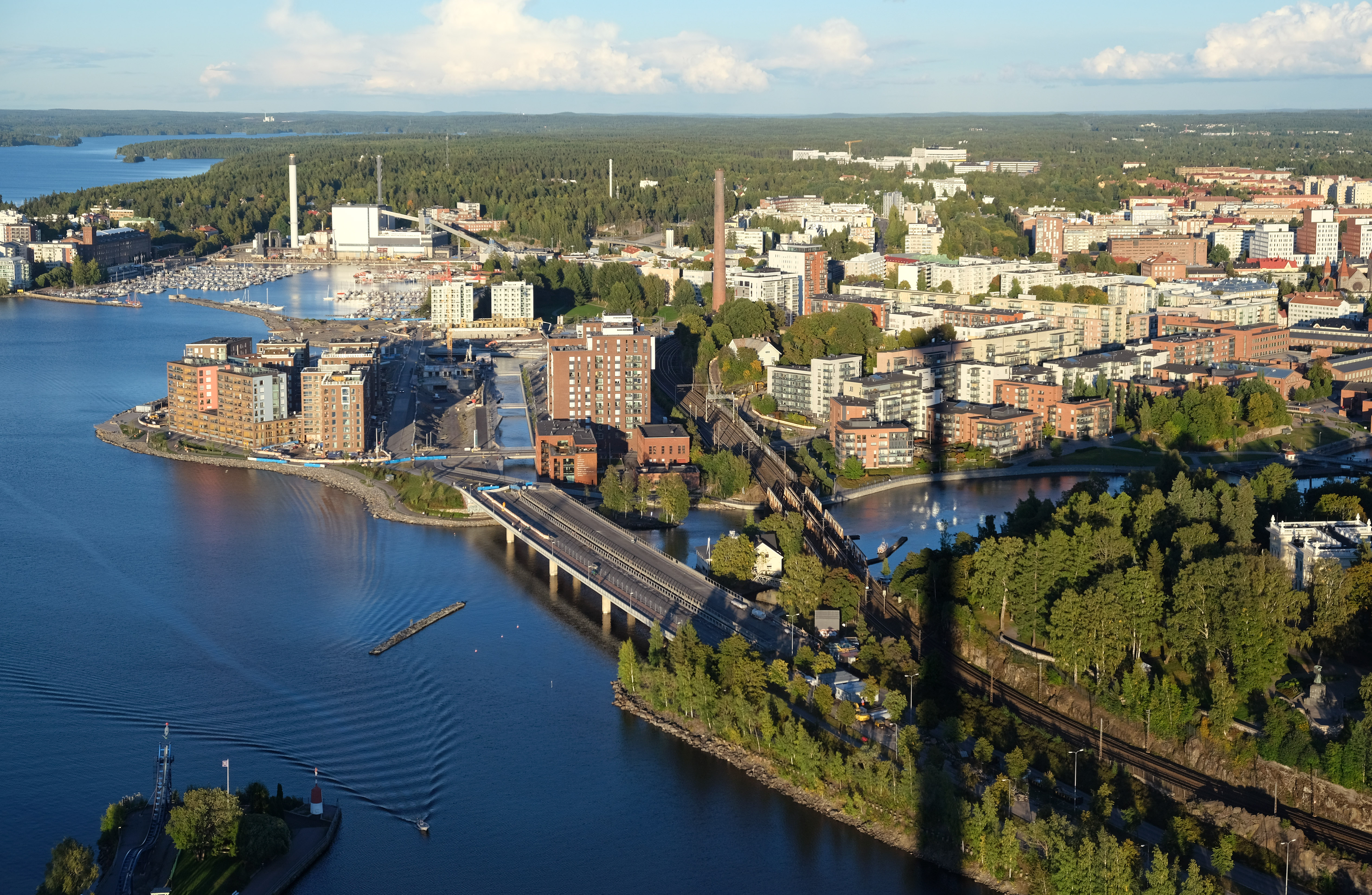
- Näsijärvi and Tammerkoski seen from Näsinneula tower

- Location within Finland
- Location: Pirkanmaa
- Coordinates: 61°34′N 023°46′E
- Primary outflows: Tammerkoski
- Catchment area: 7,672.29 km^{2} (2,962.29 sq mi)
- Basin countries: Finland
- Max. length: 40 km (25 mi)
- Surface area: 256.12 km^{2} (98.89 sq mi)
- Max. depth: 63 m (207 ft)
- Surface elevation: 95.4 m (313 ft)
- Settlements: Kuru, Tampere, Ylöjärvi

Näsijärvi (Finnish: [ˈnæsiˌjærʋi]) is a lake 95 metres (312 ft) above sea level, in the Pirkanmaa region of southern Finland. Näsijärvi is the biggest lake in the Tampere area at 256 square kilometres (99 sq mi) in size. The city of Tampere was built along the Tammerkoski rapids, through which the lake drains into Pyhäjärvi. The water quality of the lake has improved as the forestry industry has decreased the amount of waste water.

The lake is divided into three fjards: Näsinselkä, Koljonselkä and Vankavesi. Näsinselkä starts in the south from Tampere, where it expands to the west as Lielahti and to the east as Aitolahti. At the end of Aitolahti, it expands into a small Niihamanselkä, from which Olkahistenlahti diverges to the southeast and Merjanlahti and Laalahti to the northeast. To the north of Lielahti and Lentävänniemi is Siivikkalanlahti and behind it Ryydynpohja. Näsinselkä changes to Koljonselkä in the north after the Iso-Otava Island. In the case of the islands, a wide headland protrudes from the east towards the lake, the southern tip of which is called Paavolanniemi. To the northeast, there is the five-kilometer-long Tervalahti with its bay Uskalinlahti. On the opposite shore of Näsinselkä is Laakonselkä, a bay that is more than four kilometers long and tapering. Between Koljonselkä and Vankavesi is an archipelago, to the south of which the lake is crossed by the terminal moraine of the Inner Finland.

There are boat cruising services on Näsijärvi. In 1929, the steamer SS Kuru sinking in the lake, with at least 136 people drowning including the Member of the Parliament Ida Vihuri, remains the deadliest Finnish inland shipping disaster.

During the winter, usually during February and March, the lake is frozen in its entirety. Näsijärvi is then used for Nordic walking, cross-country skiing, and everyday pleasure walking. There is a small, rocky island upon which a lighthouse, called Siilinkari, is located; it is the most popular walking destination on the lake.

In the north Näsijärvi has a wide catchment area that includes among others the lakes Ruovesi, Kuorevesi, Keurusselkä, Tarjanne, Pihlajavesi, Toisvesi and Ähtärinjärvi.

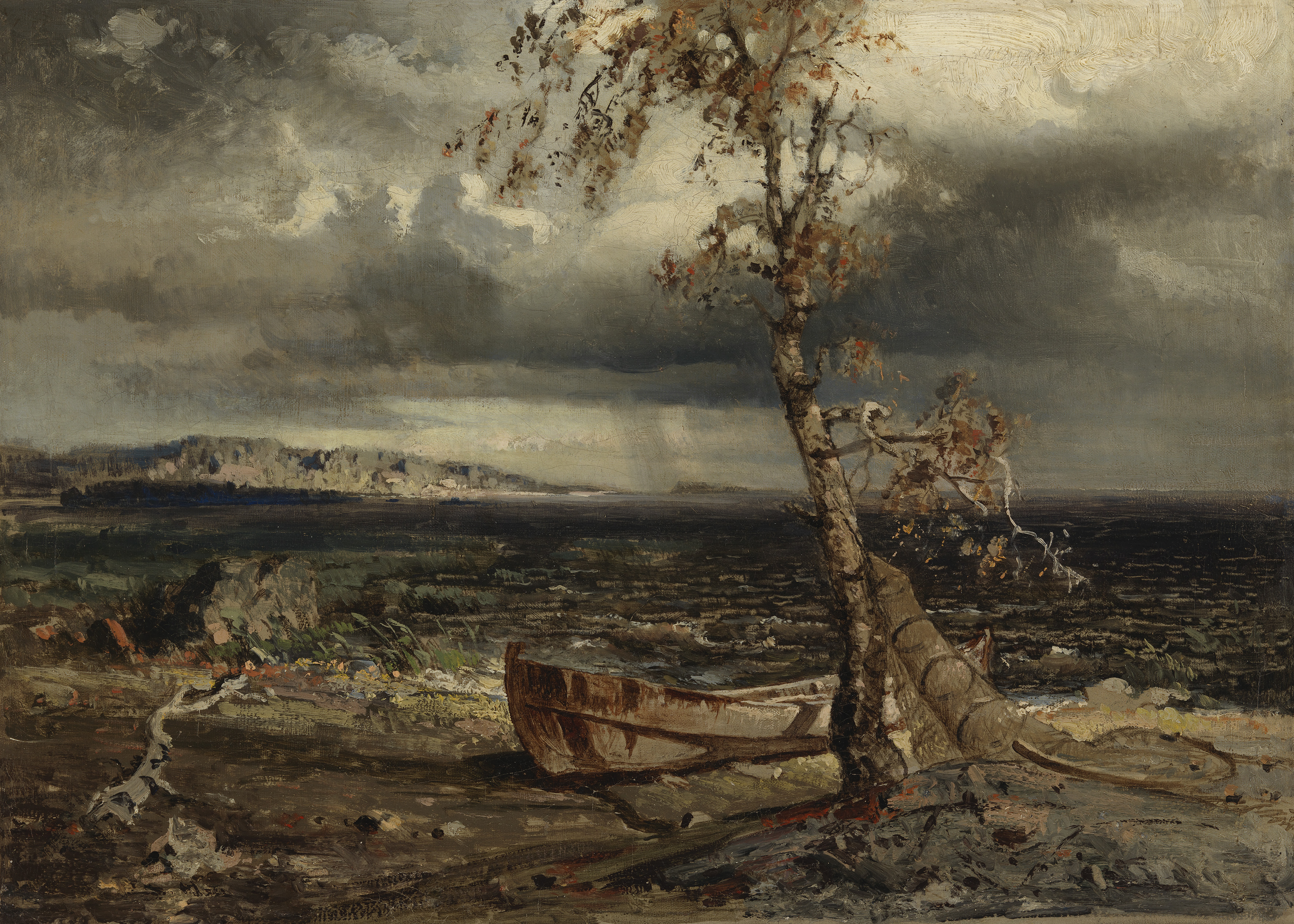
Storm on Lake Näsijärvi, Werner Holmberg, 1860

== See also ==
- List of lakes of Finland
- Paarlahti
- Näsinneula
- Näsilinna
