= Åkerlundinkatu =

Street in Tampere, Finland

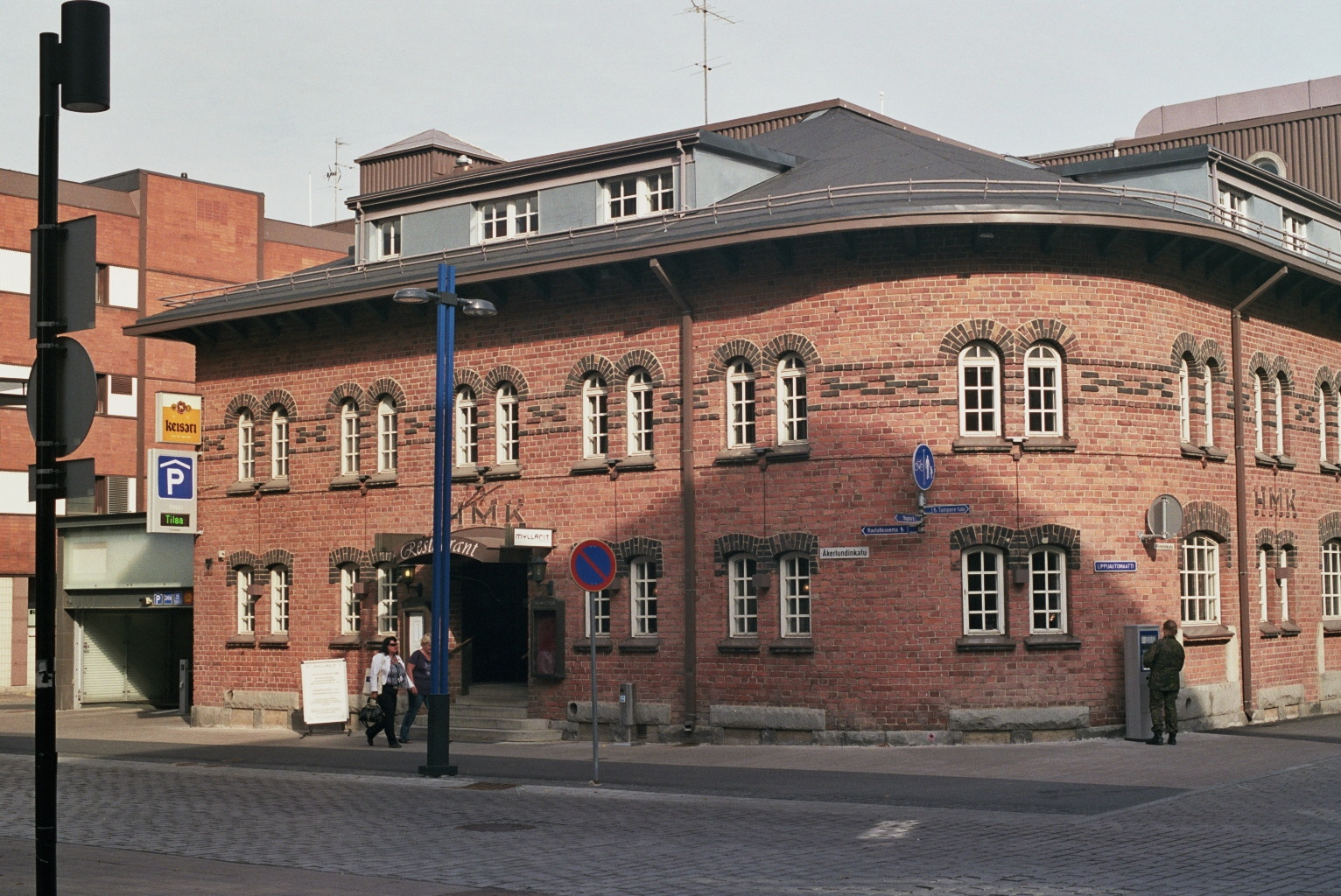
A building designed by Berndt Blom in 1902 at Åkerlundinkatu 4.

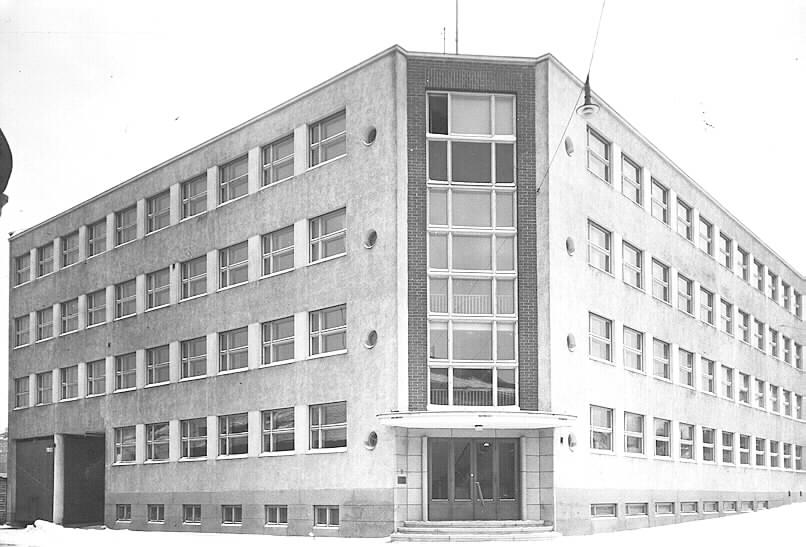
The old building of the Star medicinal factory designed by Jaakko Tähtinen and built in 1948 at the corner of Pinninkatu and Åkerlundinkatu.

Åkerlundinkatu is a street in the Tulli district of central Tampere, Finland, running east to west with a total length of about 25 metres. Its eastern end is located in front of the Tampere Hall at the intersection with Yliopistonkatu, while the western end is located next to the old locomotive stables at the intersection with Ratapihankatu. Other intersecting streets include Pinninkatu, Hammareninkatu and Sumeliuksenkatu.

The street was marked to the city's zoning plan 1897 when it was named Pakkahuoneenkatu. The name was based on the old customs warehouse or packing house located at the street's western end. When the city decided to build a new packing house about 300 metres further north, the zoning plan and street names were changed. In 1900 the street Pakkahuoneenkatu was renamed Åkerlundinkatu after the renowned Tamperean merchant Carl Wilhelm Åkerlund.

== Tampere Walk of Fame ==
Åkerlundinkatu hosts the Walk of Fame Finland, honouring the music of Finland and its creators. There are stars attached to the street surface bearing names of artists and bands renowned in the music industry. The first stars were laid to the eastern end of the street in October 2019. The first artists and groups to be honoured with starts were Cheek, Epe Helenius, Katri Helena, Juice Leskinen, Popeda, Kaija Saariaho and Jean Sibelius. Also recipients of the Tampere Music Award from 2010 to 2018 got their own stars.

In 2020 new stars were given to Ismo Alanko, Eppu Normaali, Paula Koivuniemi, Tapio Korjus, Karita Mattila and Nightwish. In 2021 new stars were given to Mikko Alatalo, Kaija Koo, Esa-Pekka Salonen, Yö and Värttinä.

New stars will be laid onto the Walk of Fame every year. The Walk of Fame is managed by the city of Tampere, the Tampere Hall and the Musiikki & Media event.
