= Sorsapuisto =

Park in Tampere, Finland

Coordinates: 61°29′48″N 23°46′54″E

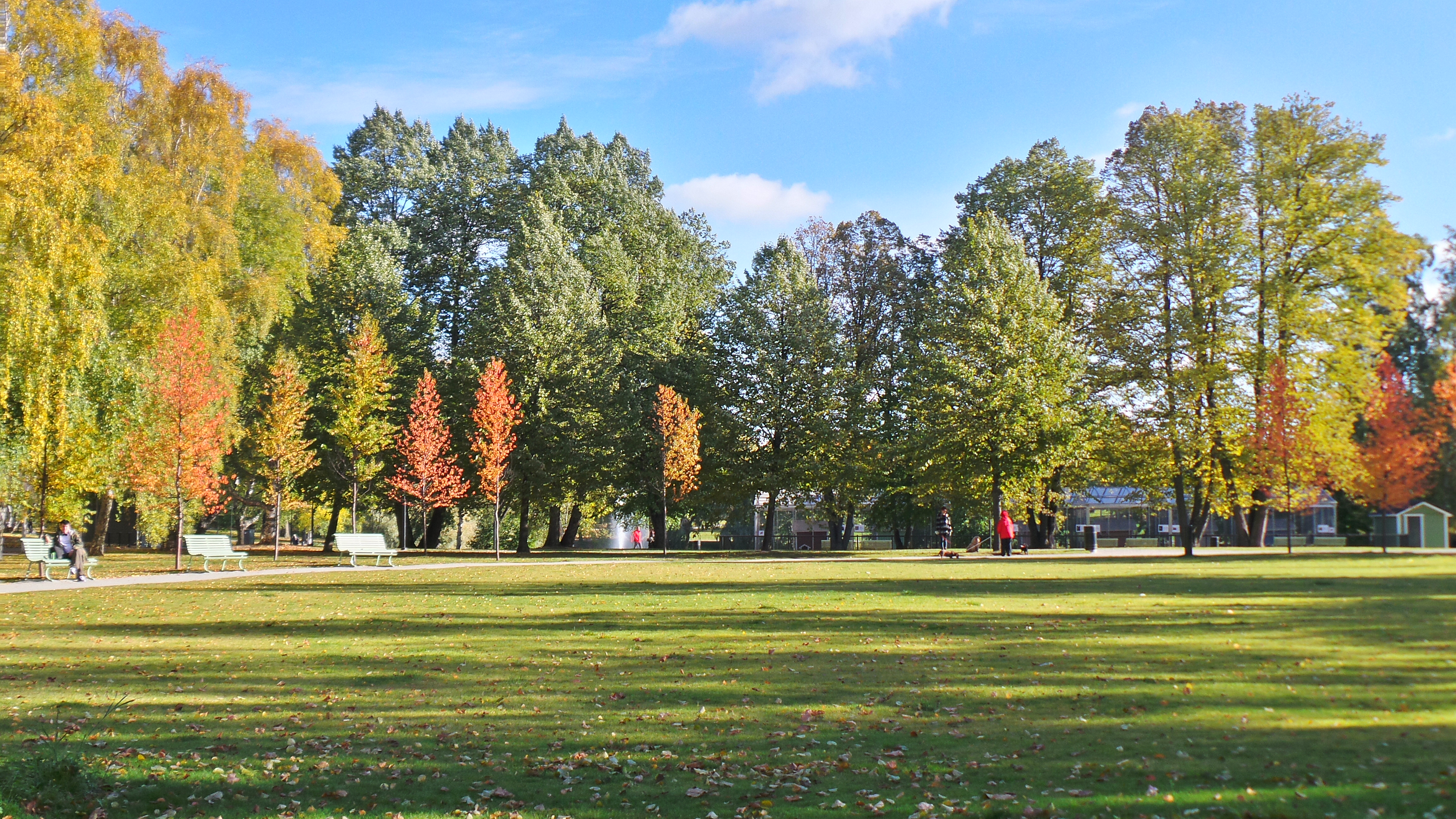
Sorsapuisto in autumn

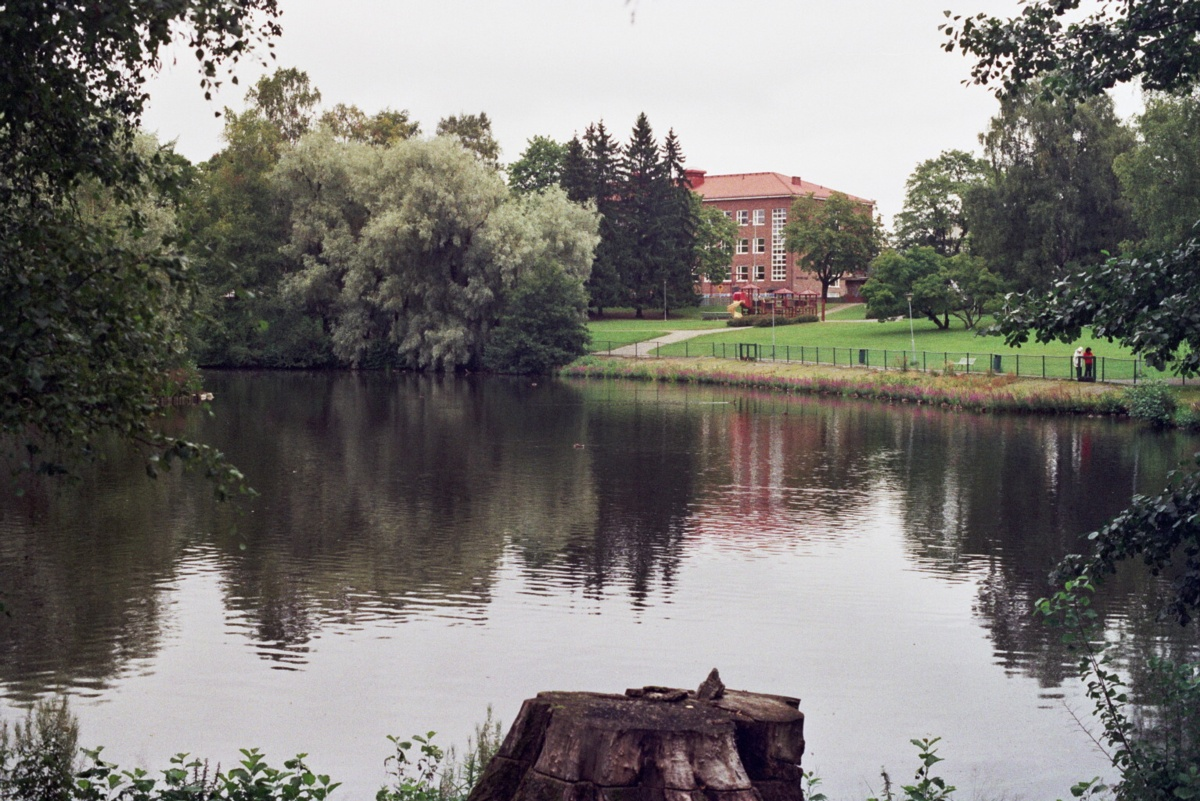
Sorsalampi

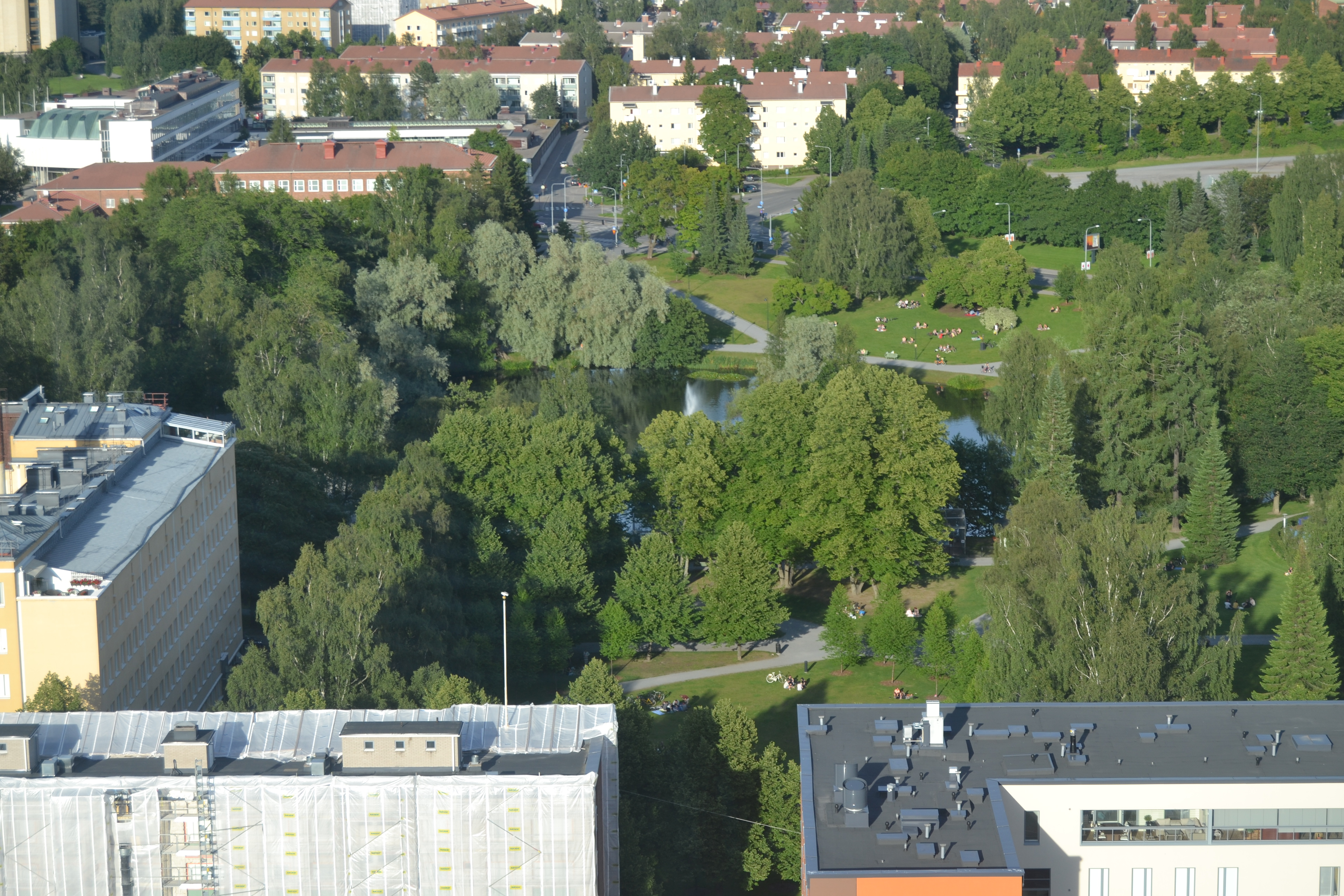
Sorsapuisto seen from Hotel Torni Tampere

Sorsapuisto (Finnish for "duck park") is a recreational area of 4.2 hectares in Tulli, Tampere, Finland, completed in the 1930s. In 1990 the Tampere Hall was built in the south corner of the park and the whole park was renovated. From 1964 to 1972 the site of the Tampere Hall hosted the Tampere zoo featuring the lions Tam and Pere.

== Sorsapuisto in the past ==
Still in the early 20th century the site of the Sorsapuisto park was full of potato fields and a small modest spring, which burst into a small pond, in 1902 or 1903 according to contemporary witness John Tammela. The pond was called Tammelanlammi.

The Lähteenkatu ("spring street") street near Sorsapuisto was named after the spring previously located at the site of the Tammelanlammi pond.

Only in the early 1930s was a refreshment park built around the Tammelanlammi pond as work for the unemployed. Tame ducks were introduced to the Tammelanlampi pond in the 1930s, and the pond was thus called Sorsalampi ("duck pond").

== Sorsapuisto in the present ==
In the middle of Sorsapuisto is the pond Sorsalampi which is popular among birds. As well as ducks, birds frequenting the pond include geese and swans, which the park department of the city acquired to the pond since 1939. Bird cages around the pond also contain peacocks, turkeys and various chicken species. There is a small island in the middle of the pond. In 2012, the city sold the birds to the Peikkorinne avian farm in Askola and rents them to Sorsapuisto in summertime. Previously the birds used to spend the winter in the Hatanpää avian farm.

Throughout the decades, the park has been popular among families with children because of its diverse selection of play equipment. The play areas are located all around the park. The area previously hosted a children's traffic park founded in 1956 and a waddling pool with a water slide. The traffic park was moved to Kaleva in the late 1980s.

There are buildings representing architecture from various eras around the park. As well as the Tampere Hall, significant buildings include Lähteenlinna (E. A. Liuha 1928), Sorsapuistontalo (Jaakko Tähtinen 1937) and the Kaleva high school (previously known as the Kaleva school, Jaakko Ilveskoski 1955).
