= Sampo (district) =

City district in Tampere, Finland

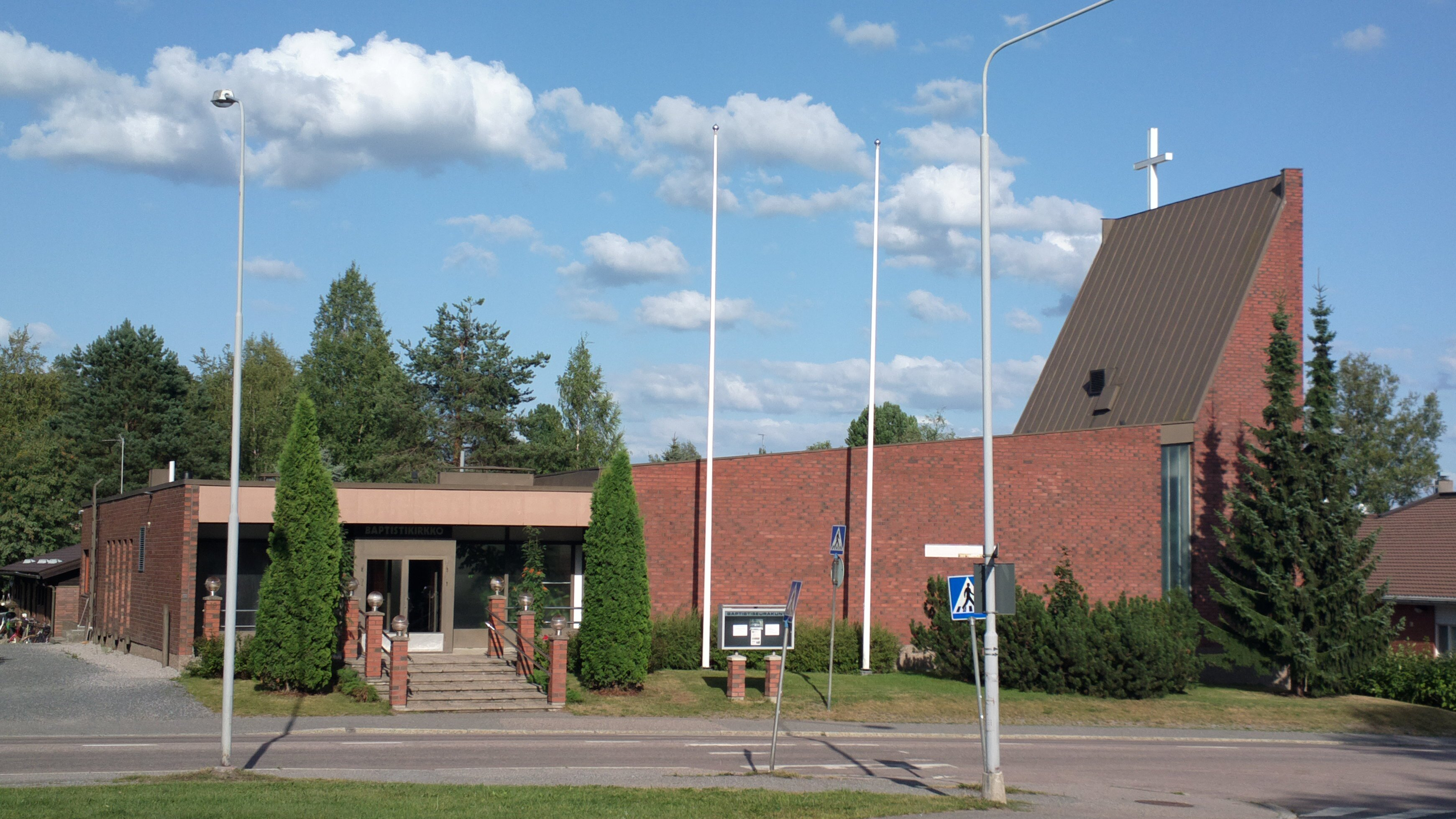
Baptist church of Tampere in Kissanmaa, Sampo

Sampo is one of the main districts in the city center of Tampere in Pirkanmaa, Finland. So-called planning area of Sampo includes the statistical areas of Kalevanrinne, Liisankallio, Petsamo, Lappi, Lapinniemi, Kaleva, Järvensivu, Vuohenoja, Kauppi and Kissanmaa.

Sampo is home to the Sampo School, a primary school with 1–9. classes, which forms a common school path with the Kissanmaa School when moving to the 7th grade. Sampo's school also has a Sairaalankatu office.

The name "Sampo" refers to the mythological artifact Sampo mentioned in the Finnish national epic, the Kalevala. A newspaper called Sampo was also published in Tampere in 1888.

== See also ==
- Iides
- Keskusta
- Sammonkatu
