= Kalevanharju =

District of Tampere, Finland

Coordinates: 61°29′36″N 23°47′02″E

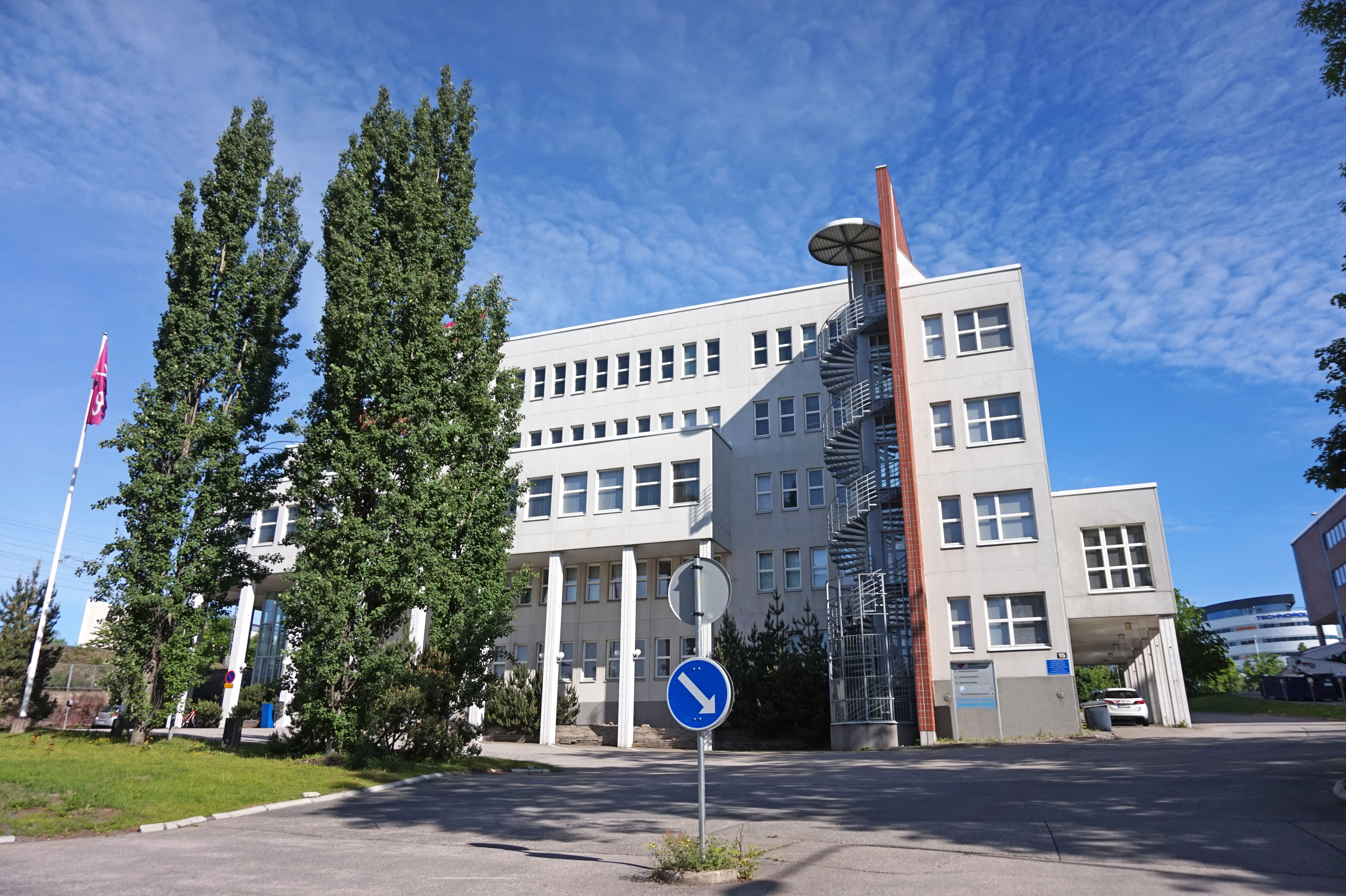
The Tampere Adult Education Center in Kalevanharju

Kalevanharju (lit. 'Kaleva Esker') is a district of Tampere, Finland. It is bordered on the north by Liisankallio, on the northeast by Kaleva, on the east by Kalevanrinne, on the south by Hatanpää, on the west by Ratina and on the northwest by Tulli. The Central Campus of the Tampere University, the Kalevankangas Cemetery and the Tampere Adult Education Center are located in Kalevanharju.

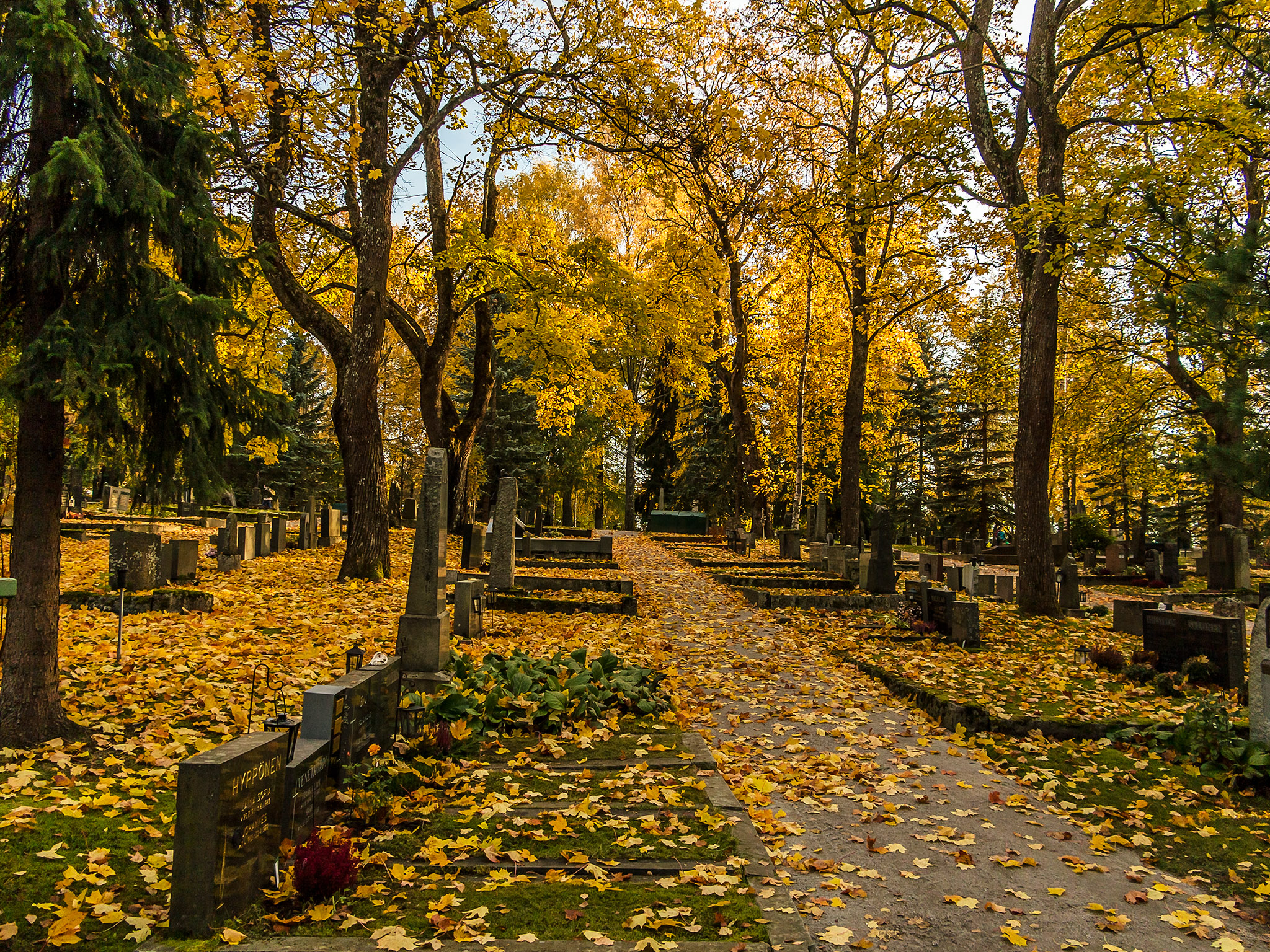
The Kalevankangas Cemetery in October 2015

On the west side of the cemetery was the State General Hospital, which had moved there from the edge of Nalkala Square in 1910. The hospital, whose main building was in the shape of the letter H, contained features of Art Nouveau and Classicism. To the north of the hospital was the Kalevanharju orphanage, founded in 1925, which included a nursery and a milk distribution station for infants. In the area south and southwest of Kalevanharju, between the Tehdaskatu street and the Viinikanoja ditch, there were several small industrial plants: the Tampere's brewery, founded in 1922, the Tampere box factory, which started operations in 1923, and the Tuotannon leipomo bakery, designed by Frans Jousi, was built in 1927. Tehdaskatu 15, on the other hand, housed Osuusliike Voima's soft drink factory from 1924 onwards.

Kalevanharju also has an urban cultivation garden called Kalevanharjun yhteisöviljelmä, where the townspeople grow food plants in cultivation sacks and boxes, experimenting together. The plantation has been in operation since spring 2014 and currently includes about 60 culture sacks and boxes, which are cultivated and cared for by a team of about 15 people.
