= Kaleva Church =

Church in Tampere, Finland

Coordinates: 61°29′57″N 023°47′38″E

- Kalevan kirkko
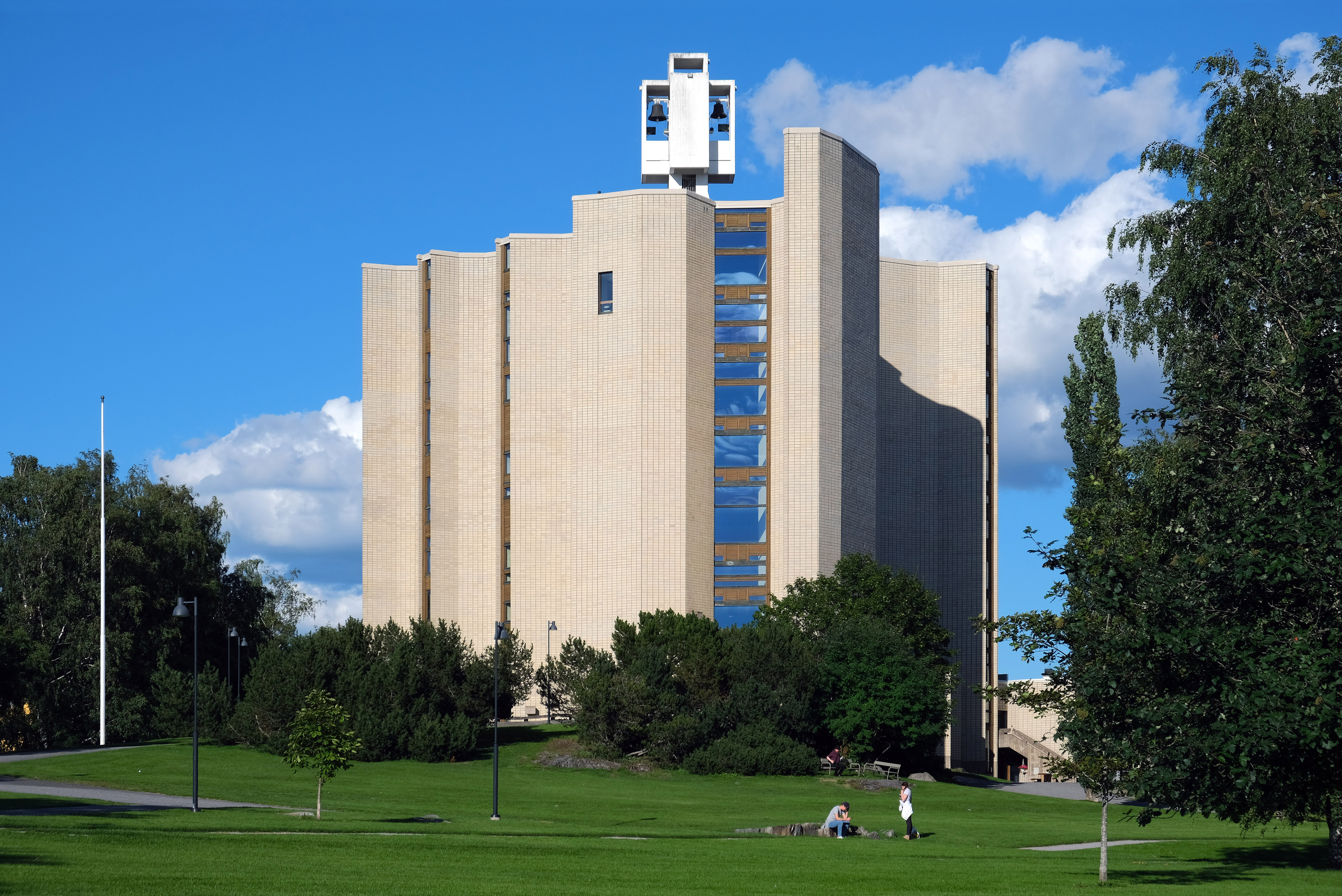
- Main facade of Kaleva Church in Tampere.
- Location: Tampere
- Country: Finland
- Denomination: Lutheran

Architecture
- Architect(s): Reima Pietilä, Raili Pietilä
- Style: modernism

Kaleva Church (Finnish: Kalevan kirkko; Swedish: Kalevakyrkan) is an Evangelical Lutheran Church of Finland church building in the Liisankallio district of Tampere, Finland. It was designed by Reima and Raili Pietilä and built in 1964–66. The church accommodates approximately 1,120 people. It is considered an example of modern architectural style and is one of the main sights of Tampere.

== History ==
Kaleva parish was established in 1953, but without its own church. In 1959, the board of the Evangelical Lutheran Churches in Tampere announced a competition to design a church building for the parish. The entry selected was by architect Reima Pietilä, whose architectural partner (and, from 1963, wife) Raili Paatelainen later became involved in the project.

The site chosen for the church was a small hill at the head of the convergence of two of Tampere's major streets: Teiskontie and Sammonkatu.

== Architecture ==
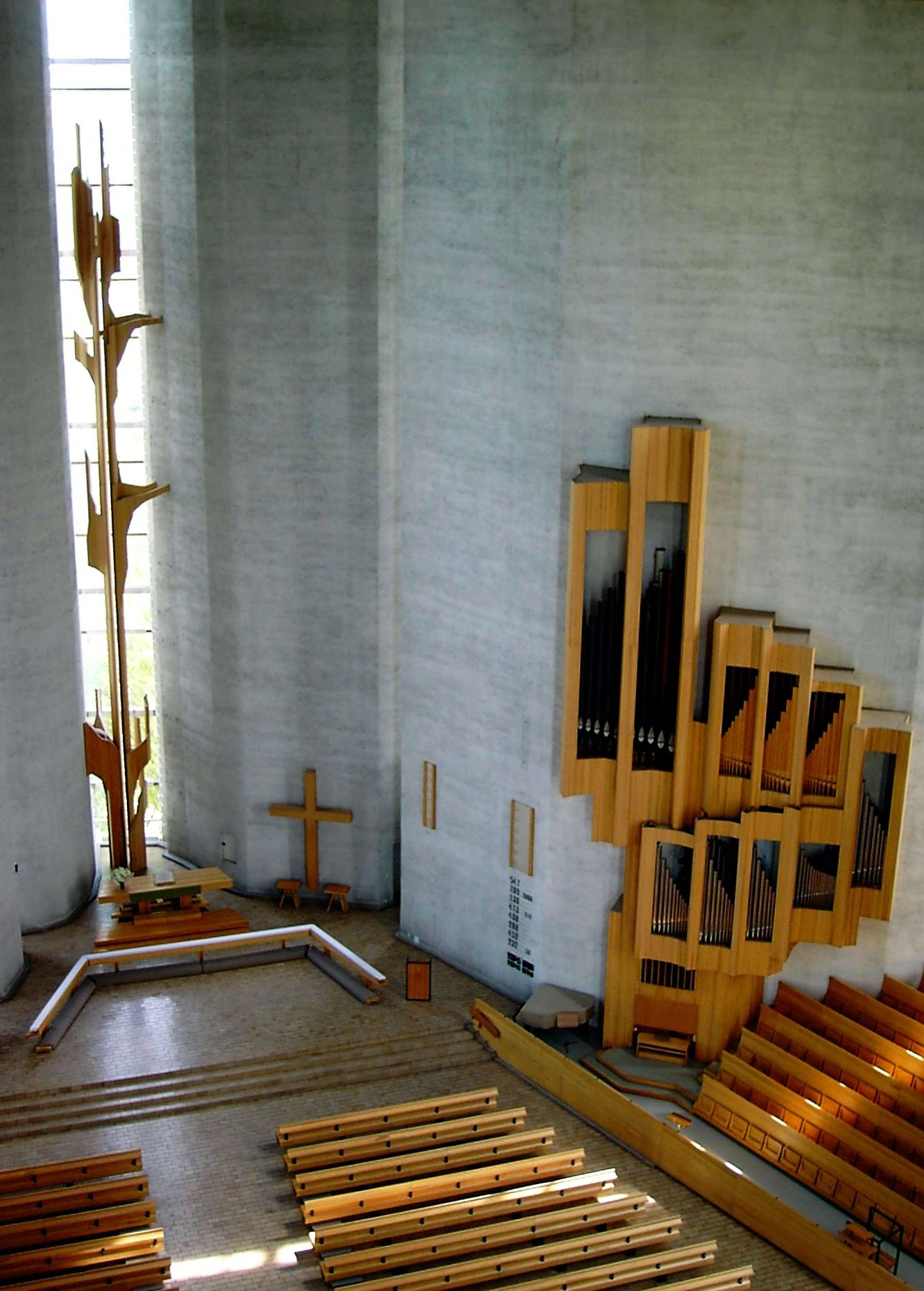
Interior view from the bell tower hatch, showing the altar and organ

The building was constructed using slip forming. It is made from 17 narrow 35 m (115 ft)-high hollow concrete u-shapes, with full height windows between them. Like the windows, there are also 18 entrances to the building. These concrete u’s are all slightly different. Because at the time many grain elevators in Finland were built with slip forming, the church got the nicknames “Silo of the Souls” and “Viljanen’s Silo” (referring to the Vicar Paavo Viljanen). The 35 m (115 ft)-high walls were cast in 12 days.

The surface area of the church is 3,600 m^{2} (39,000 sq ft), and its volume is 47,000 m^{3} (1,700,000 cu ft). The floor plan of the church resembles a fish, an ancient symbol of Christianity. The main hall is 30 m (98 ft) high and offers seating for 1120 people.

The roof of the church is flat, and surmounted by a bell tower in the shape of a stylised cross, housing three bells manufactured in West Germany. In addition to the main hall, the church features a chapel, sacristy and auxiliary facilities. All furnishings in the church are made of lacquered Finnish pine.

== Recognition ==
The plans for the church had already received international attention before building started. The church is considered to be among the key works of post-war Finnish modernism and was protected by the Church Act in 2006. Kaleva Church is featured on the Docomomo Finland list of modern Finnish architectural masterpieces.
