= Yliopistonkatu =

Yliopistonkatu may refer to:

- Yliopistonkatu (Helsinki)
- Yliopistonkatu (Tampere)
- Yliopistonkatu (Turku)
