= Kalevanrinne =

City district in Tampere, Finland

Coordinates: 61°29′33.98226″N 23°48′25.57663″E

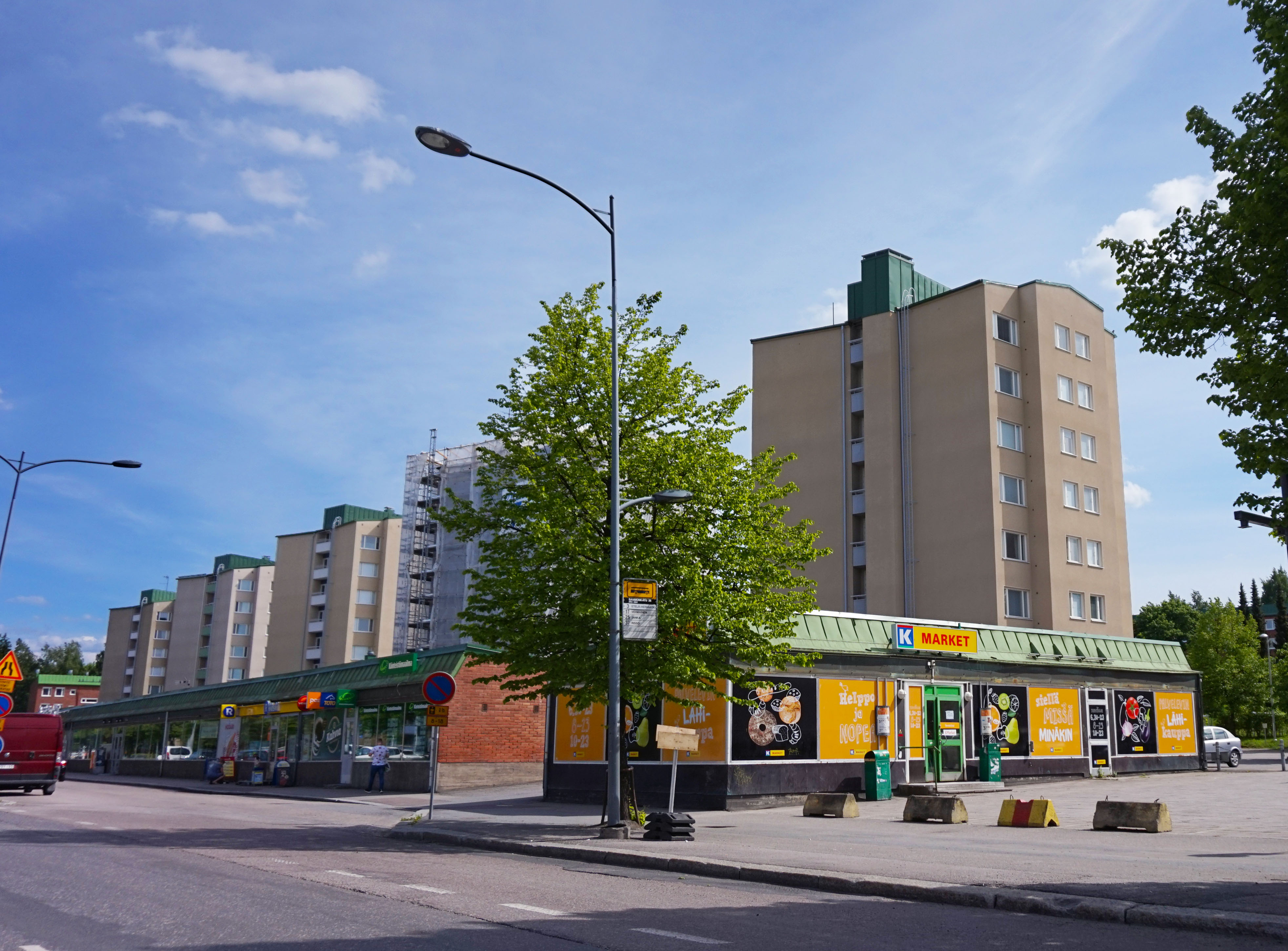
Kalevanrinne at the Sammonkatu street

Kalevanrinne is a district of Tampere, Finland. It is located in the Sampo area between the districts of Kaleva and Järvensivu, bordering Liisankallio and Kalevanharju in the west, Hakametsä and Vuohenoja in the east. The city plan of Kalevanrinne was confirmed in 1951 and supplemented in 1955 and 1960. Kalevanrinne has a hypermarket Prisma, a pet store Musti ja Mirri and an electronics store Gigantti. There are also 13 planned apartment buildings in the area, which means that the Kalevanrinne residential area, located between Kalevantie and Sammonkatu, is planned to have about 1,360 inhabitants. The planned area is about 3,5 hectares in size.

Kalevanrinne was once known in 1918 as the location of a prison camp for red prisoners during the Finnish Civil War.
