= Kyiv Park =

Park in Tampere, Finland

Coordinates: 61.500°N 23.801°E

The Kyiv Park (Finnish: Kiovanpuisto) is a public park located in the Kaleva district, city of Tampere, Finland.

Tampere and Kyiv have been twin cities since 1954; for Tampere, Kyiv was the first twin city outside the Nordic countries.

In the middle of the park there is a statue called Ystävyyskaupunkiveistos (literary "twin city sculpture") depicting two girls holding a hoop. The atelier house of Tampere is located at the edge of the park. A large part of the park is considered built cultural heritage.
