= Yliopistonkatu (Tampere) =

Street in Tampere, Finland

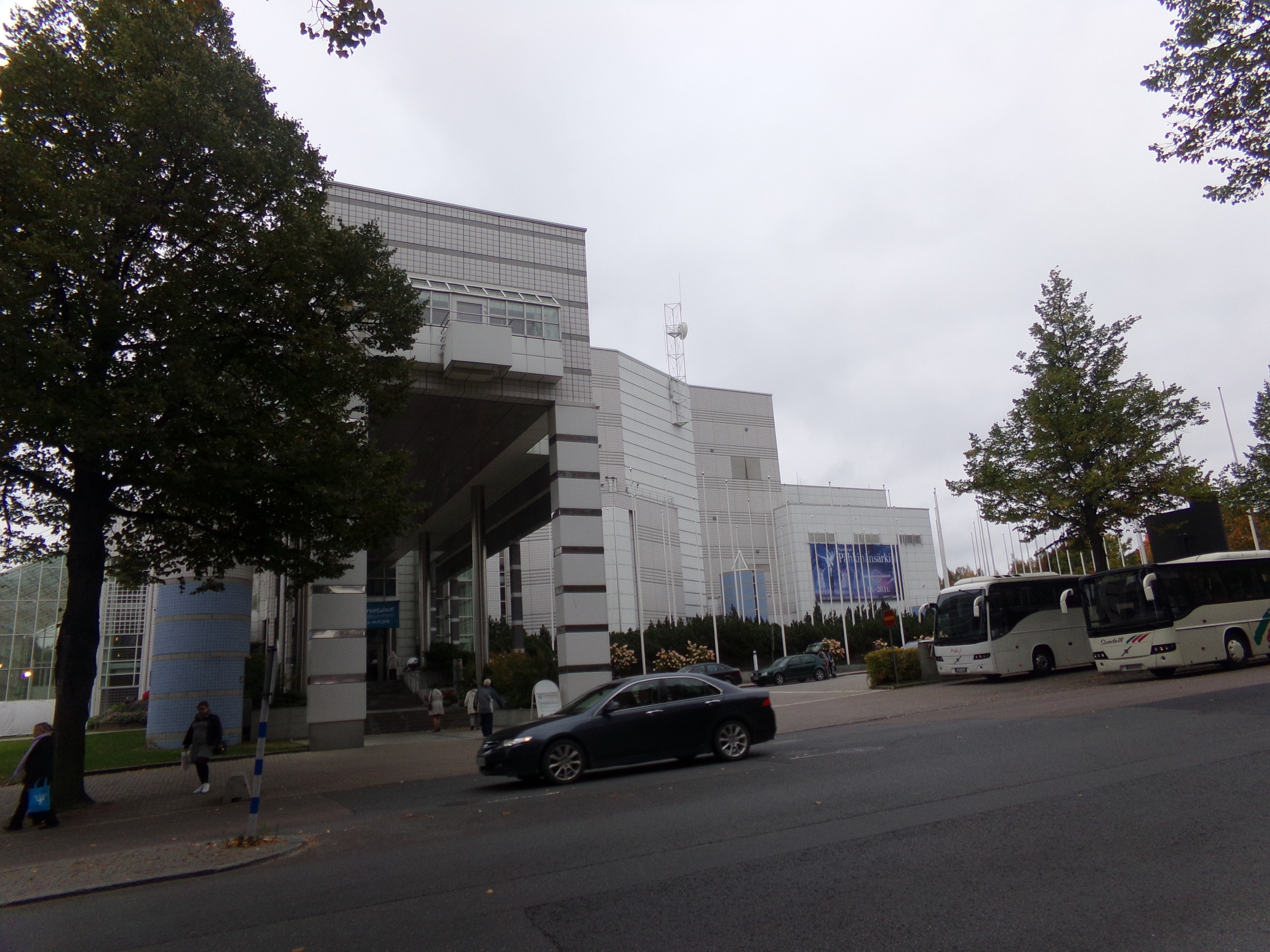
The Tampere Hall seen from the Yliopistonkatu street

Yliopistonkatu (literally "University Street") is a north–south street in the Tulli district of Tampere, Finland. The street is a southern extension of Tammelan puistokatu, which starts at Itsenäisyydenkatu and extends south to Kalevantie. It is 400 meters long. To the east of the street is the Sorsapuisto park area and the Tampere Hall, a concert and congress center completed in 1990.

Originally, the street was only the southern part of Tammelan puistokatu, but in 1984 it was named Yliopistonkatu on the initiative of the University of Tampere, which turned 60 years old. The university campus is located at the southern end of the street across Kalevantie.
