= Itsenäisyydenkatu =

Street in Tampere, Finland

Coordinates: 61°29′56″N 023°46′47″E

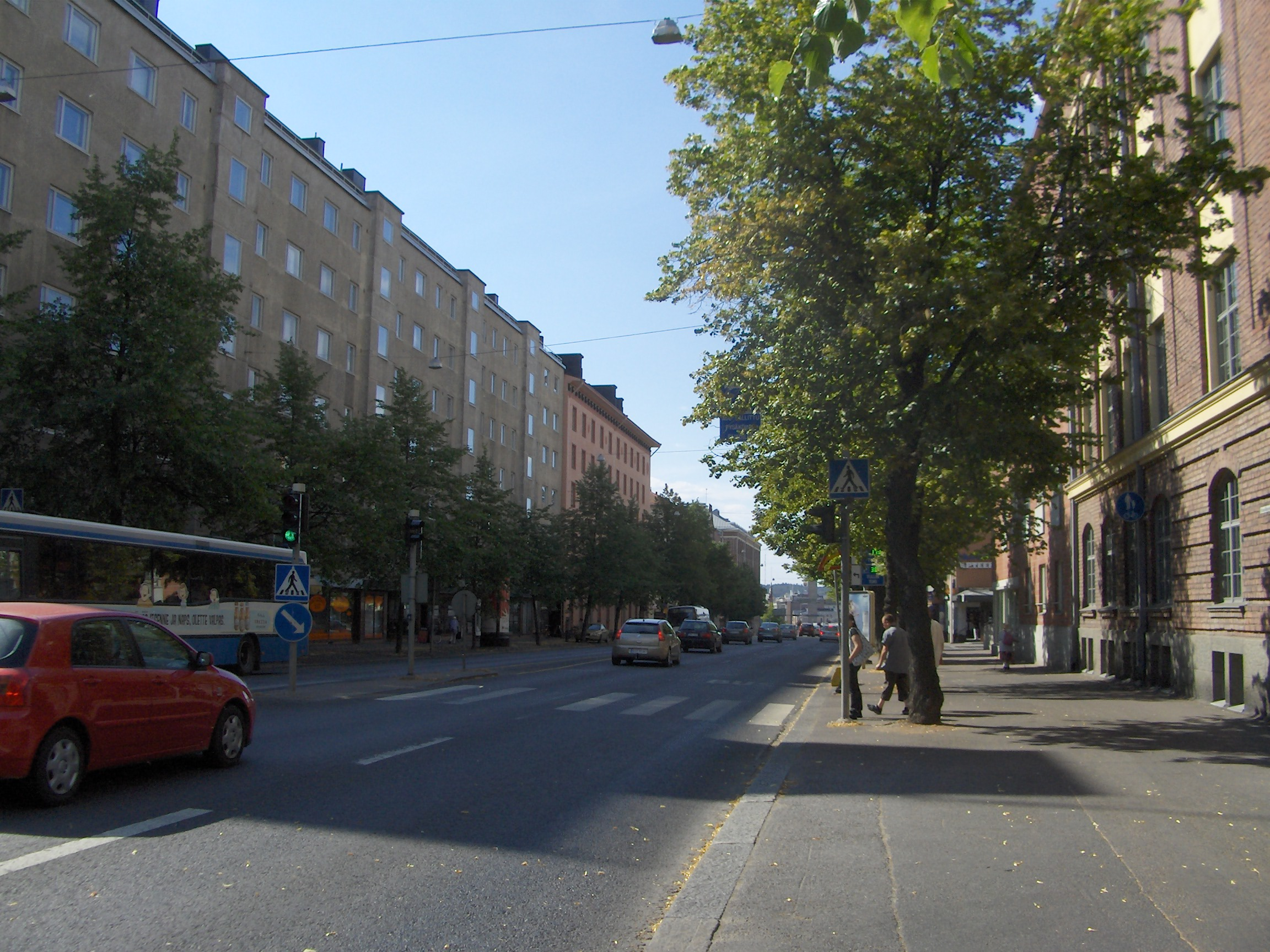
Itsenäisyydenkatu

Itsenäisyydenkatu (literally "Independence Street") is an east–west street in the center of Tampere, Finland. It is a significant street connection in the city center of Tampere in terms of transport connections, as it leads from Tampere's railway station to the Liisankallio district in the Tammela district. On the west side of the station, the street continues as the Hämeenkatu street, at its eastern end it meets Kalevan puistokatu, branching into Teiskontie and Sammonkatu. Today, the only crossroads on Itsenäisyydenkatu with cross-street vehicle traffic is Tammelan puistokatu–Yliopistonkatu.

Itsenäisyydenkatu was known from the end of the 19th century until the 1950s as the Puolimatkankatu according to the croft named Puolimatka (literally "half way") located in the area. The impetus for renaming the street was the call made by the state to the cities in 1957 to name a significant street Itsenäisyydenkatu in honor of the 40th anniversary of Finland's independence. The name change took effect in 1958.

In 2017, the renovation of the street and the station tunnel began, where the cross-section of the street will be renewed for a tramway to be built in Tampere. The former bus lanes were reserved for the local light rail network so that it runs west of the intersection of Tammelan puistokatu at the south side of the street and east of the intersection in the middle of the street; due to the arrangement, the southern surface of the station tunnel had to be lowered. A bike path was built on the northern edge of the street, and all the aged piping under the street was renewed. The renovation was completed in 2019, and tram traffic will begin in 2021.

== Sights ==
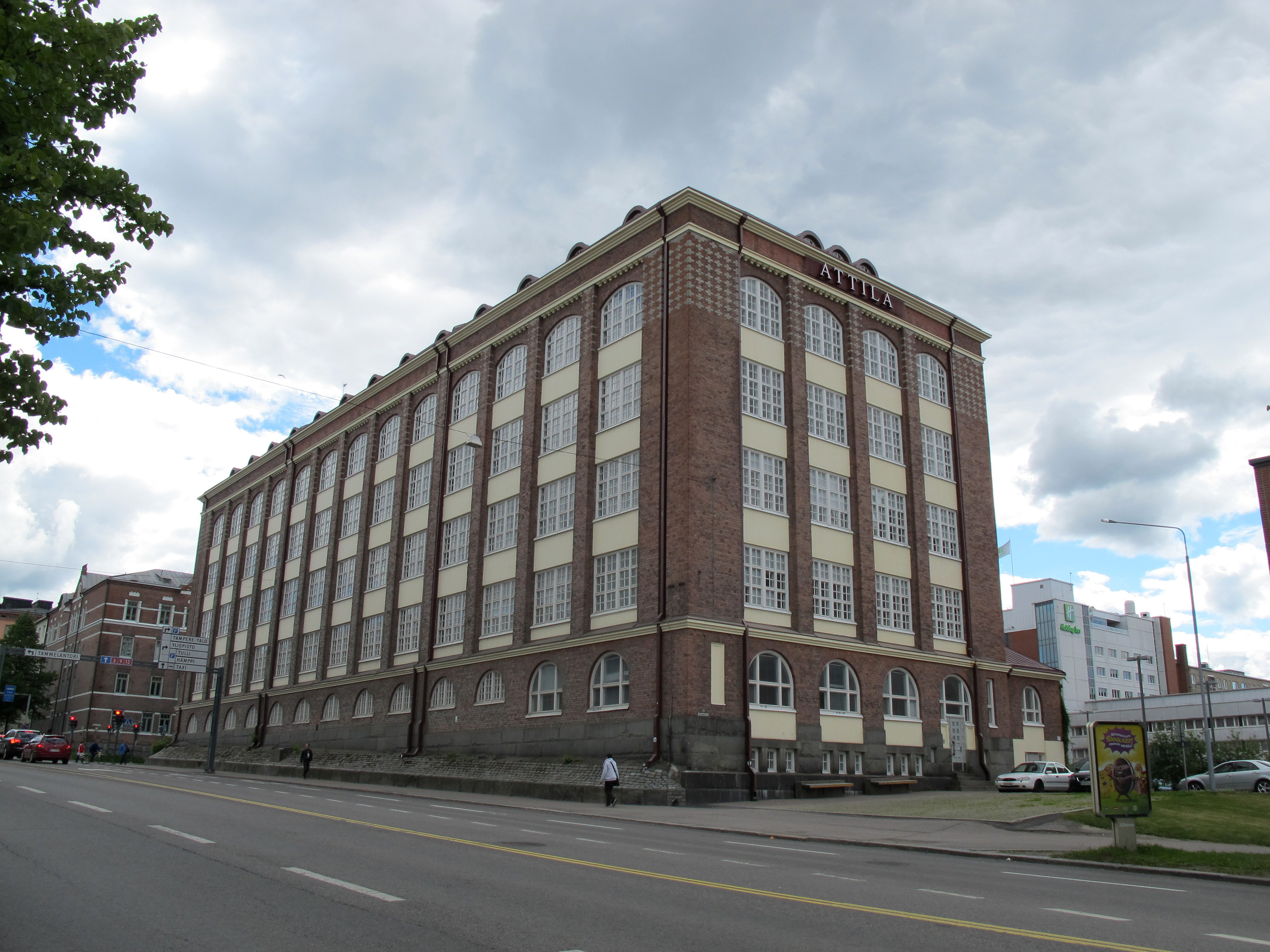
Attila factory building along street

- Attila, an old shoe factory building now in office use
- Luminary, Tampere's tallest residential building
- Lähteenlinna, a large residential apartment building representing classicism
- Toralinna, a former apartment building for railway workers
- Tullikamari Cultural Center (Tullikamarin kulttuurikeskus), a multifunctional cultural center operating in an old customs chamber building

== See also ==
- Hämeenkatu
- Yliopistonkatu (Tampere)
