= Santtu-Matias Rouvali =

Finnish conductor and percussionist (born 1985)

Santtu-Matias Rouvali (born 5 November 1985) is a Finnish conductor and percussionist. He is currently principal conductor of the Philharmonia Orchestra.

== Biography ==
Rouvali was born in Lahti into a family of musicians. Rouvali's parents played in the Lahti Symphony Orchestra. He is the oldest of the three sons in his family. One of his younger brothers died in a car accident at age 23.

Rouvali learned percussion as a youngster, and continued his studies at the Sibelius Academy. Rouvali competed in the Eurovision Young Soloists Finnish qualifier in 2004 as a percussionist. As a percussionist, he performed with such orchestras as the Mikkeli City Orchestra, the Lahti Symphony Orchestra, and the Finnish Radio Symphony Orchestra. At age 22, he focused more on studies in conducting at the Sibelius Academy, where his teachers included Jorma Panula, Leif Segerstam and Hannu Lintu.

In September 2009, Rouvali guest-conducted the Finnish Radio Symphony Orchestra as an emergency substitute conductor. He first guest-conducted the Tapiola Sinfonietta in November 2010. Later in the same month, the Tapiola Sinfonietta named Rouvali an artist-in-association with the orchestra, effective September 2011, with an agreement of 3 years.

Rouvali first guest-conducted the Tampere Philharmonic Orchestra in January 2010. He subsequently returned as a guest conductor in December 2011. In September 2012, the orchestra announced the appointment of Rouvali as its chief conductor, effective with the 2013–2014 season, with an initial contract of 3 years. His Tampere contract was later extended to 2020. Rouvali concluded his chief conductorship in Tampere at the close of the 2022–2023 season.

Outside Finland, Rouvali first guest-conducted the Copenhagen Philharmonic in November 2011. He subsequently became principal guest conductor of the Copenhagen Philharmonic with the 2013–2014 season. In August 2014, Rouvali made his first guest-conducting appearance with the Gothenburg Symphony Orchestra (GSO). In May 2016, the GSO announced the appointment of Rouvali as its next chief conductor, effective with the 2017–2018 season, with an initial contract of 4 years. In May 2019, the GSO announced the extension of Rouvali's contract through 2025. In December 2023, the GSO announced that Rouvali is to stand down as its chief conductor at the close of the 2024–2025 season.

Rouvali first guest-conducted the Philharmonia Orchestra in January 2013. In March 2017, the Philharmonia announced the appointment of Rouvali as one of its two new principal guest conductors, effective with the 2017–2018 season. In May 2019, the Philharmonia announced the appointment of Rouvali as its next principal conductor, effective with the 2021–2022 season, with an initial contract of 5 years. In September 2020, the Philharmonia released its first recording with Rouvali as conductor, a recording of Swan Lake made in 2019. In September 2026, the Philharmonia announced that Rouvali is to stand down as its principal conductor at the close of the 2027–2028 season.

Rouvali has made commercial recordings with the Oulu Philharmonic Orchestra for Ondine, and with the Tampere Philharmonic for Orfeo. He has conducted music of Sibelius with the Gothenburg Symphony for Alpha Classics.

Rouvali and his family live in Lepsämä in the municipality of Nurmijärvi.

Cultural offices
| Preceded by Hannu Lintu | Chief Conductor, Tampere Philharmonic Orchestra; 2013–2023 | Succeeded by Matthew Halls |
