= Hämeenkatu =

Street in Tampere, Finland

Coordinates: 61°29′52″N 23°45′37″E

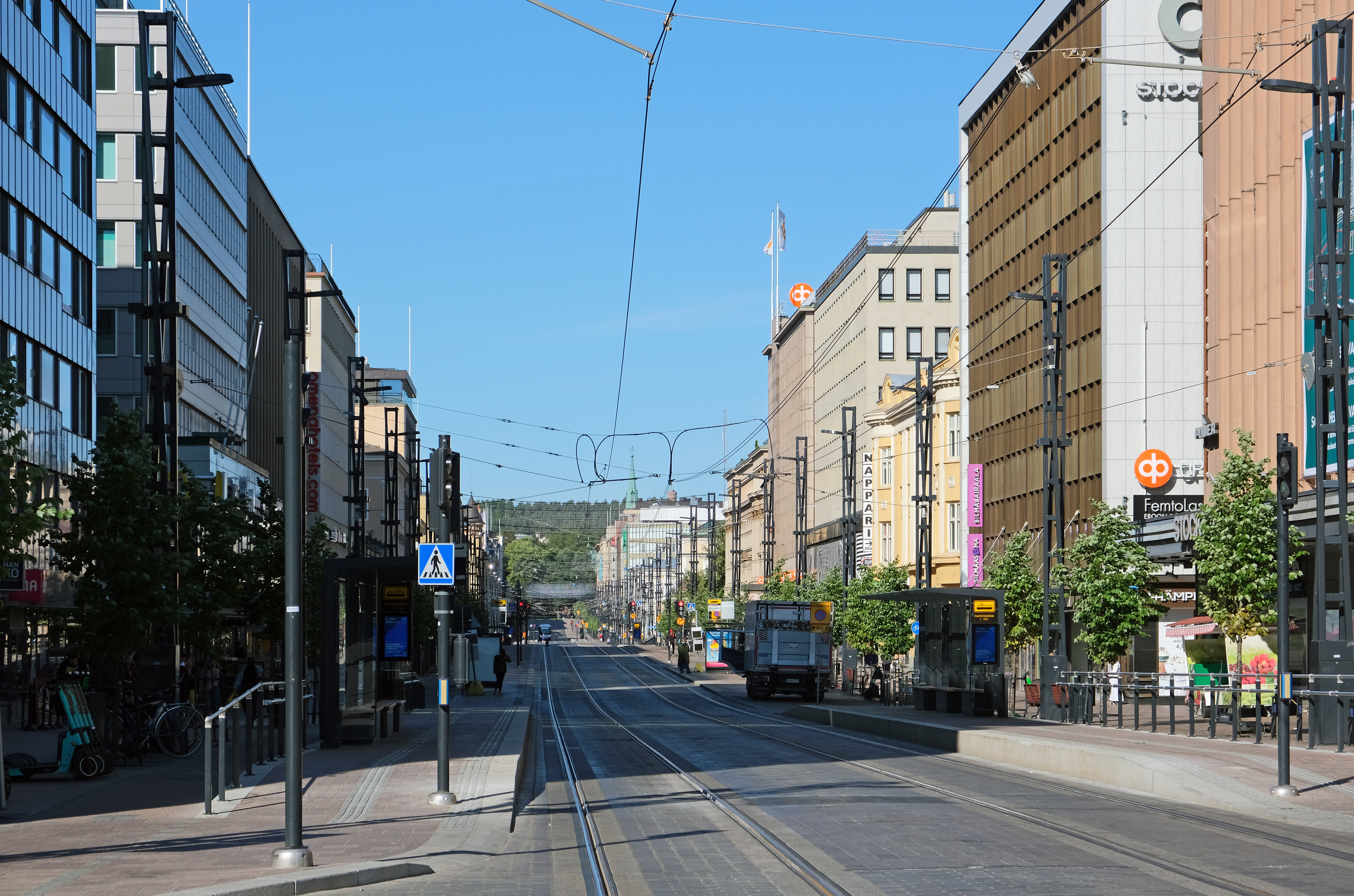
Hämeenkatu as seen from the railway station

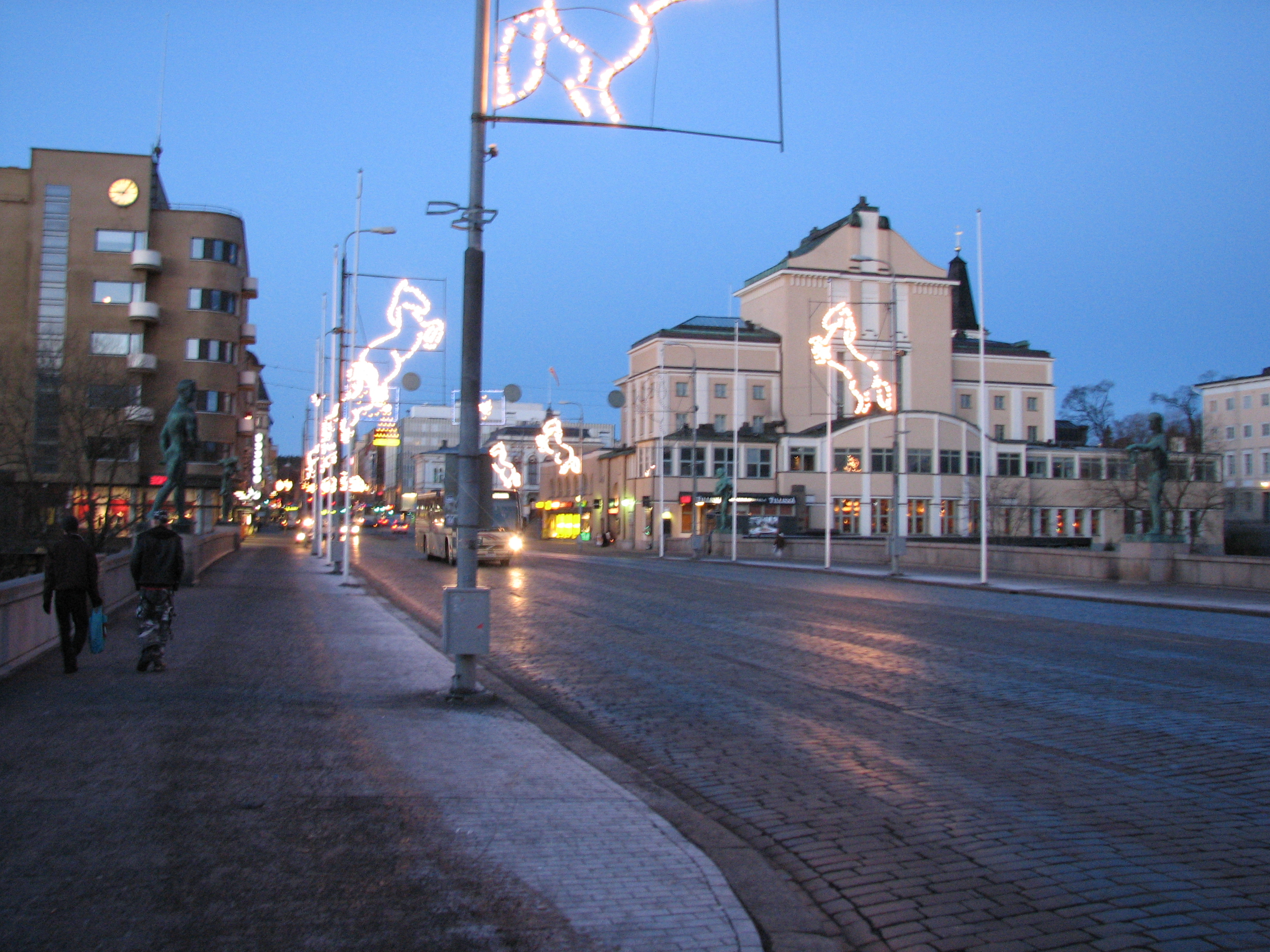
Winter lights

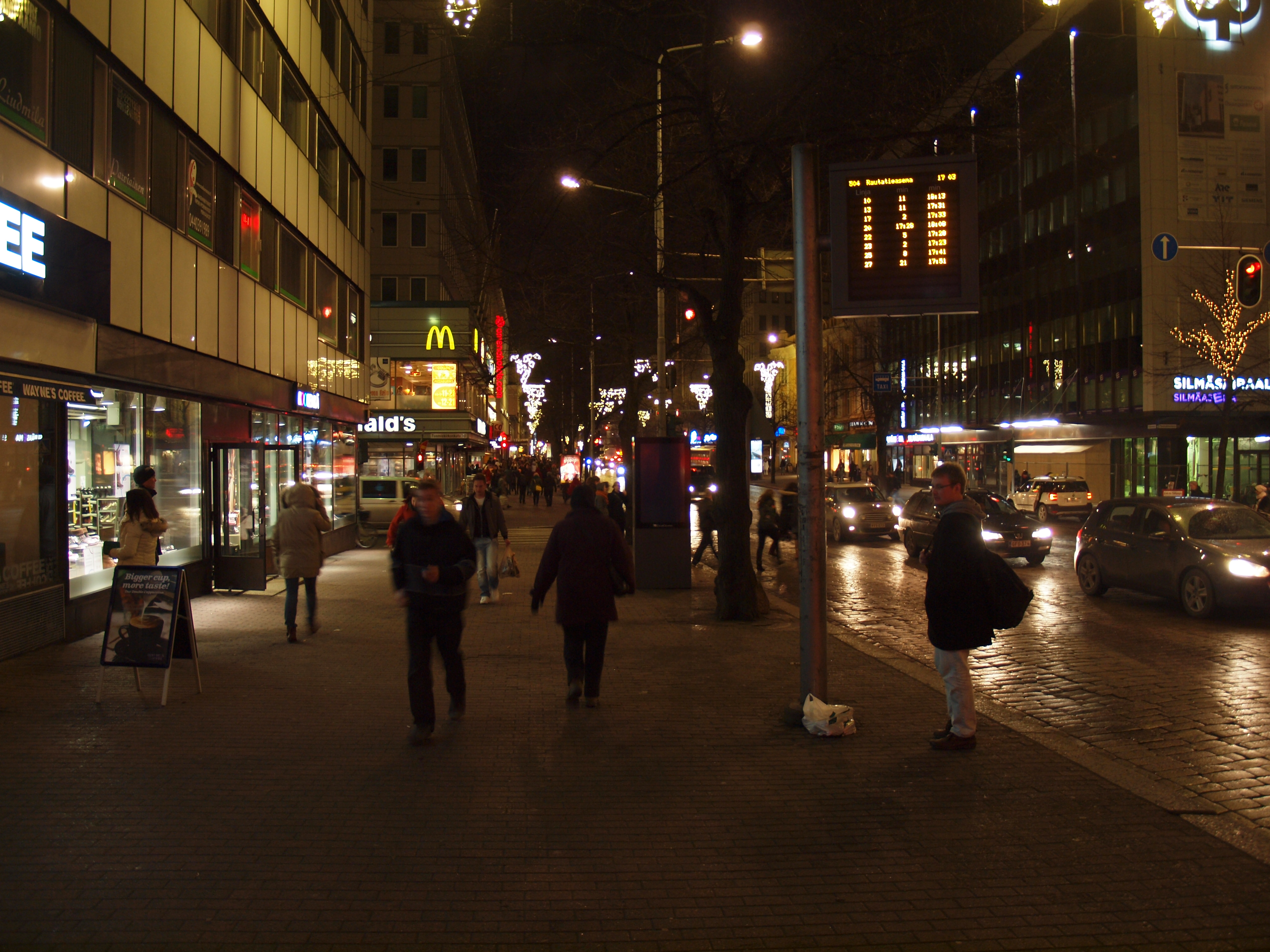
Hämeenkatu in the evening

Hämeenkatu is the main street of Tampere, Finland, located in the city center. The boulevard is roughly a kilometre long, and 28.5 metres (94 ft) wide (driveway and sidewalk) at its widest point.

Hämeenkatu is a boulevard, which begins from the east at the Tampere railway station, continues westward to the Hämeenpuisto park, and is covered with cobble stones for its entire length. The street also contains the Hämeensilta bridge crossing the Tammerkoski rapids with gorgeous views on both sides. The bridge that Hämeenkatu runs across Tammerkoski is decorated with four human statues, one at each corner of the bridge. Of these statues, three represent men and one represents a woman.

Eastwards from the railway station, Hämeenkatu is followed by the 700-metre (2,300 ft)-long Itsenäisyydenkatu, which then diverges into Sammonkatu and Teiskontie. In the west, Hämeenkatu continues first as Pirkankatu and then as Pispalan valtatie.

Construction of the Tampere light rail on the street started in 2017, and in connection to the work, the pedestrian walkways, trees along the street and lighting were renovated and the Hämeensilta bridge was repaired. The Tampere light rail started operating in 2021.

== History ==
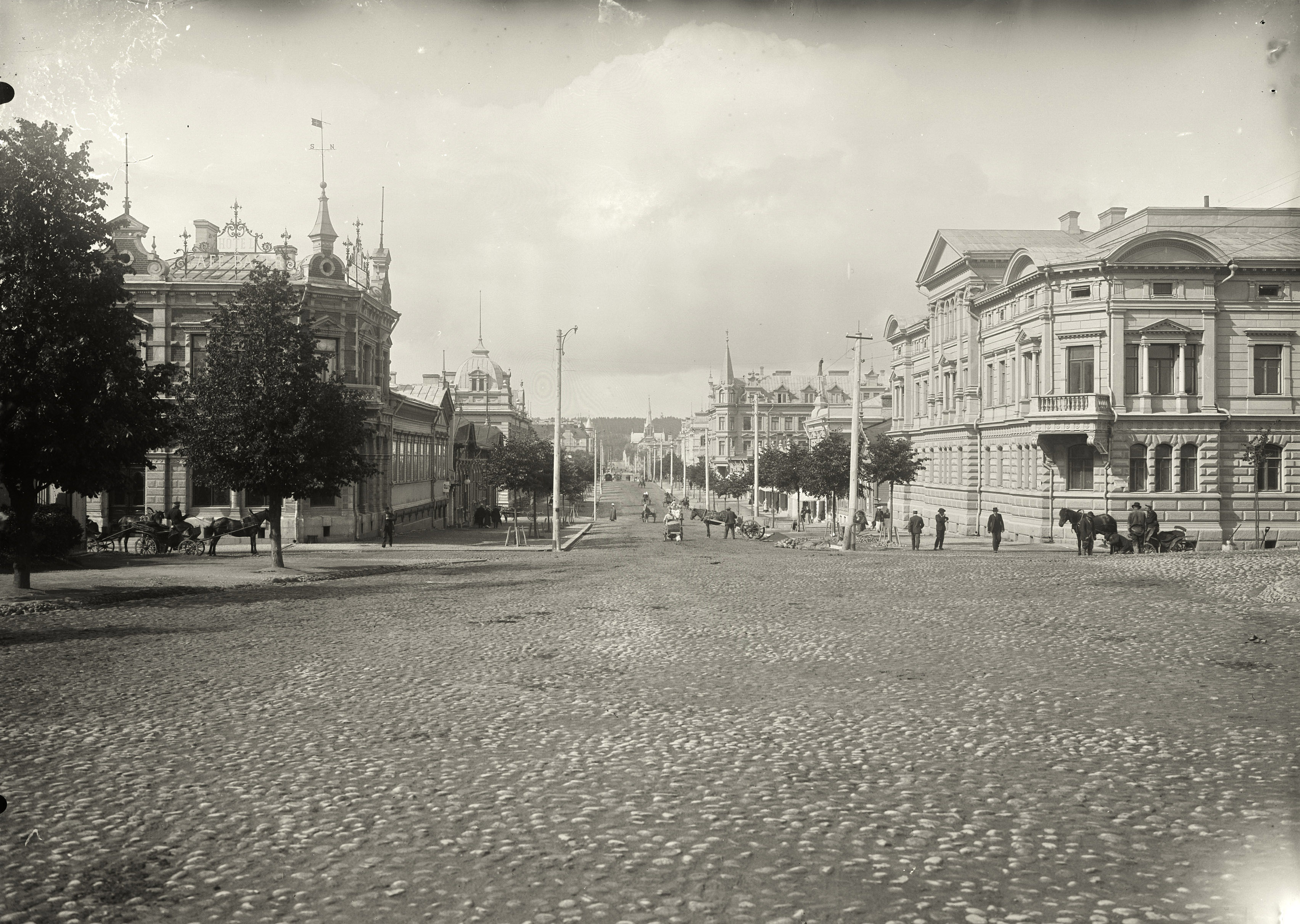
Hämeenkatu in the early 20th century. A view from the railway station to the west. To the left is the Hotel Bauer, to the right is the Railway workers' house.

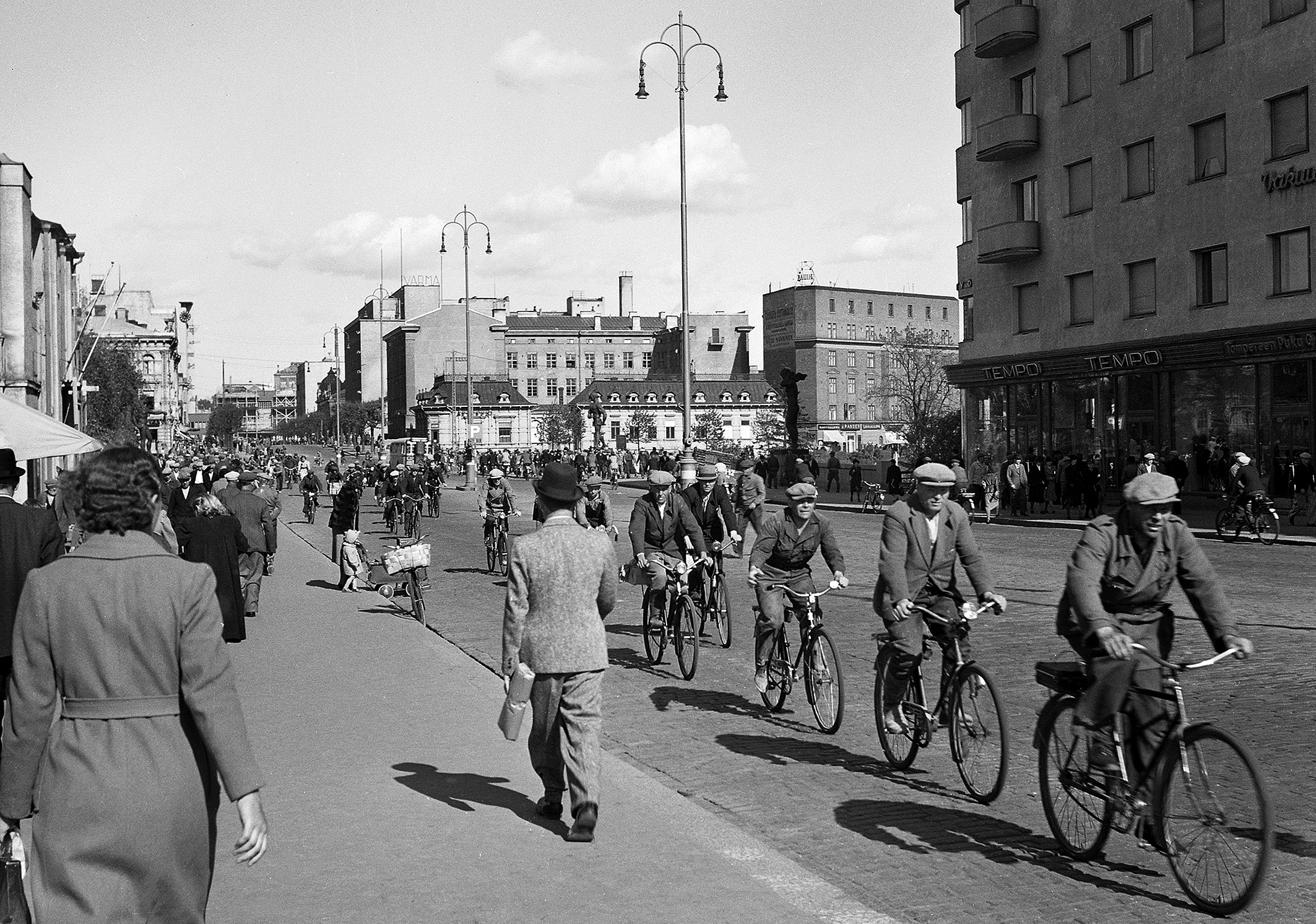
Traffic on Hämeenkatu in summer 1940.

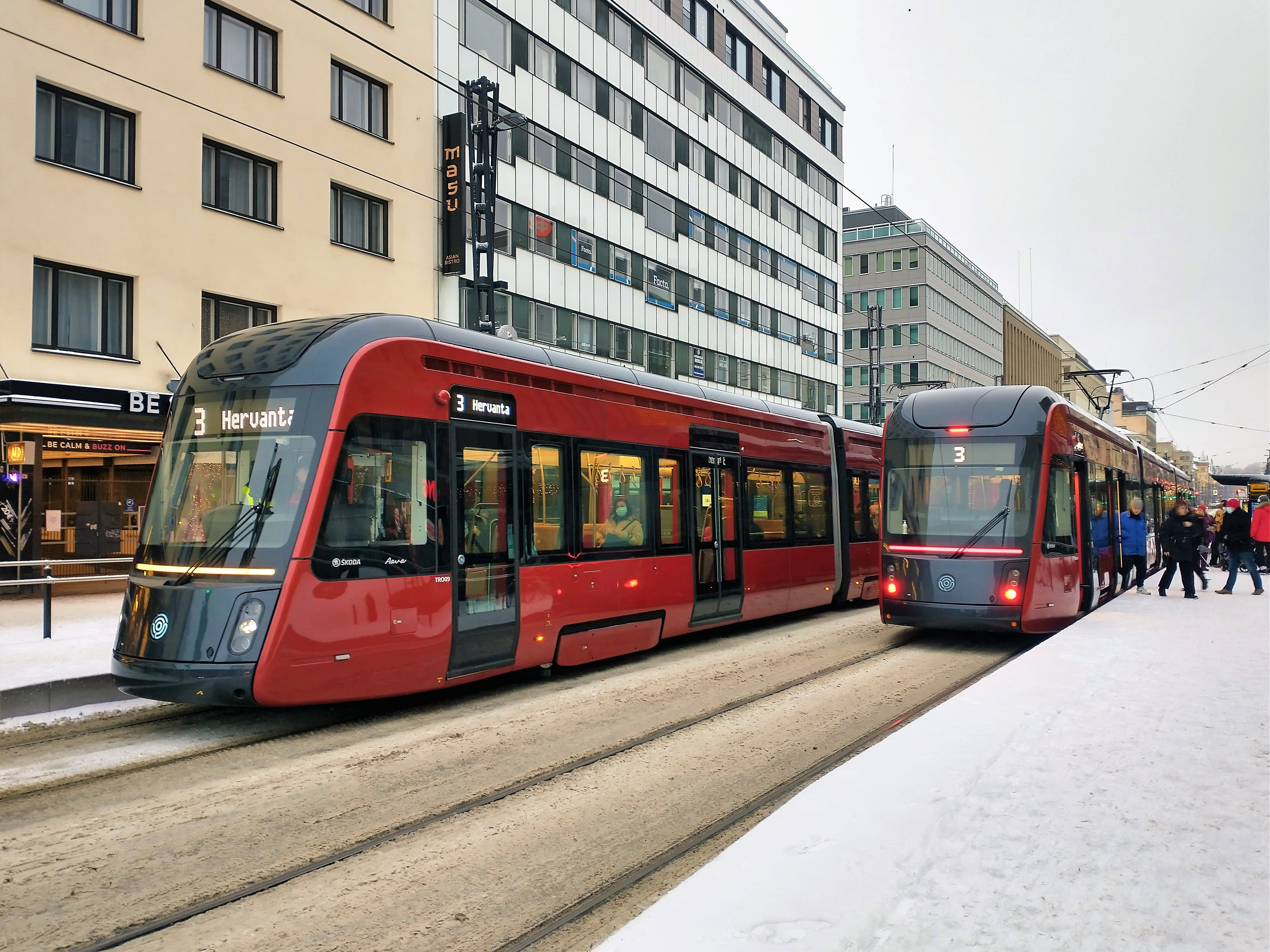
The eastern end of Hämeenkatu was converted into use of public transport only in June 2014. Trams on Hämeenkatu in December 2021.

There originally was an old travel route in the village of Tammerkoski in the locality of Messukylä, located at the place of present-day Tampere, whose route approximately corresponded to the present-day Hämeenkatu. Slightly to the north of the Hämeensilta bridge, at the shallowest point of the rapids, was an ancient crossing point, later the first bridge across Tammerkoski. When Tampere was founded in 1779, the present-day Hämeenkatu was part of the city plan, but the original main street of Tampere was Kauppiaskatu (later known as Kauppakatu), ending at an old wooden bridge in the east. The street Raatihuoneen Poikkikatu, located at the place of present-day Hämeenkatu, was narrower than Hämeenkatu and did not have a bridge. The wooden bridge was renovated many times and the last wooden bridge was built in 1848.

After the 1865 fire of Tampere, the new zoning plan of chief architect Carl Albert Edelfelt in 1868 changed Hämeenkatu to a main street with a width of 30 metres. When the Kyttälä area to the east of Tammerkoski was joined to the city in 1871, Hämeenkatu was expanded with the same width to the east of the rapids. Traffic quickly increased on the wooden bridge, which had also been damaged in the floods. Because of this, the city council made a plan to build a new bridge in 1881. The bridge was built on Hämeenkatu instead of Kauppakatu, as Hämeenkatu had already been widened to serve as the new main street after the fire. The bridge, completed in 1884, was called Isosilta ("Large bridge") in contrast to Pikkusilta ("Little bridge"), located at the place of present-day Satakunnansilta (the "Satakunta Bridge"), which was meant only for pedestrian traffic. When Satakunnansilta was completed in 1900, Isosilta was renamed Hämeensilta.

The intersection with Hatanpään valtatie was built in the 1920 after the Finnish Civil War, when building a highway in the place of houses partly destroyed in the civil war became possible. Planning the construction of the present-day Hämeensilta started in 1923 and the bridge was completed in 1929. In the early 1930s the eastern end of Hämeenkatu was lowered because of the tunnel underneath the railway and the new railway station. From 1948 to 1976 Hämeenkatu had trolleybus traffic.

In June 2014 the eastern end of Hämeenkatu was changed to use public transport only (although private car traffic was allowed for a short time from February to June 2017). This experiment was in preparation for the construction of the Tampere light rail starting in 2017, where Hämeenkatu was fully converted for use of public transport only, and only light traffic, trams, buses, taxis and service traffic are allowed on it. The light rail traffic started in 2021.
