= Teiskontie =

Street in Tampere, Finland

Coordinates: 61°30′10.573″N 23°48′45.626″E

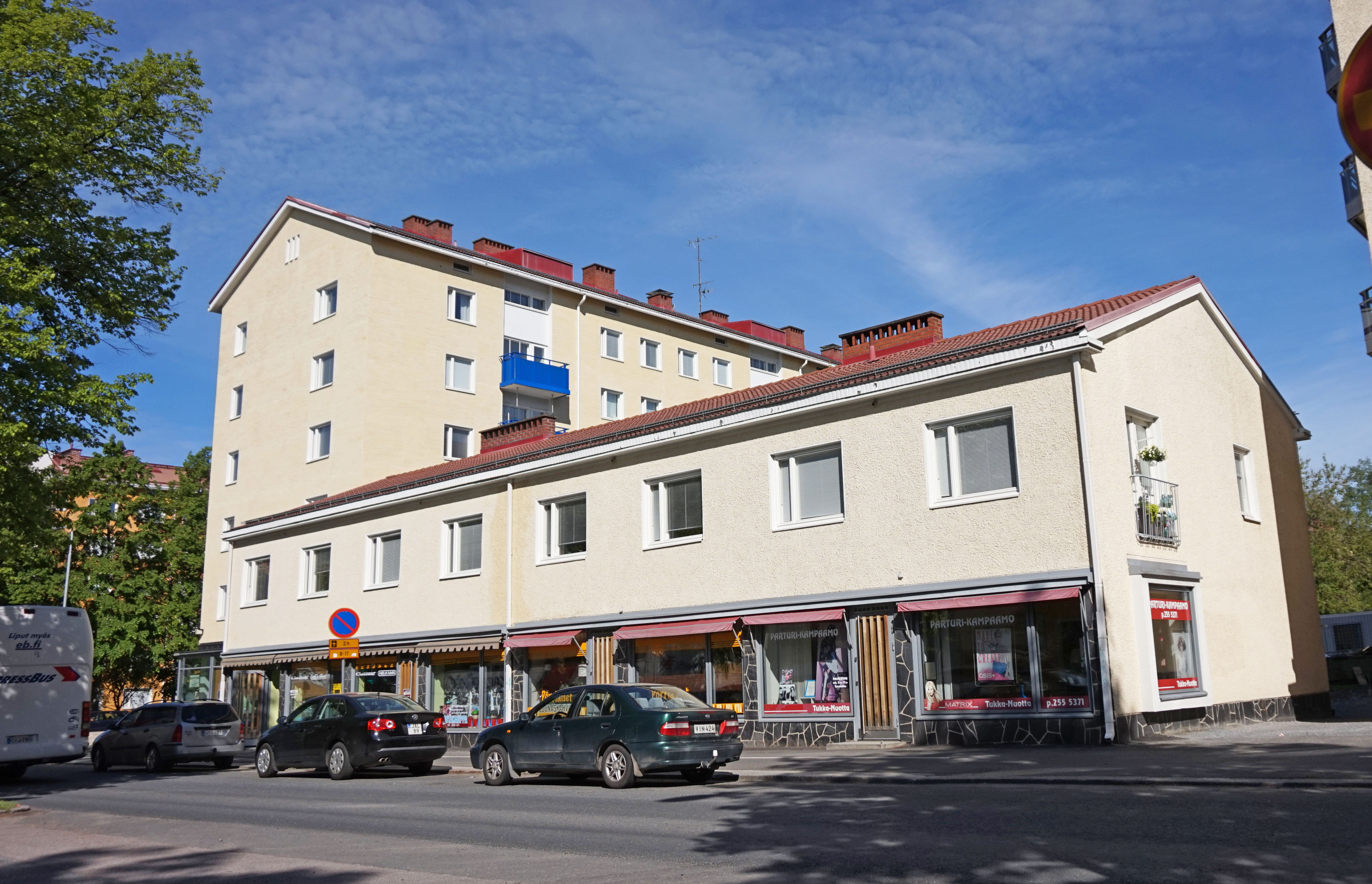
Buildings along Teiskontie at the Kaleva district in Tampere.

Teiskontie is a street and highway in Tampere, Finland. As its name implies, it runs from the center of Tampere towards Teisko, a former municipality connected to Tampere in 1972. To the east of the highway junction of Hervanta, it is part of Highway 12 leading in the direction of Lahti and Kouvola. On the east side of Lake Alasjärvi, Teiskontie has a connection to Highway 9 (E63) leading in the direction of Jyväskylä and Kuopio.

Teiskontie starts at the intersection of Itsenäisyydenkatu, Kalevan puistotie and Sammonkatu in the Liisankallio district. It runs through Kaleva as a wide esplanade with residential apartment buildings and commercial premises. To the east, Teiskontie runs between several districts: Kauppi and Niihama border to the north, Kissanmaa, Ruotula, Takahuhti and Pappila to the south.

The tram leading from the center of Tampere to the University Hospital runs part of the journey on Teiskontie and there are two stops along it. Tram traffic began in August 2021.

== See also ==
- Paasikiven–Kekkosentie
