= Tampere Opera =

Opera house in Tampere, Finland

Coordinates: 61°29′44″N 23°46′48″E

The Tampere Opera, established in 1946, is an opera house based in Tampere, Finland. The opera is run by guest artists. Their orchestra is the Tampere Filharmonia. The choir is composed of 80 singers and is led by Heikki Liimola.

The first visit abroad of Tampere Opera was in 2005, when they visited the National Theatre in Prague.
