= Hannu Lintu =

Finnish conductor (born 1967)

Hannu Petteri Lintu (born 13 October 1967) is a Finnish conductor.

== Early life and education ==
Lintu was born in Rauma, the son of Johannes Lintu, an electrical engineer, and his wife Lilja Lintu (née Toivonen), a photographer. He studied piano and cello at the Turku Conservatory and at the Sibelius Academy. He also studied conducting with Atso Almila, and later with Jorma Panula and Eri Klas. He took part in conducting master classes with Ilya Musin. Lintu won the Nordic Conducting Competition in 1994 in Bergen. He graduated from the Sibelius Academy in 1996 with honours. Lintu took up a part-time appointment as a professor of conducting at the Sibelius Academy in September 2014.

== Career ==
From 1998 to 2001, Lintu was chief conductor of the Turku Philharmonic Orchestra. In 2005, he served as the artistic director for the Summer Sounds Festival of the Finnish contemporary music ensemble Avanti!. Lintu was chief conductor of the Tampere Philharmonic Orchestra from 2009 to 2013. In December 2010, the Finnish Radio Symphony Orchestra announced the appointment of Lintu as its eighth chief conductor, effective 1 August 2013, with an initial contract of three seasons. He held the title of principal guest conductor with the orchestra for the 2012–2013 season. In April 2016, the FRSO announced the extension of Lintu's contract as chief conductor through 2021. Lintu stood down as chief conductor of the orchestra at the close of the 2020–2021 season.

In May 2019, Finnish National Opera and Ballet announced the appointment of Lintu as its next chief conductor, with a contract effective from 1 January 2022 to 30 June 2026. His chief conductorship of Finnish National Opera and Ballet formally began in August 2021. In January 2024, the Lahti Symphony Orchestra announced the appointment of Lintu as its new artistic partner, effective in the autumn of 2025. Lintu concluded his tenure with Finnish National Opera and Ballet at the close of the 2025-2026 season.

Outside of Finland, Lintu was chief conductor and artistic director of the Helsingborg Symphony Orchestra from 2002 to 2005. Lintu first conducted Ireland's RTÉ National Symphony Orchestra in January 2009. On the basis of that appearance, he was named principal guest conductor of the RTÉ National Symphony Orchestra, effective with the 2010-2011 season. He held this RTÉ post through May 2013. In November 2022, the Gulbenkian Orchestra announced the appointment of Lintu as its next chief conductor, effective with the 2023-2024 season. In May 2026, the Gulbenkian Orchestra announced the extension of Lintu's contract as its chief conductor through 2030.

Lintu first guest-conducted the Singapore Symphony Orchestra in 2017. In January 2025, the Singapore Symphony Orchestra announced the appointment of Lintu as its next music director, effective with the 2026–2027 season, with an initial contract of three seasons.

Lintu has conducted commercial recordings for such labels as Claves, Dacapo, Danacord, Hyperion, Naxos, and Ondine.

== Personal life ==
Lintu resides in Helsinki.

Cultural offices
Preceded by Jacques Mercier	Chief Conductor, Turku Philharmonic Orchestra; 1998–2001	Succeeded by Tibor Bogányi
Preceded by Okko Kamu	Chief Conductor, Helsingborg Symphony Orchestra; 2002–2005	Succeeded by Andrew Manze
Preceded by John Storgårds	Chief Conductor, Tampere Philharmonic Orchestra; 2009–2013	Succeeded by Santtu-Matias Rouvali
Preceded by Sakari Oramo	Chief Conductor, Finnish Radio Symphony Orchestra; 2013–2021	Succeeded by Nicholas Collon
Preceded by Michael Güttler	Chief Conductor, Finnish National Opera and Ballet; 2021–2026	Succeeded by Dima Slobodeniouk
Preceded by Lorenzo Viotti	Chief Conductor, Gulbenkian Orchestra; 2023–present	Succeeded by incumbent
Preceded by Hans Graf	Music Director, Singapore Symphony Orchestra; 2026–present	Succeeded by incumbent
