= Jaakko Tähtinen =

Finnish architect (1904–1970)

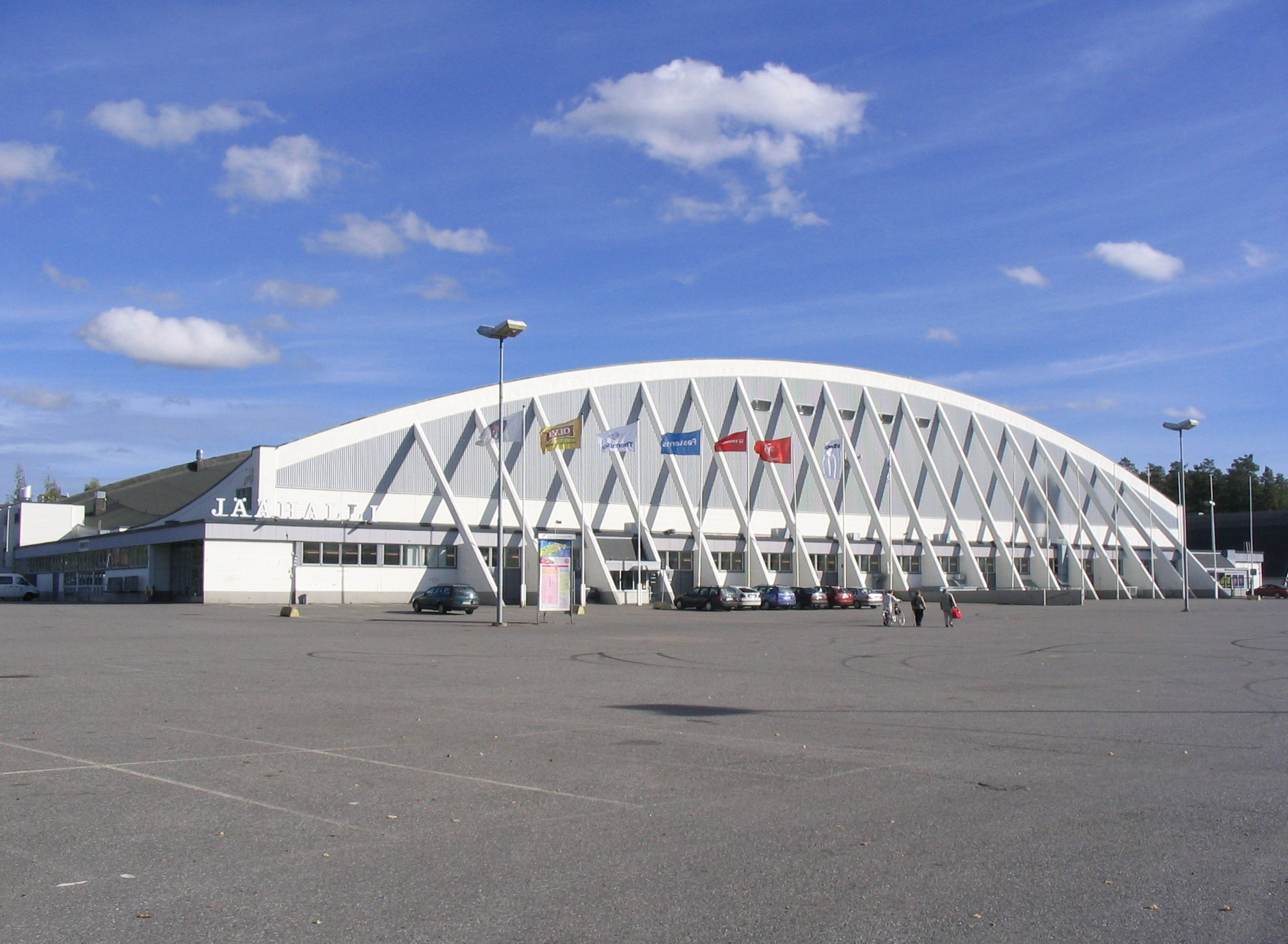
Hakametsä ice rink and sports arena, Tampere, Finland

Jaakko Tähtinen (1904–1970) was a Finnish architect based in Tampere, a large city in southern Finland. He established the Tähtinen architectural practice and designed both residential and commercial buildings in Tampere and also in other cities including Kuopio.

His most notable work was the Hakametsä ice rink and sports arena in Tampere, built for the 1965 Ice Hockey World Championships.

== Major works ==
- 1931 Pyynikintori 8
- 1934 Puistolinna (Hämeenpuisto 18) – Park Castle
- 1938 Turvantalo (Hämeenkatu 25) – Security House
- 1938 Suomen Yhdyspankintalo (Hämeenkatu 24)
- 1938 The Metsäkansa Village Church, Valkeakoski
- 1941 SMK:n pääkonttori (Hämeenkatu 7) – SMK's headquarters
- 1954 Ahdinkadun-Omakadun talot Petsamossa
- 1965 Hakametsän jäähalli – Hakametsä ice rink, Tampere
