= Sammonkatu =

Street in Tampere, Finland

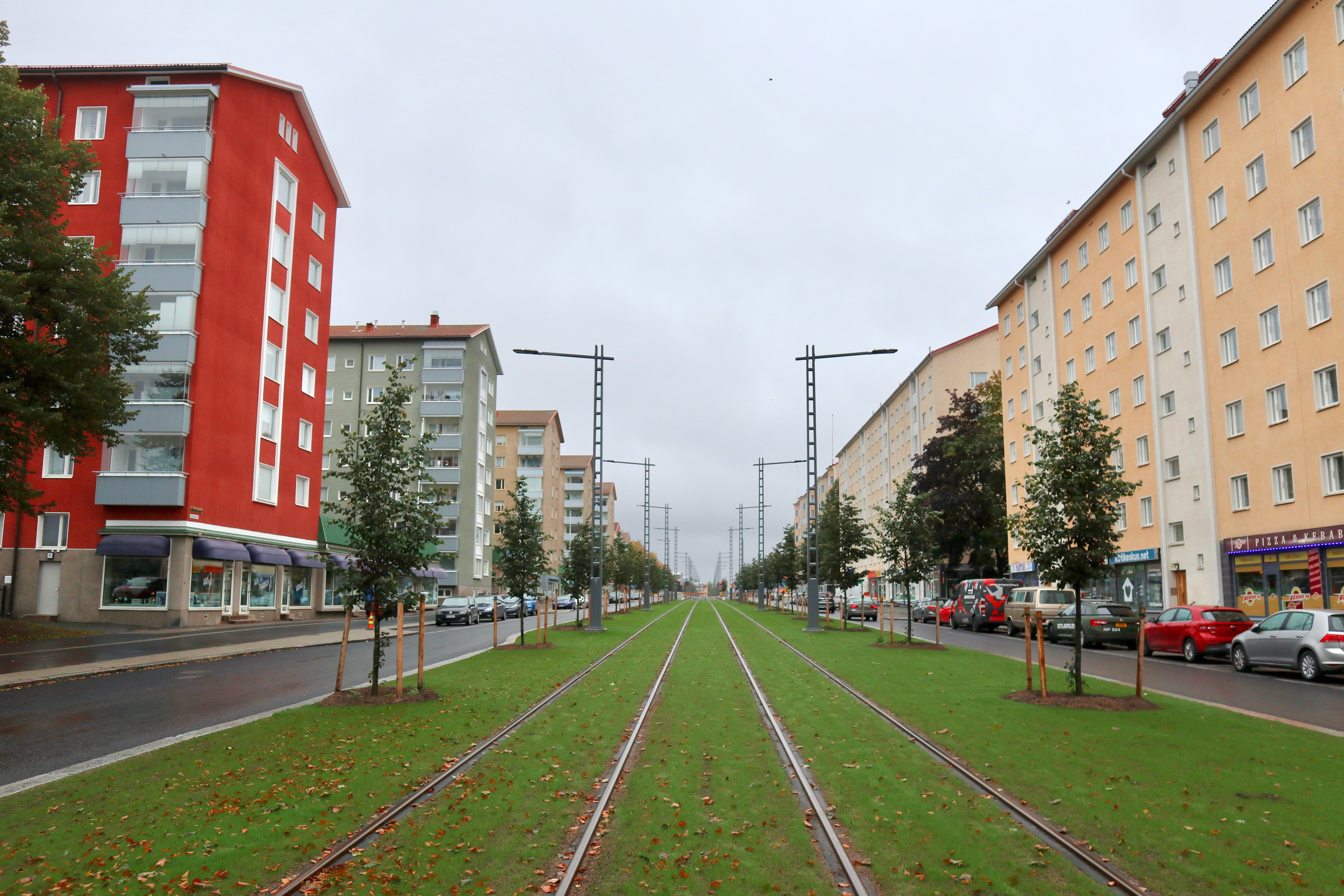
Tampere light rail track along Sammonkatu in Kaleva

Sammonkatu is a wide park street in the Kaleva district in Tampere, Finland. It starts at the intersection of Itsenäisyydenkatu (formerly known as Puolimatkankatu) and Teiskontie (formerly Teiskonkatu). The street is part of Kaleva's nationally significant built cultural environment. Along it is, among other things, Sampola, a public building with Sampola Library and Tammerkoski High School.

The name Sammonkatu is based on the Finnish epic poetry, the Kalevala, like many other street names in the area. In the ancient poems of the Kalevala, Sampo is a mythical artifact that generates wealth.

== Light rail ==
The light rail from the center of Tampere to Hervanta runs on a grass track in the middle of Sammonkatu. Tram traffic started in 2021.

== See also ==
- Hämeenkatu
- Kalevanrinne
- Liisankallio
- Teiskontie
