= Tampere Philharmonic Orchestra =

Finnish orchestra

- Symphony orchestra
- Native name: Tampere Filharmonia
- Founded: 1930; 96 years ago
- Location: Tampere, Finland
- Concert hall: Tampere Hall
- Principal conductor: Matthew Halls
- Website: Official website

The Tampere Philharmonic Orchestra (Finnish:Tampere Filharmonia) is a Finnish orchestra based in Tampere. Founded in 1930, and maintained by the municipality of Tampere since 1947, the orchestra is currently based in the Tampere Hall. The orchestra collaborates with the Tampere Opera and Tampere Ballet and regularly participates in the Tampere Biennale music festival.

== History ==
In 1929, the Tampere Music Board decided to establish a local orchestra, and entrusted the task of assembling the musicians to Elias Kiianmies, who became the orchestra's first chief conductor. The ensemble, first named the Tampereen Orkesteri (Tampere Orchestra) and consisting of 34 musicians, gave its first performance on January 6, 1930 in the Tampere Town Hall. In the spring of 1932, Eero Kosonen became chief conductor of the orchestra, and held the post for a record 37 years. In 1947, the municipality took over the orchestra, renaming it the Tampereen Kaupunginorkesteri (Tampere City Orchestra). Under the new name, the orchestra gave its first performance on January 9.

During the 1970s, the number of musicians increased to 59. In 1974, the orchestra released its first record, Kalevi Aho's Symphony No. 4. Since then, 40 recordings have been released locally and internationally, on such labels as Finlandia and Ondine. As a part of its 50th anniversary celebrations, the orchestra made its first international tour, visiting Stockholm and Norrköping in Sweden. The orchestra first toured the United States in 1987.

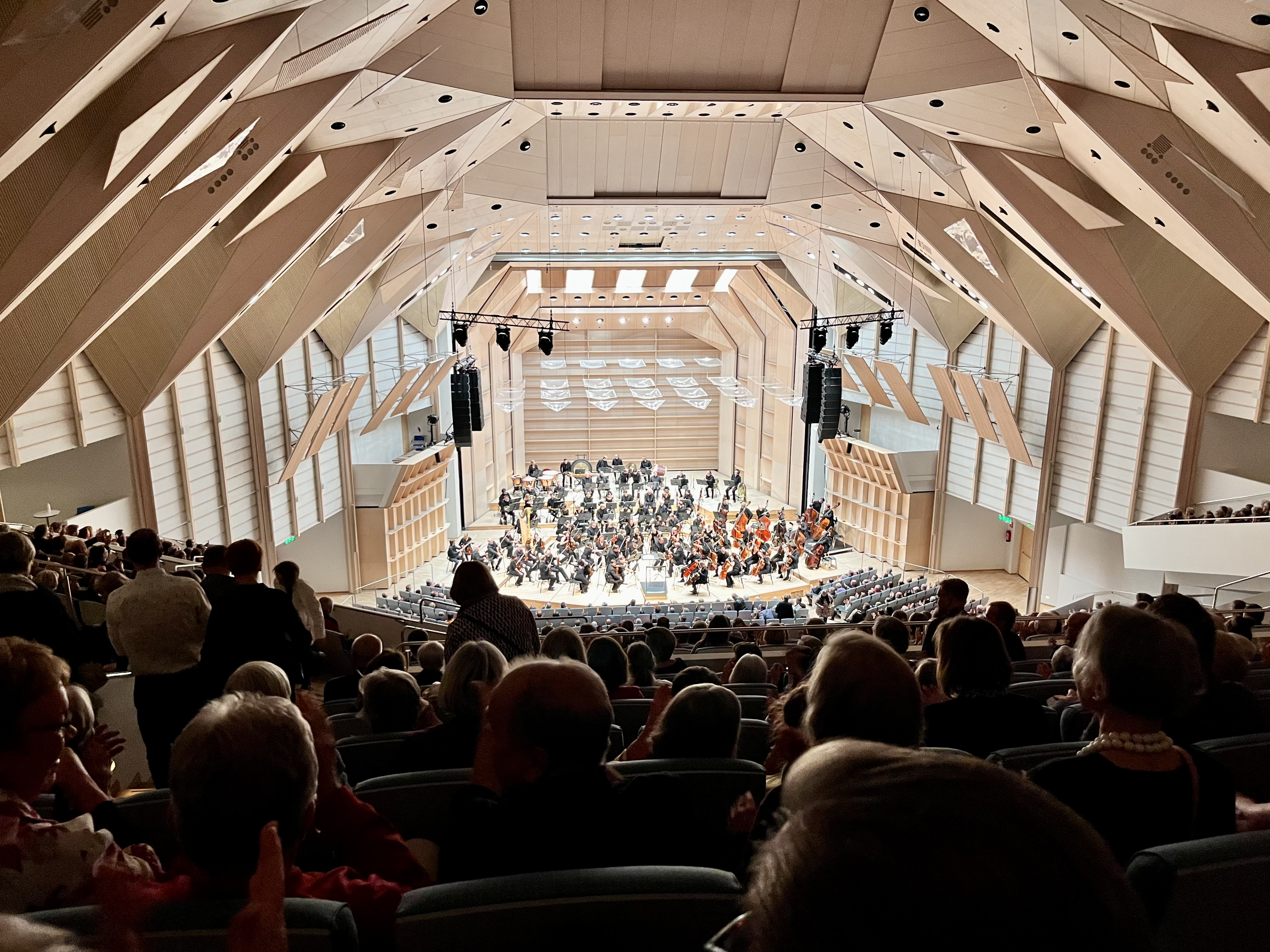
The main auditorium of Tampere Hall after a concert.

In 1990, the Soviet-born American Leonid Grin became the orchestra's first chief conductor from outside of Finland. The orchestra relocated to the new 1756-seat Tampere Hall. In 1998, Eri Klas became the orchestra's chief conductor, and held the post until 2006. Klas had the title of conductor laureate of the orchestra until his death in 2016.

The orchestra received its current name in 2002. The size of the orchestra continued to increase and reached 97 musicians in 2005, thus becoming the only full-scale Finnish symphony orchestra outside Helsinki. With the start of the 2013-2014 season, the orchestra's chief conductor is Santtu-Matias Rouvali, who first guest-conducted the orchestra in January 2010. He subsequently returned as a guest conductor in December 2011. In September 2012, the orchestra announced Rouvali's appointment as chief conductor, effective with the 2012-2013 season, with an initial contract of 3 years. Following contract extensions with the orchestra, in April 2022, the orchestra announced that Rouvali is to conclude his chief conductorship at the close of the 2022-2023 season.

In February 2022, Matthew Halls first guest-conducted the orchestra. In September 2022, the orchestra announced the appointment of Halls as its next chief conductor, effective with the 2023-2024 season, with an initial contract of 3 years. In June 2025, the orchestra announced a one-year extension of Halls' contract through the 2026-2027 season. Halls is scheduled to conclude his tenure with the orchestra at the close of the 2026-2027 season. In June 2026, the orchestra announced the appointment of Kristian Sallinen as its next chief conductor and artistic director, effective with the 2027-2028 season, with an initial contract of three years.

The orchestra has educational programmes aimed at children and youth, and is the first Finnish orchestra with a young listeners' club. Outside of classical music, the orchestra participated in the recording of the power metal album Vendetta by the Finnish band Celesty. They have also collaborated with such rock bands and musicians as Eppu Normaali and Steve Vai.

== Chief conductors ==
- Elias Kiianmies (1930–1932)
- Eero Kosonen (1932–1968)
- Juhani Raiskinen (1969–1973)
- Jouko Saari (1973–1974)
- Paavo Rautio (1974–1987)
- Atso Almila (1987–1989)
- Ari Rasilainen (1989–1990)
- Leonid Grin (1990–1994)
- Tuomas Ollila (1994–1998)
- Eri Klas (1998–2006)
- John Storgårds (2006–2009)
- Hannu Lintu (2009–2013)
- Santtu-Matias Rouvali (2013–2023)
- Matthew Halls (2023–present)
