= Tulli, Tampere =

City district in Tampere, Finland

Coordinates: 61°29′49″N 23°46′44″E

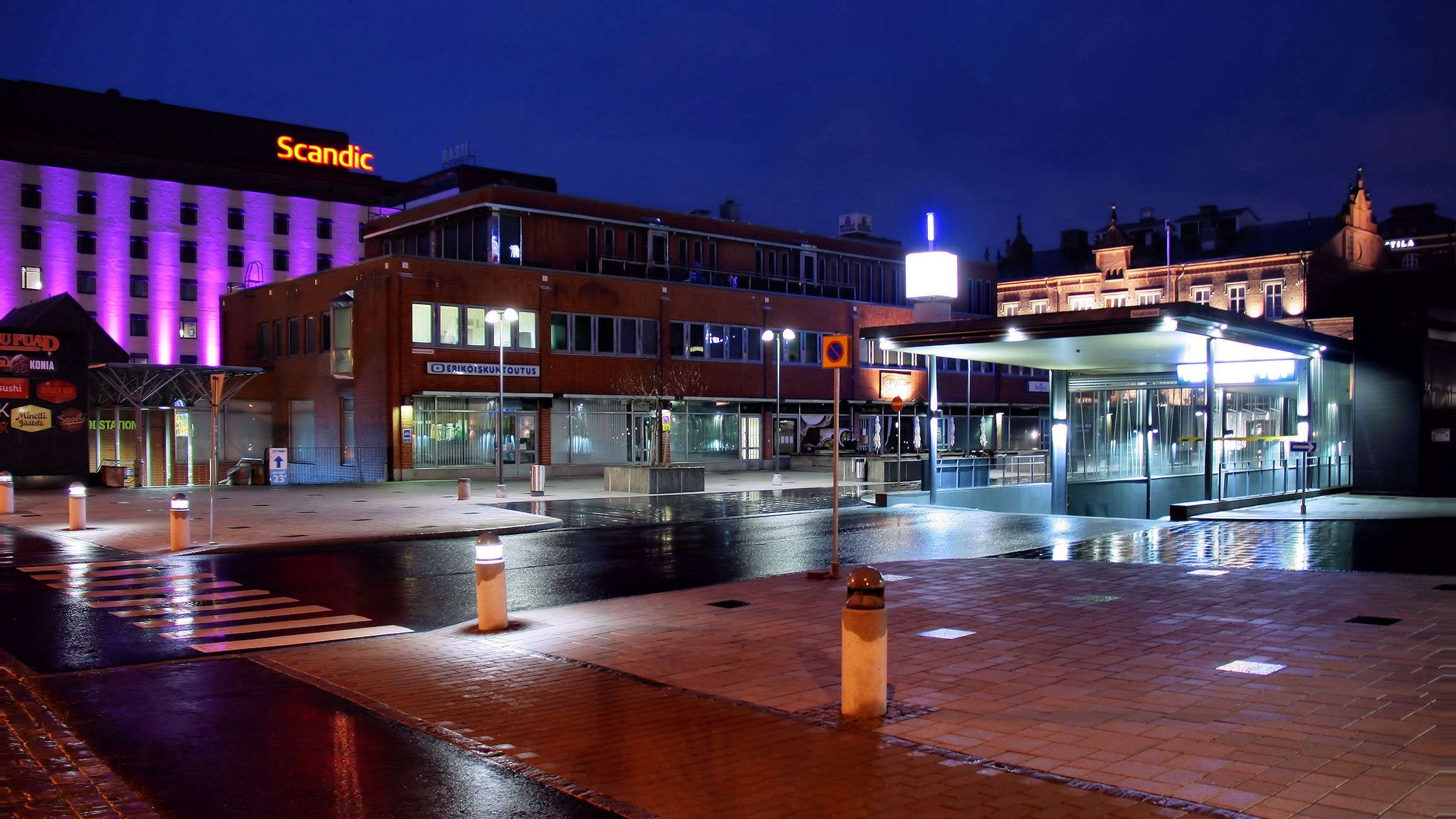
Tulli at the Ratapihankatu street

Tulli (Finnish pronunciation: [ˈtulːi]) is a district in the center of Tampere, Finland. It takes its name from the Customs House (Tullikamari) completed in 1901 and the associated Pakkahuone packing house. Due to the proximity of the railway yard, storage, office and production facilities were built in the area from the end of the 19th century. A town plan was established for the area in 1900.

Tulli's area houses the premises of the University of Tampere, small industry, the Tullintori shopping center and, to an increasing extent, also settlements. The Customs House and Pakkahuone have restaurant and cultural activities. The northern boundary of Tulli is the Itsenäisyydenkatu street and in the north-south direction it is split by the Yliopistonkatu street. On the eastern edge of the district is the popular recreation area of the eastern center, the Sorsapuisto park, on the southern edge of which is the large concert and congress center, Tampere Hall, completed in 1990. In the western part of Tulli, on the edge of the railway yard and Ratapihankatu, is the tallest hotel building in both Tampere and Finland, Hotel Torni. A new high-rise building, the Tulli Tower (Tullin torni), is planned about 150 meters south of Hotel Torni.

== Sources ==
- Koskesta voimaa -verkkojulkaisu: Tullin alue – XVII kaupunginosa (in Finnish)
