= Liisankallio =

City district in Tampere, Finland

Coordinates: 61°29′57″N 23°47′25″E

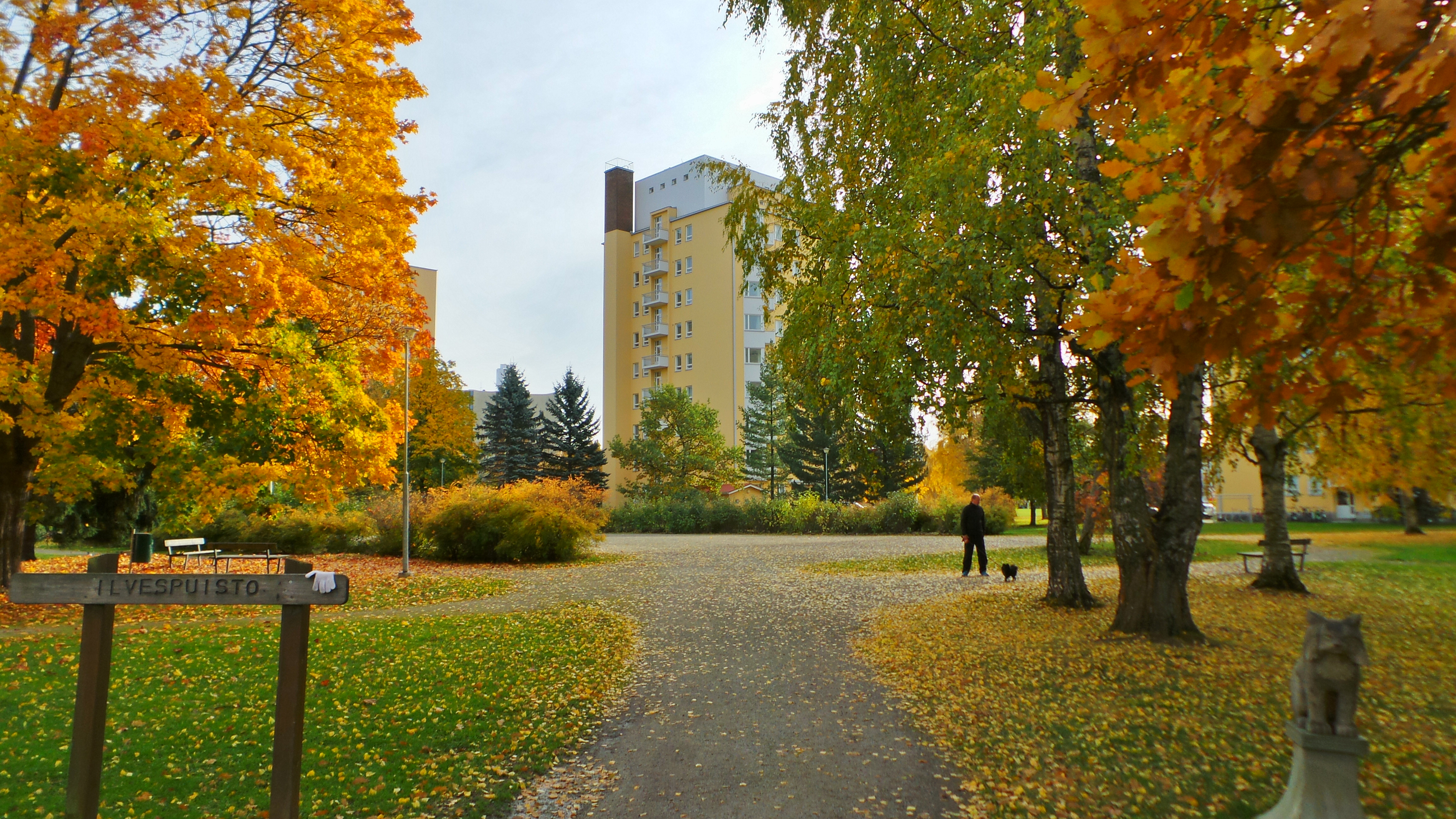
Ilvespuisto ("Lynx Park") in Liisankallio

Liisankallio is a district of Tampere, Finland. The district, formerly known as Tammelan vainio ("Tammela Field"), is located east of the Tammela and Tulli districts. To the north is the Petsamo district, to the east are Kaleva and Kalevanrinne, to the south is Kalevanharju. When we often talk about Kaleva, we mean a larger entity formed by Liisankallio, Kaleva and Kalevanrinne.

The district got its current name according to the high Liisankallio located in the area in the 1940s. The place is also called Liisanmäki, and the older name of the hill is Hällinmäki. The origin of the names is unknown. The town plan of the area was confirmed in 1940.

Kaalamonaukio in the Liisankallio district is named after the architect Elis Kaalamo (1885–1946). Kaalamo was the first town plan architect in Tampere in 1929–1946.

Sammonaukio in front of Kaleva Church and the Sammonkatu street, southeast of it, are associated with the Kalevala-themed names of the Liisankallio and Kaleva districts. In Finnish ancient poetry, Sampo is a wealth-producing artifact.
