= Tampere Hall =

Concert hall and congress centre in Tampere, Finland

- Finnish: Tampere-talo; Swedish: Tammerforshuset
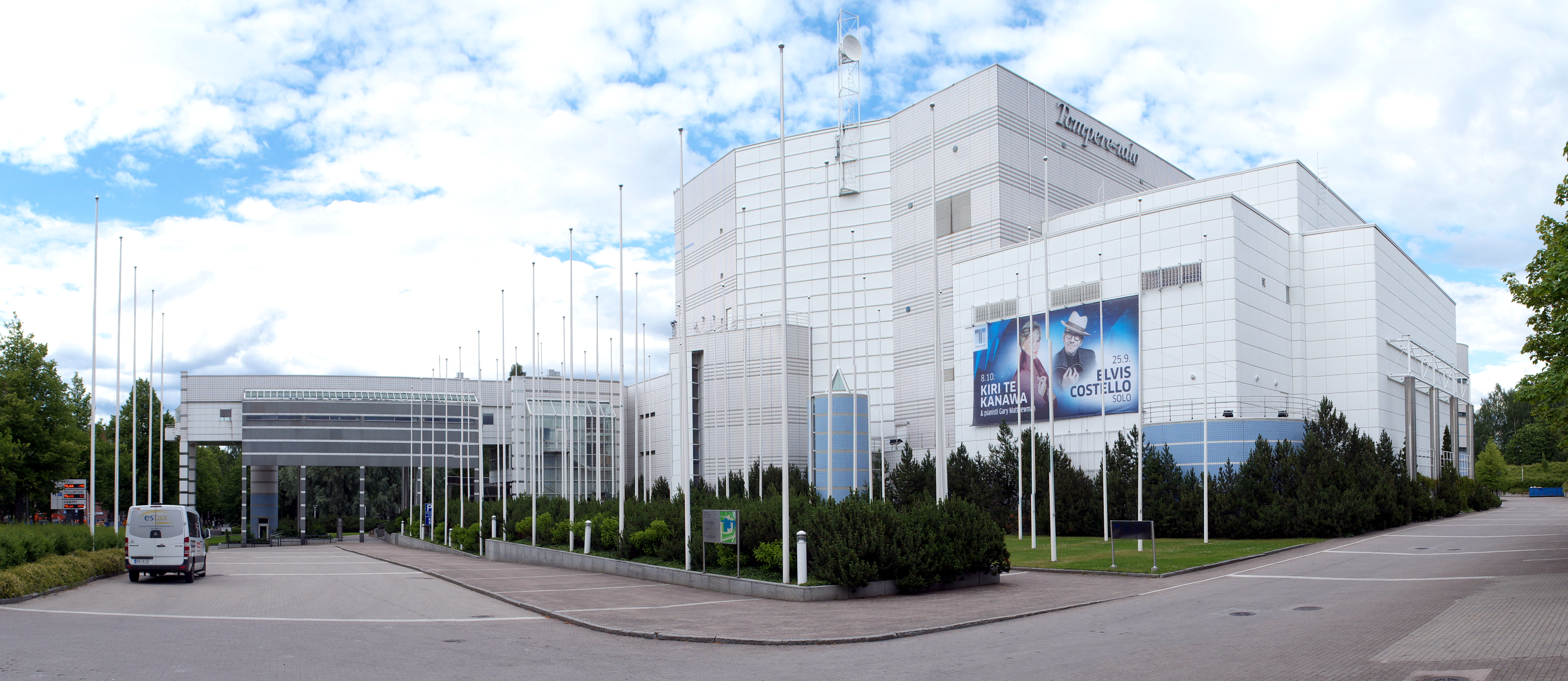
- Tampere Hall in June 2014

- Location within Finland

General information
- Architectural style: Postmodernism
- Location: Sorsapuisto
- Coordinates: 61°29′45″N 23°46′55″E
- Completed: 29 September 1990
- Owner: City of Tampere

Technical details
- Floor area: 31,718 m^{2} (341,410 sq ft)

Design and construction
- Architects: Sakari Aartelo and Esa Piironen
- Main contractor: A. Puolimatka Oy & YIT

The Tampere Hall (Finnish: Tampere-talo; Swedish: Tammerforshuset) is the largest congress centre in the Nordic countries, located in the southern edge of Sorsapuisto, in the centre of Tampere, Finland. It was inaugurated on September 29, 1990. Opposite of the Tampere Hall is the main building of the University of Tampere, and the Tampere railway station is only half a kilometre away. The seating capacity of the main auditorium is 1,756.

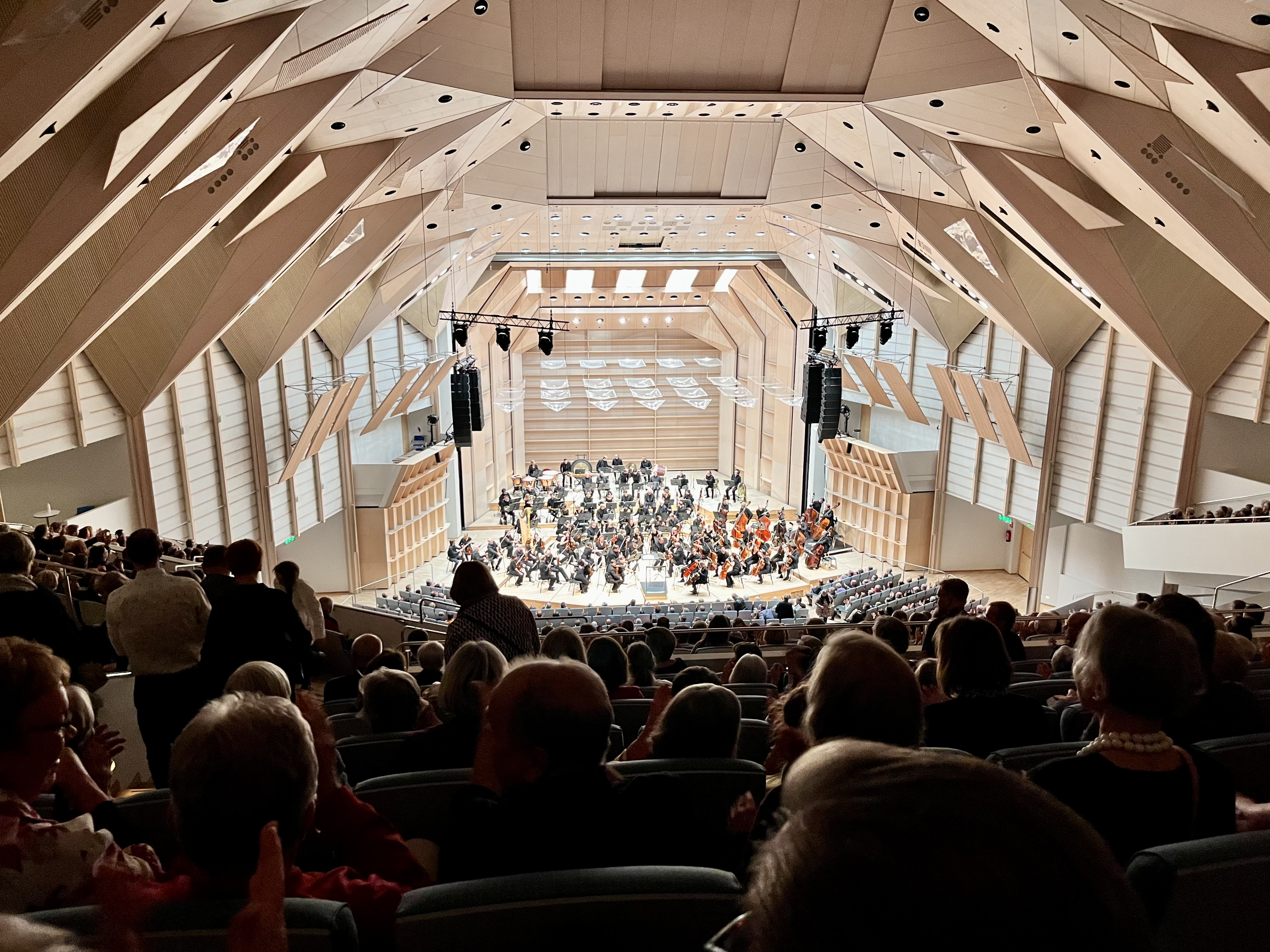
The main auditorium

Due to its central location, Tampere Hall hosts many small fairs and conventions, including the first ever Finncon in Tampere. The event with the largest number of visitors to Tampere Hall is Tracon, the annual role-playing and anime cosplay event. The Tampere Opera and the Tampere Philharmonic Orchestra are also based there.

The managing director of the Tampere Hall is Paulina Ahokas. Kalervo Kummola served as the managing director from 2004 to 2011. Previous managing directors have included Carl Öhman, and Kaarina Suonio.

As of the year 2015, the Tampere Hall has been chosen as the best congress venue in Finland seven times. In 2017, the Moomin Museum moved into the complex.
