= Kaleva (Tampere) =

City district in Tampere, Finland

Coordinates: 61°29′50″N 23°48′0″E

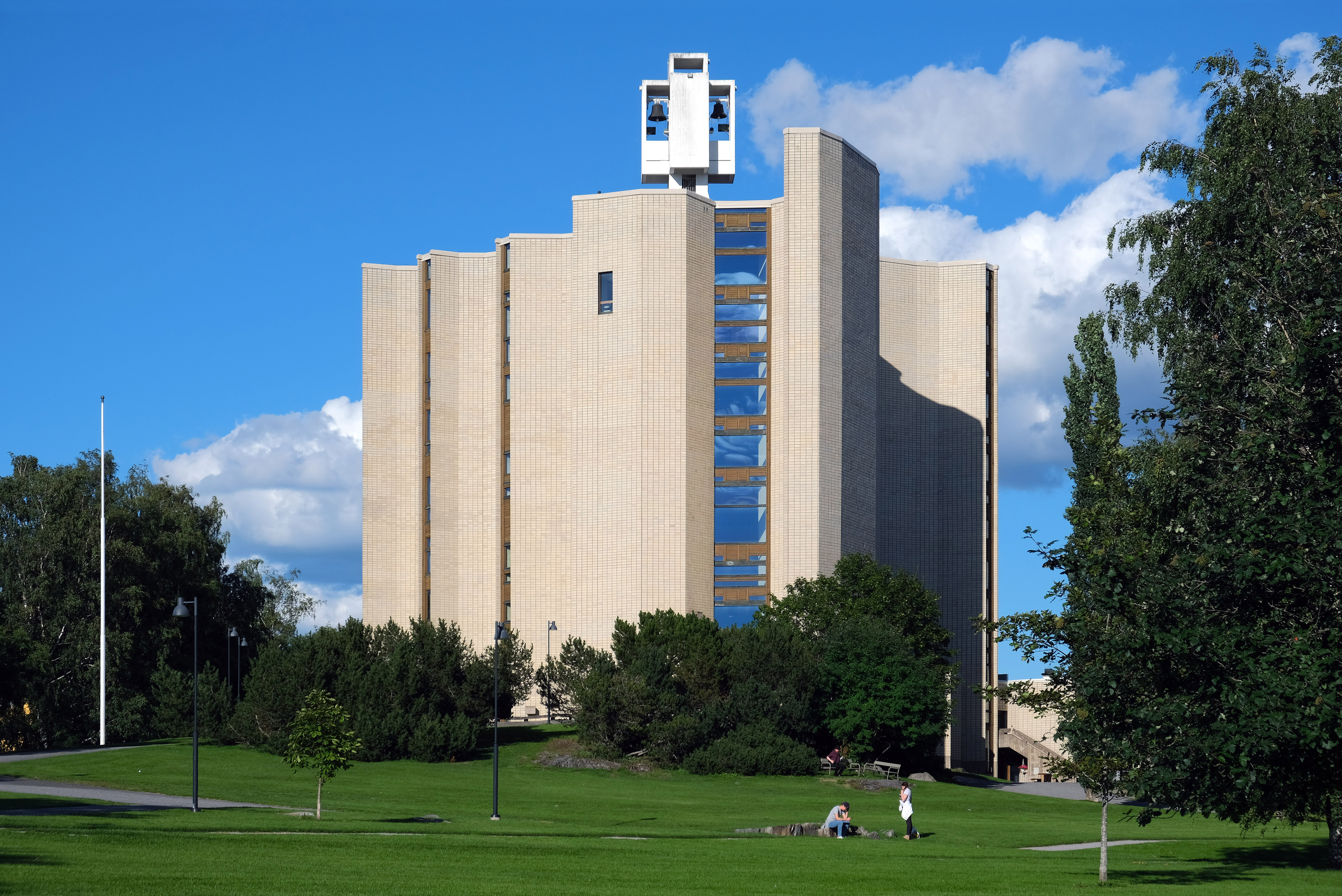
The Kaleva Church

Kaleva is an eastern part of the city of Tampere, Finland, located south of the Kauppi district. It is part of larger Sampo district. The population of Kaleva is approximately 10,000 (2005).

The most notable landmark is the Kaleva Church built between 1959 and 1966, and located in the Liisankallio district.

Kaleva has many educational institutions, the folk high school Sampola and vocational school of economics, two high schools (lukio); Kalevan lukio and Sammon keskuslukio, and two comprehensive schools. It's also the home of the biggest swimming hall in Tampere.

Most locals are students from Tampere University or pensioners. In 2007 Kaleva topped being the most poor part of the town.

One of the notable residents of Kaleva is Sanna Marin, the former Prime Minister of Finland.

== See also ==
- Kalevankangas Cemetery
