= Tampere light rail =

Light rail system in Tampere, Finland

Tampere Tram
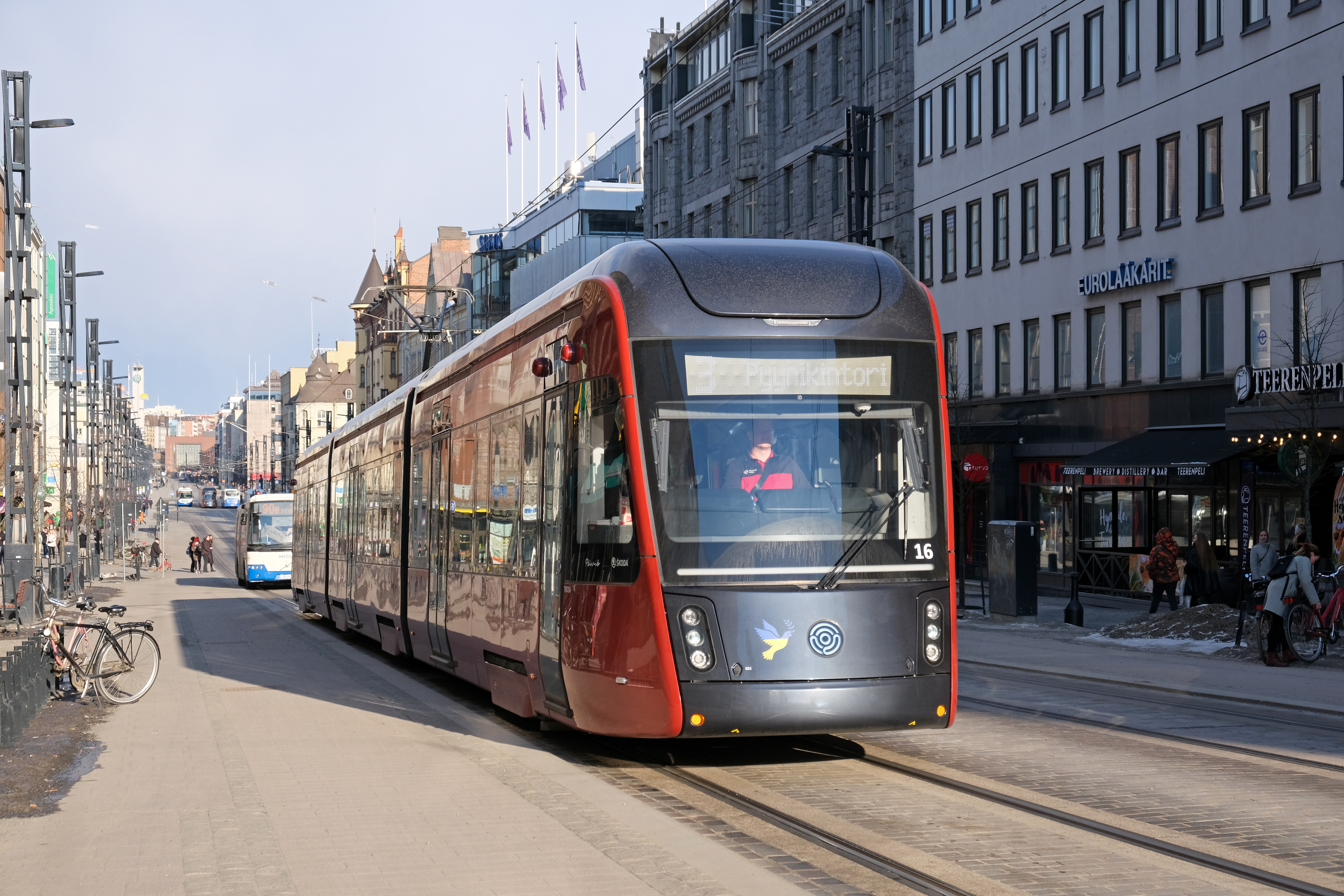
- Tram on Hämeenkatu

Overview
- Native name: Tampereen Ratikka
- Area served: Tampere, Finland
- Transit type: Light rail
- Number of lines: 2
- Number of stops: 33
- Annual ridership: 20.5 million (2025)
- Website: Official website

Operation
- Began operation: August 9, 2021; 5 years ago
- Operator: VR

Technical
- System length: 24 km (14.9 mi) (phases 1 and 2)
- Track gauge: 1,435 mm (4 ft 8 1/2 in) standard gauge
- Electrification: 750 V DC overhead
- Average speed: 19–22 km/h (12–14 mph)
- Top speed: 70 km/h (43 mph)

Map of the Tampere tram network from January 2025

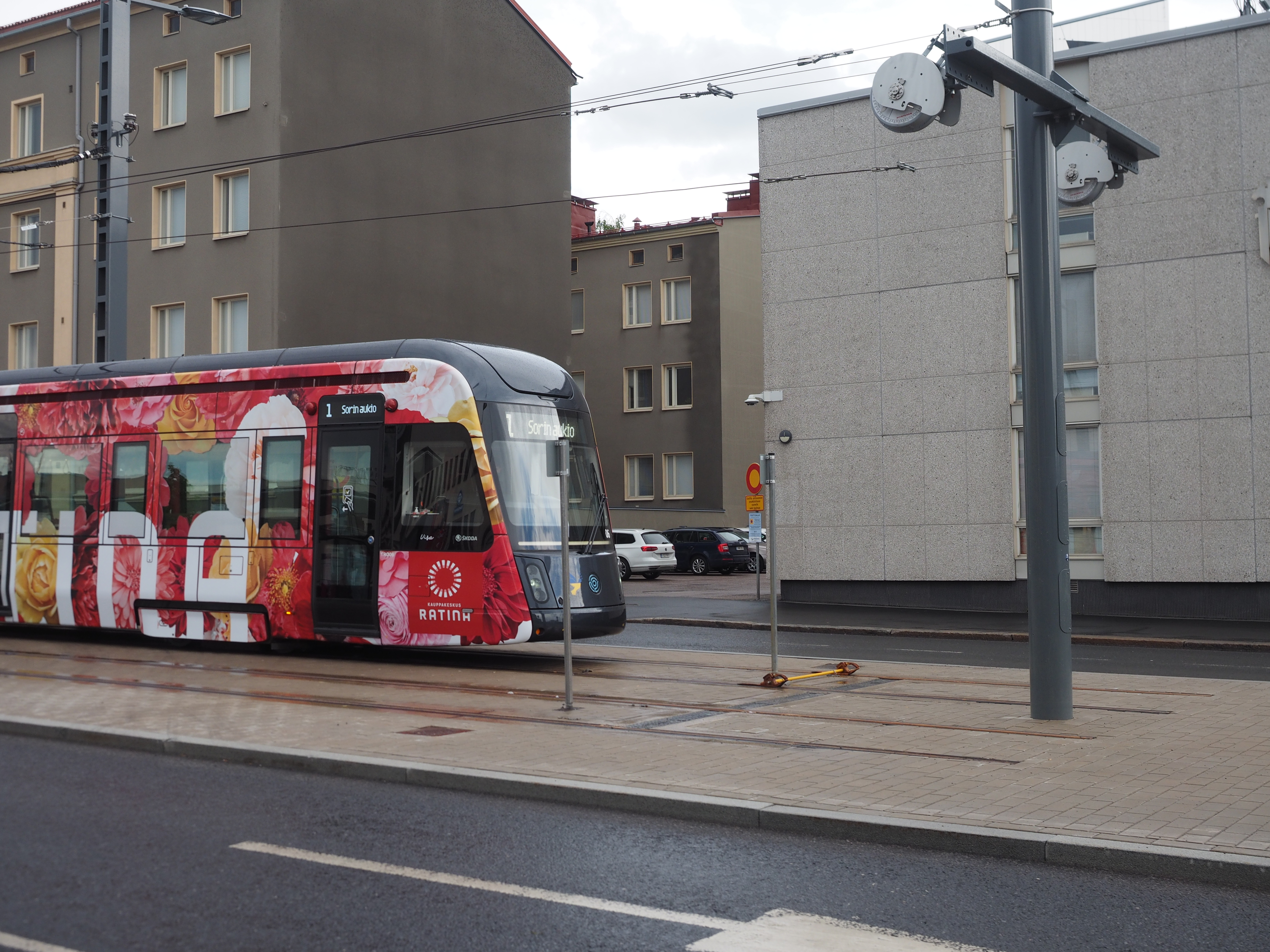
A tram on line 1 at its end stop at Sorin aukio square in central Tampere. The tracks physically end at this stop and the trams have to switch direction to continue their journey.

The Tampere light rail (Finnish: Tampereen raitiotie), branded as Tampere Tram (Finnish: Tampereen Ratikka), is a public transport system in Tampere, Finland. In November 2016, the Tampere city council approved plans to construct a 330-million-euro light rail system on the route from the city centre to Hervanta and to the Tampere University Hospital. Traffic on the first two lines of the route (lines 1 and 3) began on 9 August 2021.

An extension from the city centre to Lentävänniemi, passing through the artificial island Näsisaari that serves the structure of light rail, opened in two parts in 2023 and 2025. A further extension of line 1, now ending at Sorin aukio in the city center towards neighbouring Pirkkala is under construction, scheduled to be finalised in 2028. Further extensions in Pirkkala and to Ylöjärvi and Linnainmaa are being designed.

Unlike Turku, another Finnish city that is planning a new light rail system (see Turku light rail), Tampere had not had a previously existing tram or light rail system. The construction of a tram system in Tampere was seriously studied between the years 1907 and 1929, but left unrealised due to the high price of constructing such a system.

Tampere is the fourth city in Finland to have a tram system, but one of only two to still have trams in service, as Turku discontinued tram service in 1972 and Vyborg (already part of the Soviet Union at the time) did so in 1957.

== Traffic ==
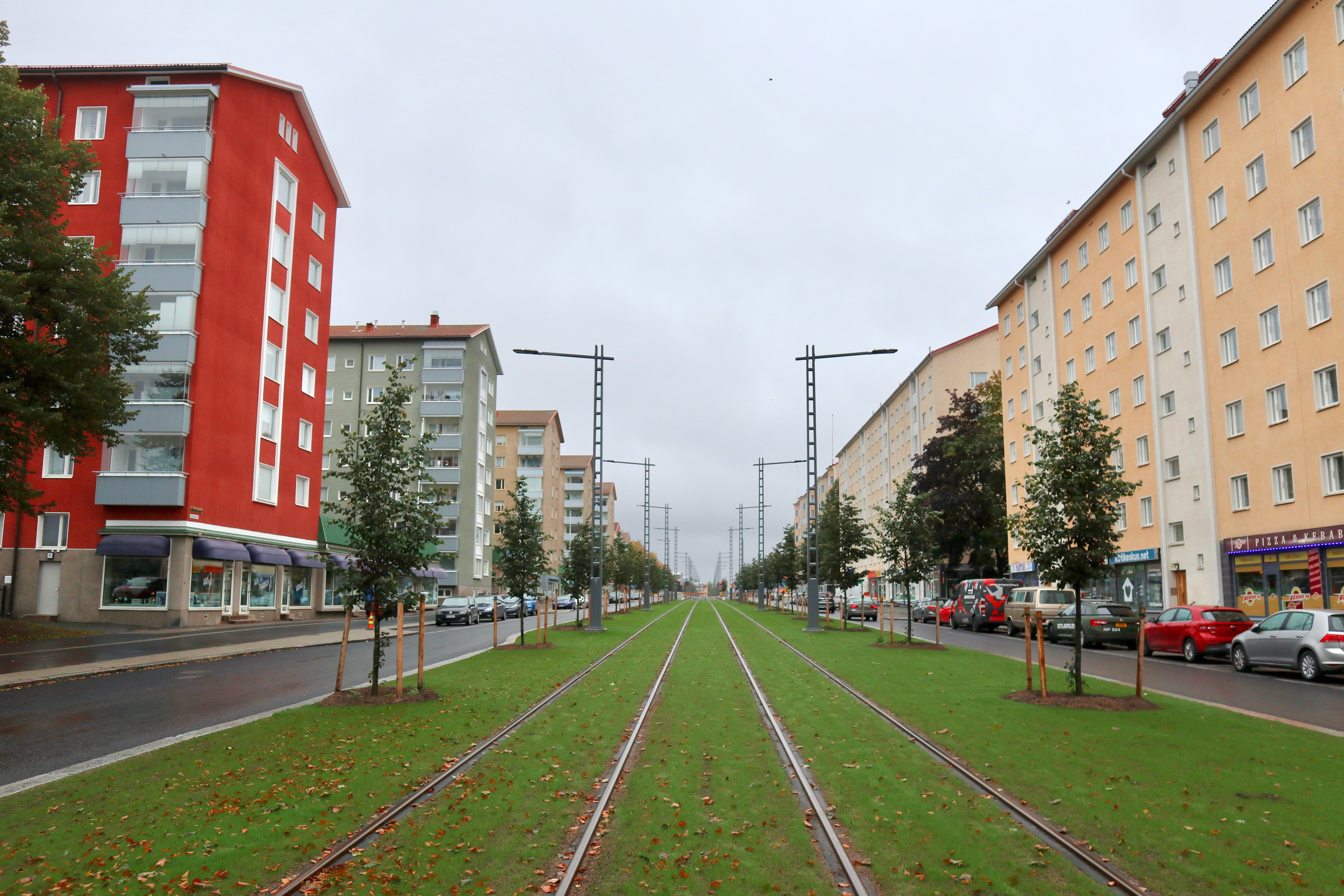
Tram tracks on the grass on Sammonkatu in autumn 2019

After negotiations, the VR Group was chosen as the operator of the Tampere light rail in 2019. The agreement includes traffic operations and traffic direction. The company Tampereen Raitiotie Oy (TRO), owned by the city of Tampere, is responsible for the vehicle stock and infrastructure. The traffic is commissioned by the Tampere Regional Transport Authority. Commercial test traffic started on 10 May 2021 and traffic proper started on 9 August 2021.

=== Lines ===
Line	Route	Stops	Expansions in planning or under construction
1	Kauppi - Lentävänniemi	20	Kauppi - Niihama (scheduled completion in 2028)
3	Hervantajärvi - Sorin aukio	17	Sorin aukio - Partola, Pirkkala (scheduled completion in 2028)

The Tampere light rail operates two lines, 1 and 3. The numbering of the lines is in accordance with the rest of the public transport in Tampere so that line numbers between trams and buses are not duplicated.

At the start of operations, line 3 replaced the old bus lines 3 and 4 and ran from Pyynikki via Sammonaukio, Hakametsä and Hervanta to Hervantajärvi. Line 1, formed from the middle part of the old bus line 1, started from Sorin aukio and traveled along the tracks used by line 3 from Koskipuisto to Sammonaukio, where it branched off via the Tampere University Hospital to Kauppi. The travel time from Pyynikki to Hervantajärvi was about 29 minutes. The individual routes run up to every six minutes during the week.

An extension of the line from Pyynikki to Santalahti opened in 2023 and in June 2024 the lines were reorganised with line 1 running from Santalahti to Kauppi and Line 3 from Sorin Aukio to Hervantajärvi. Since January 2025 line 1 has been extended from Santalahti to Lentävänniemi. Both lines have several shared stops where it is possible to switch lines at the same platform. It is planned that after the extensions are completed the lines will be changed back to their original routes.

=== Rolling stock ===
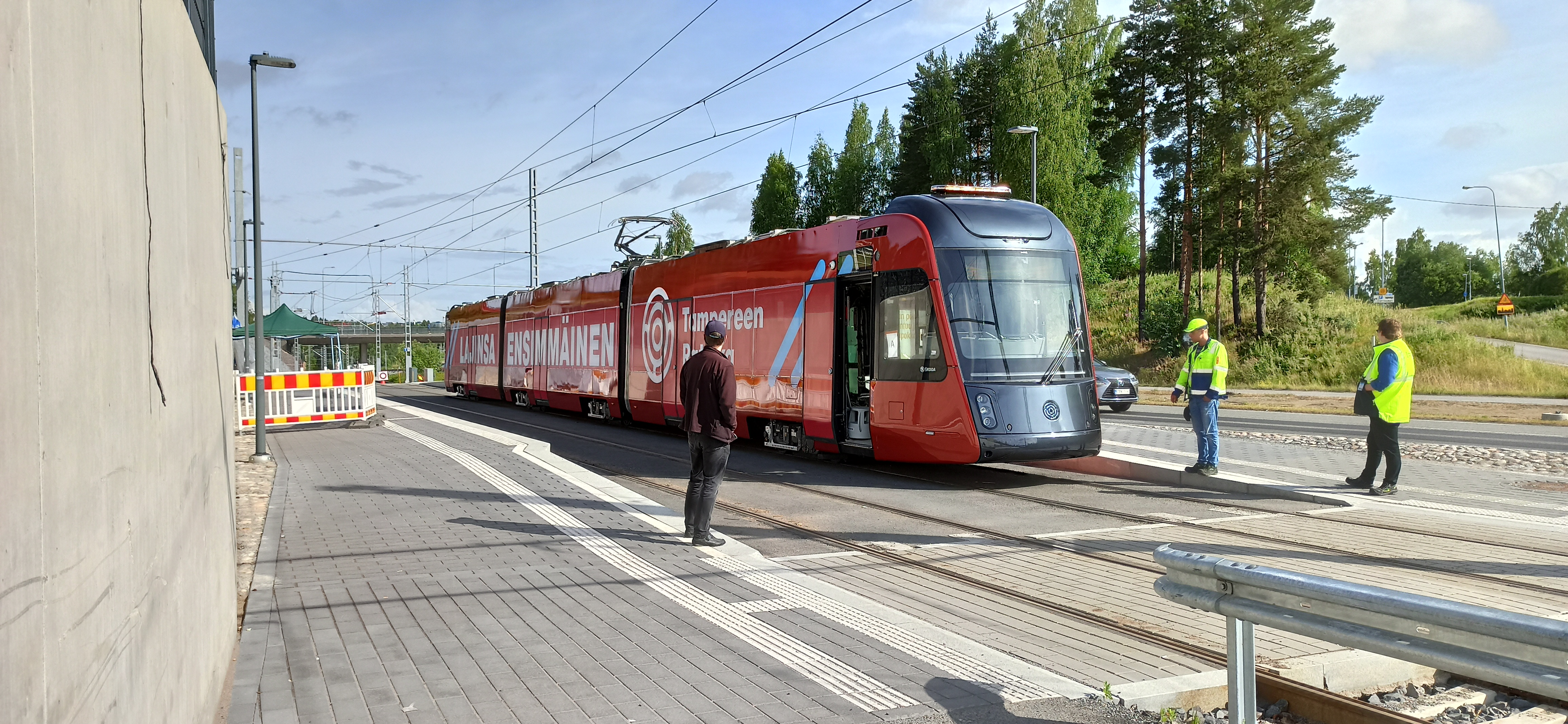
Artic X34 prototype on test drive

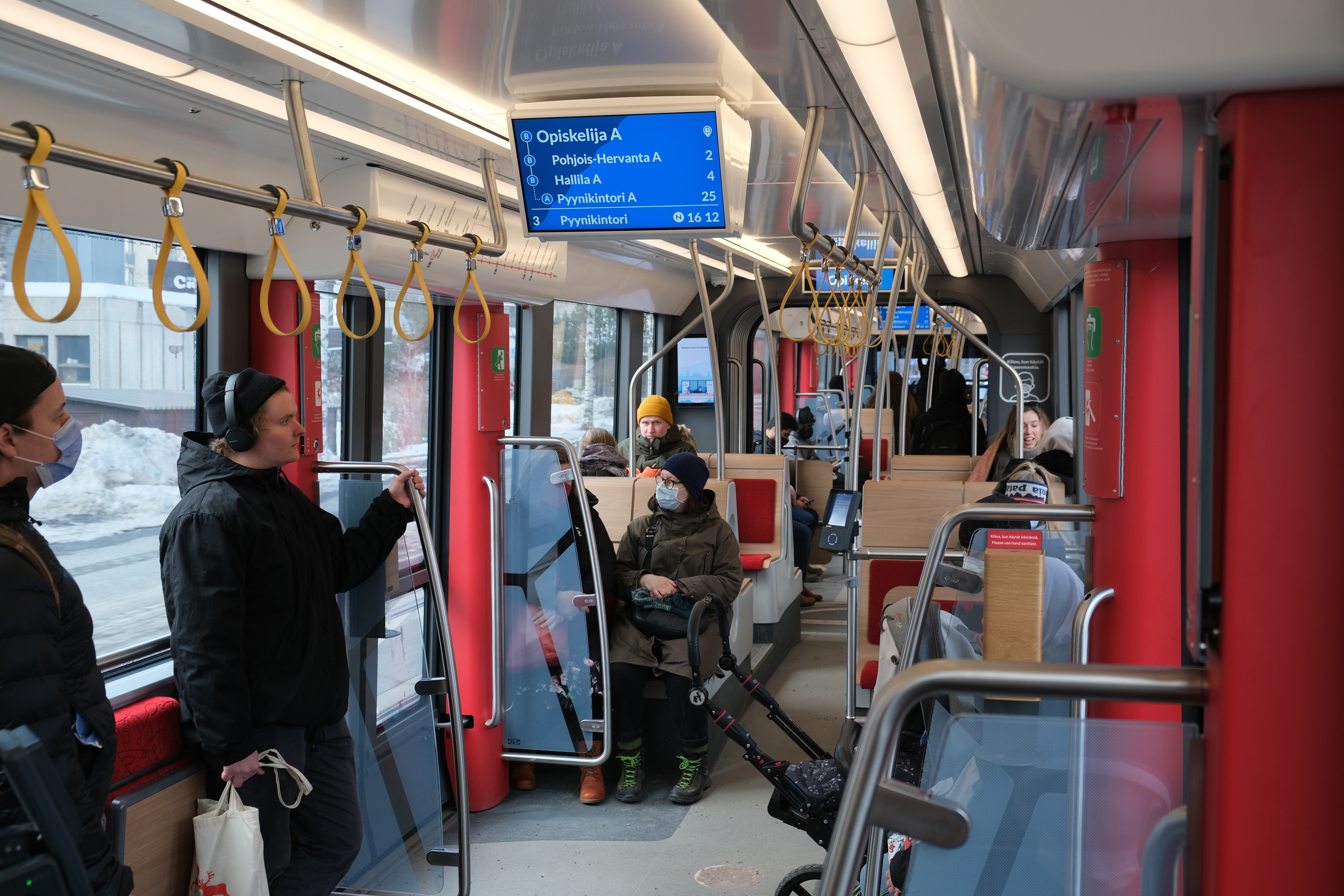
Inside a Škoda Artic X34 tram

After a bidding process, the Kajaani-based company Škoda Transtech was selected as the supplier of the rolling stock in October 2016. A competing bidder lodged a complaint with the market court, but the complaint was rejected in October 2017. Following the decision, Transtech and the city of Tampere signed an agreement for the delivery of the Artic X34 tram vehicles. The tram design was finalised in 2018.

Nineteen vehicles were delivered for the opening of the first phase of the tramway. The contract also included options for up to 46 additional vehicles and for extra modules to extend tram length. The first vehicles were test-driven in 2020. In 2022, an agreement was made to assemble a sixth additional vehicle from spare parts, followed by further orders for five and then three more trams. This brought the total of 28 vehicles for the first and second stages, with a price per vehicle of 3.2 to 3.8 million euro and the price for the entire order of about 97.5 million euro.

In September 2024, an agreement was made for Transtech to extend eleven trams with an additional 10-metre long module, increasing capacity by 30%. The first extended tram is expected to be ready for testing in 2026. A further order was placed in December 2024 for additional seven three-section trams and eight extension modules for existing vehicles, with deliveries scheduled for 2027–2028.

The model used on the Tampere tram is the ForCity Smart Artic X34 and they are 37.3 metres long, low-floored and bidirectional. The contract includes an option to lengthen the vehicles to 47 metres. The industrial design company Idis Design was selected to design the vehicles in January 2018. Core design solutions were developed in early 2018, followed by refinement using a life-size mock-up to finalise details. The first raw model tram was completed in March 2018 and the finished model was presented to Tampere citizens in February 2019. Construction of the vehicles began at Transtech's Otanmäki facility in Kajaani in October 2018; the first unit was completed and delivered to Tampere in May 2020. In February 2020, Transtech had already provided a TW 6000 tram from 1981 to Tampere as a test vehicle.

The vehicles have capacity for 264 passengers, including 104 seated. The maximum operating speed is 70 km/h; the average speed is 19 to 22 km/h. Movement between the platform and the tram is level and accessible. The final exterior design and color scheme were announced in October 2018, with brick red selected as the primary color.

== History ==
=== 1907–1929: tram system planning ===
Official plans for a tram system in Tampere were initiated in 1907 when a committee was established to study its construction. The study, completed in 1909, found the construction of a tram system relatively expensive, but during the first years of the next decade, it seemed that Tampere would get a tram system. Eventually, the plans were shelved due to World War I. Around the same time, plans for tram systems were also made in other Finnish cities. The Turku tram was opened in 1908 and the Vyborg tram in 1912; while Lahti (1907–17) and Riihimäki (1922) also made serious studies into the matter, though their systems, too, were left unbuilt. After the war, subsequent plans for a tram system in Tampere were made as late as 1929, but these, again, were not realised.

=== 2001–2004: TramTrain proposal ===
The construction of a light rail system for Tampere had been discussed since the 1970s, but the decision-makers of the city were hesitant to make any decisions without collaboration with other cities in Finland to keep down costs. In 2001, the city took the initiative in planning a light rail network when a rail traffic project group was formed to study the construction of such a system by the Finnish Ministry of Traffic & Communication, VR Group and various cities in the Greater Tampere area. The group completed its work in 2004, recommending a tram-train system utilising pre-existing railroad sections, newly built track and a tunnel section under central Tampere to avoid traffic jams. The proposed system was named TamTrain as a pun on Tram-Train.

The TamTrain proposal created some criticism as existing urban areas in the region are around major roads, not railroads, and the proposed system would have, in fact, worsened public transport connections in many areas. The tunnel under the center of the city was also found problematic, as constructing such a tunnel would have forced the light rail lines to completely bypass important traffic hubs such as TAYS (Tampere University Hospital). Additionally, the 1.5 km (0.93 mi) tunnel section, which would have included only three stops, would have constituted 29% of the total price of the 83 km (52 mi) system.

=== TASE 2025 light rail plan ===
The intermediary TASE 2025 report published in 2007 recommended the creation of a light rail system running alongside major roads linking central Tampere to the suburbs of Vuores and Hervanta in phase 1 (by 2015), Lielahti and Lentävänniemi in phase 2 (2015–25), with links to Koilliskeskus, Ojala-Lamminrahka and Pirkkala in phase 3 (after 2025). There are also plans to continue light rail to the town of Ylöjärvi. In addition to the light rail system, the study recommended the creation of a commuter rail line utilising pre-existing railroad lines as well as improvements into pre-existing bus connections in areas not covered by either rail option. According to these recommendations, the initial parts of the light rail system would be opened in 2015. Although technically a light rail system, the system proposed in TASE 2025 is referred to in Finnish as katuraitiotie, "street tramway", as opposed to the term pikaraitiotie, literally "rapid tramway", which is a commonly used word for all kinds of light rail systems in Finnish, but which has been used almost exclusively for TramTrain-esque systems with a tunnel in the city centre in Tampere.

The length of the proposed light rail system would be 17.6 kilometres (10.9 mi) in phase 1, 24.2 km (15.0 mi) in phase 2 and 43 km (27 mi) in phase 3. The total cost of the system would be €298 million. The light rail system is projected to make approximately €10 million of yearly profit, whereas the current all-bus based system generates average losses of €10 million every year. A subsequent intermediary report submitted on 5 March 2009 proposed four different alternatives for the future development of public transport in Tampere, all of which included the realisation of a light rail system. The initial phase in all four alternatives was the same, but the precise routes and lengths of the subsequent extensions were different.

=== Construction ===
The city of Tampere asked for tenders from consultants with experience in designing light rail/tram systems during the summer of 2010. The deadline for submitting tenders was on 16 August 2010, after which a consultant was chosen. The plan was that the consultant's report should be ready by the end of April 2011, after which the city council will make the decision on whether or not to proceed with the construction of a light rail system.

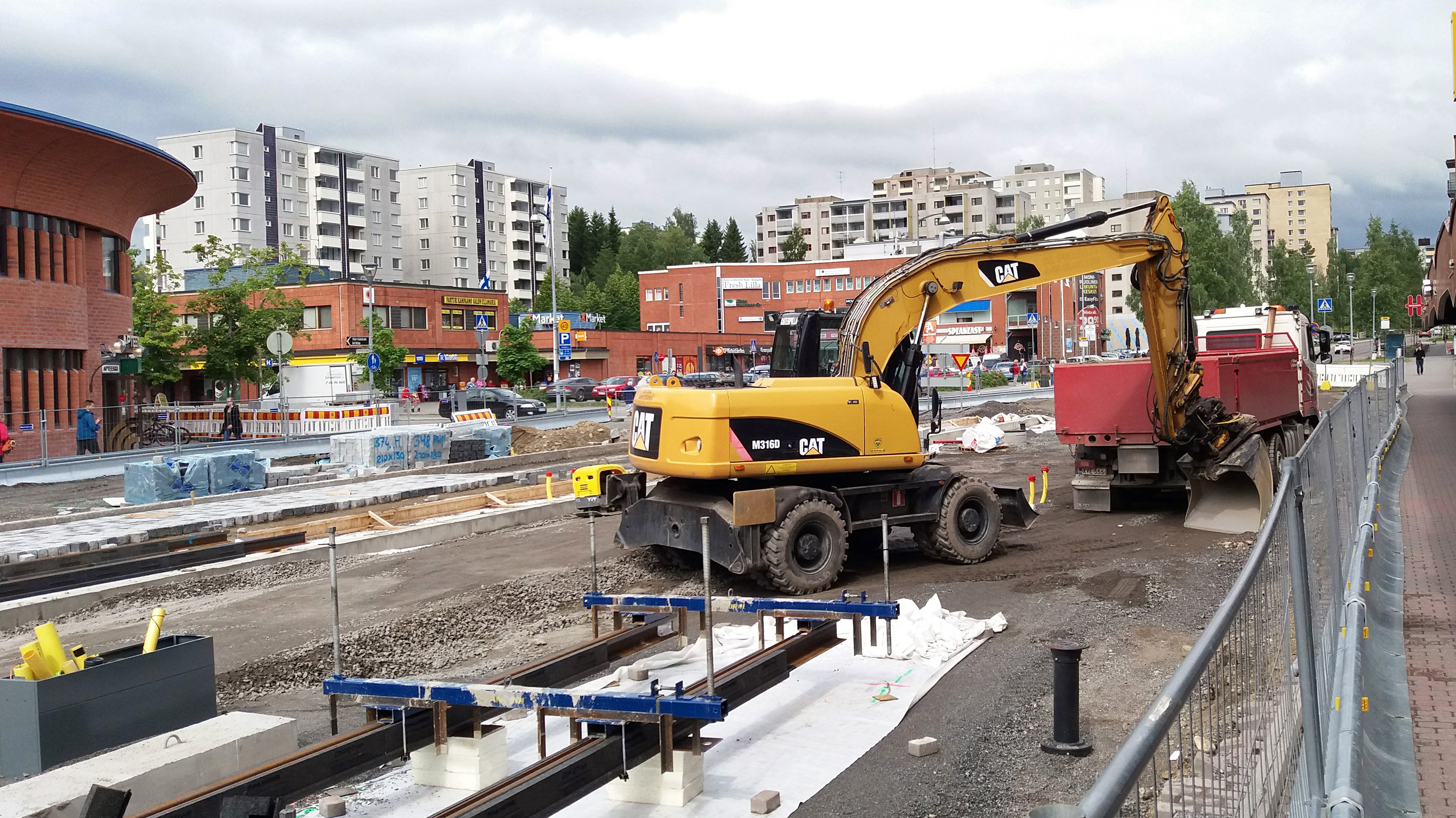
Tram rail construction in Hervanta

A final decision was made in the city council on 7 November 2016 to start construction and to purchase trams. The tram supplier will be Transtech, a Finnish subsidiary of Škoda Transportation. The rail gauge is 1435 mm, which makes vehicle purchase easier, because producers generally have developed trams for this gauge. Construction commenced in 2017 and the first phase (city centre to TAYS and Hervanta) was opened in 2021. The cost, including rolling stock, was estimated at €330 million. After construction of the first phase was completed, the Tampere municipal council announced that the final cost of the project was €34 million under the revised budget of €300 million.

Keolis, Länsilinjat and VR were shortlisted to operate the tramway, with the contract awarded to VR in April 2019 for a period of 10 years, with an option to extend for a further three years.

=== Operations ===
The light rail began operating in August 2021. In the first year of operations, around 10 million trips were made using the system, accounting for around a quarter of all public transport trips during the period.

The first part of Phase 2, a 2-km, 3-station extension to Santalahti, opened on 7 August 2023. The full Phase 2 extension to Lentävänniemi opened in January 2025.

Extensions from Kauppi to Niihama and from Sorin aukio to Partola in the neighbouring municipality of Pirkkala were approved by the Tampere city and Pirkkala municipal councils in October 2024. Construction began in late 2024 and is due to be completed in 2028.
