= Lentävänniemi =

City district in Tampere, Finland

Coordinates: 61°31′55″N 23°42′21″E

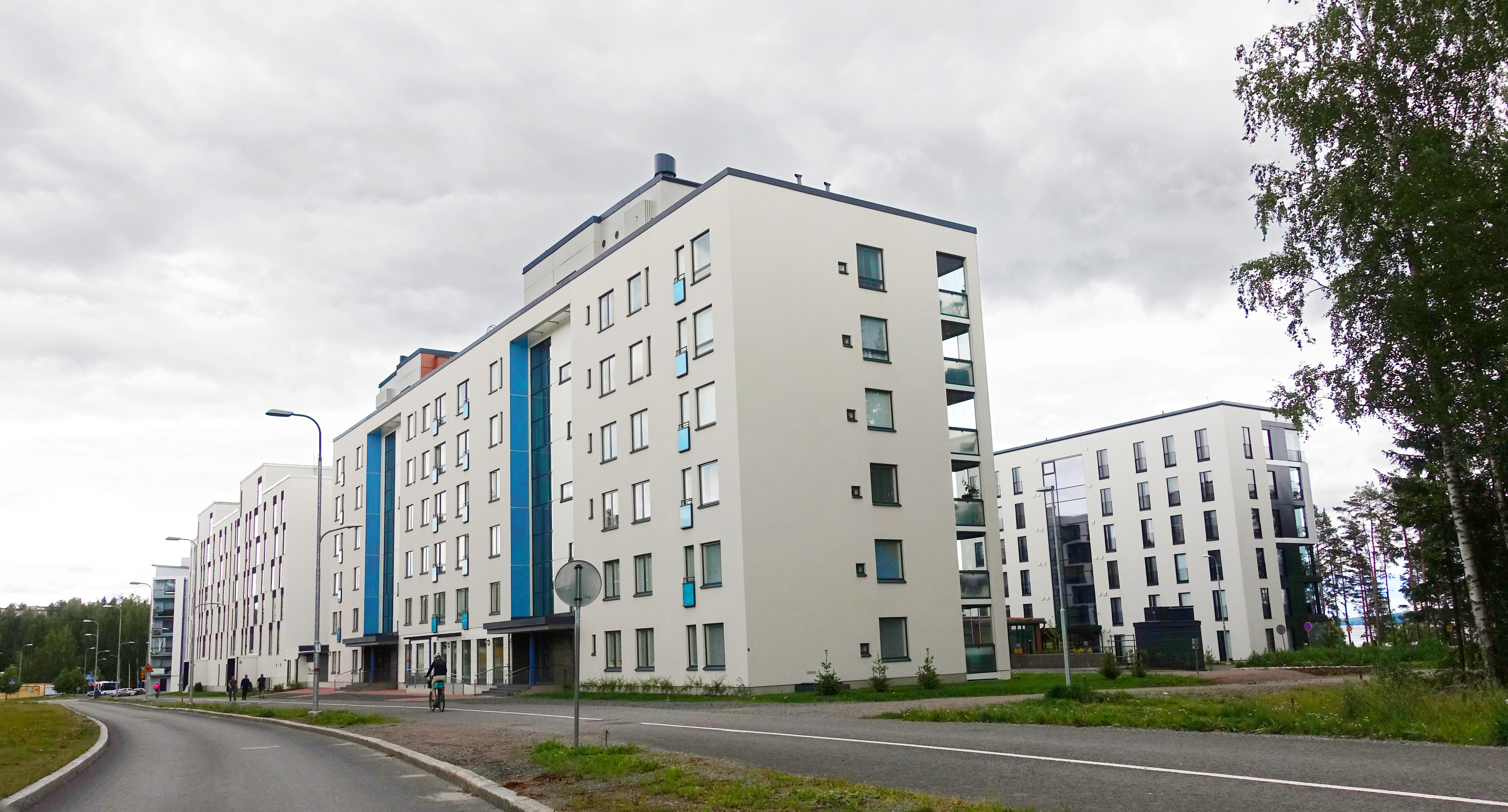
Apartment buildings along the Lielahdenkatu street in Lentävänniemi

Lentävänniemi (Finnish pronunciation: [ˈle̞n̪t̪æʋænˌnie̯mi]) is a district in the western part of Tampere on the shores of Lake Näsijärvi in Pirkanmaa, Finland. It belongs to the northwestern part of the city and borders the Niemi and Niemenranta borders on the southwest. There are jogging paths along the lake and its shores surrounding the apartment-based Lentävänniemi. In 2014, the population of Lentävänniemi was 4,309.

Lentävänniemi originally belonged to the municipality of Ylöjärvi, from where it was transferred to the city of Tampere in the early 1950s. The first town plan for Lentävänniemi was completed in 1966, and the entire area was zoned in 1974. Most of the street names in Lentävänniemi are group names related to navigating the waters according to the location of the place (such as Airokatu, Venekatu and Majakkakatu). Jänissaarenkatu, Jänislahdenkatu, Jänislammenkatu and Suomensaarenkatu are based on natural names. The former island of Suomensaari in Lake Näsijärvi, which grew close to the mainland as a peninsula, had a croft on Suomensaari in the early 19th century.

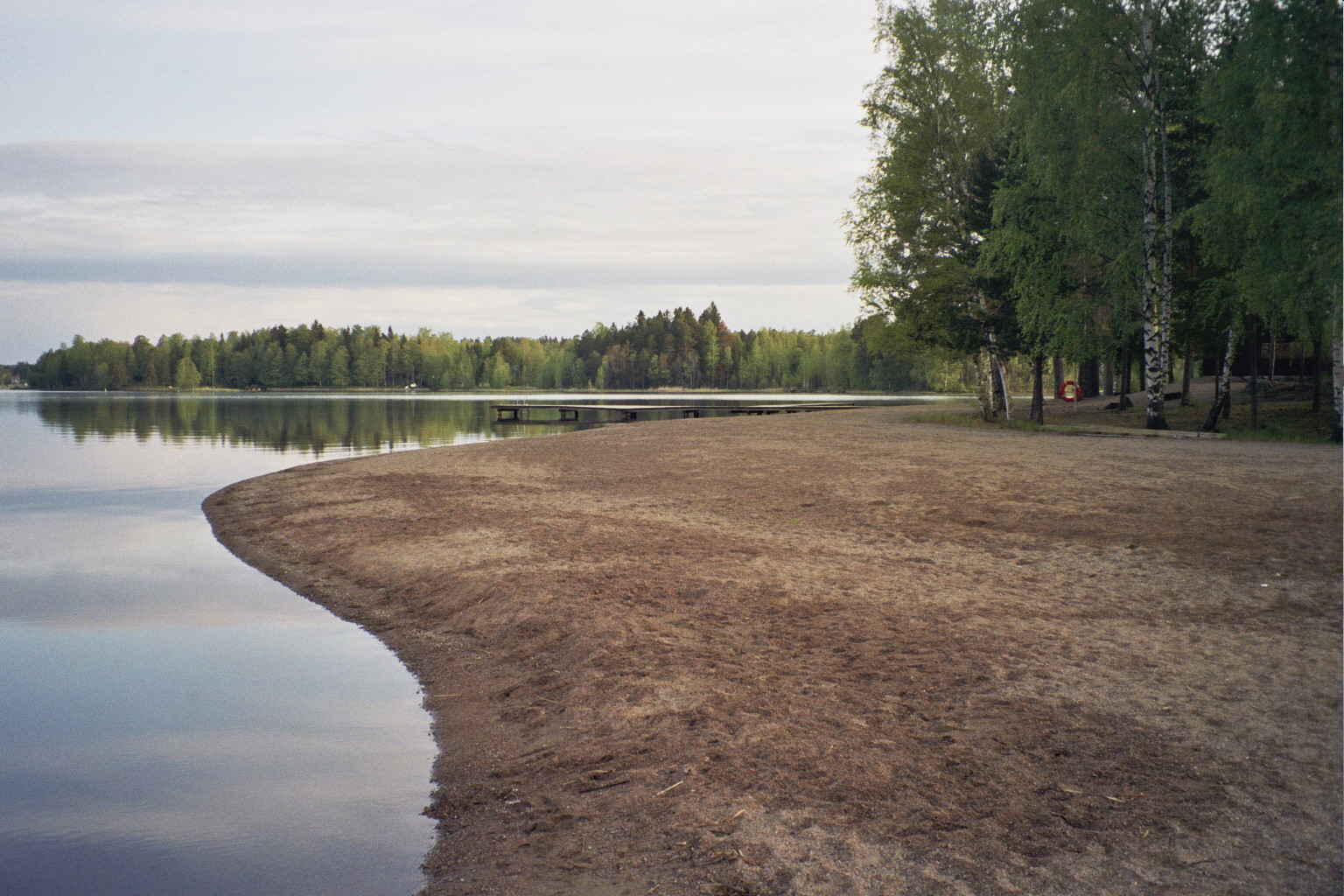
Suomensaari Beach

Bus lines 3 and 14 run from Lentävänniemi to the city center of Tampere, about nine kilometers away. In addition, line 36 runs to Tampere University Hospital. Lentävänniemi has a school for grades 1-6, a kindergarten, a pizzeria, a barbecue kiosk, a sports field, a small shopping center with a pub, hairdresser, kebab restaurant, K-Market grocery store, and youth center, as well as two harbors, one of which is Jänissaari, which serves as the Näsijärvi Sailing Club. The Lentävänniemi library, which operated in the same building as the Lentävänniemi school, was merged with the Lamminpää library in the Lielahtikeskus, which was completed in 2014, into the Lielahti library.

In the second phase of Tampere tram traffic, a light rail connection to Lentävänniemi would be established from the city center.

== See also ==
- Lielahti
