= Kyttälä =

Area of Tampere, Finland

Coordinates: 61.498528°N 23.771708°E

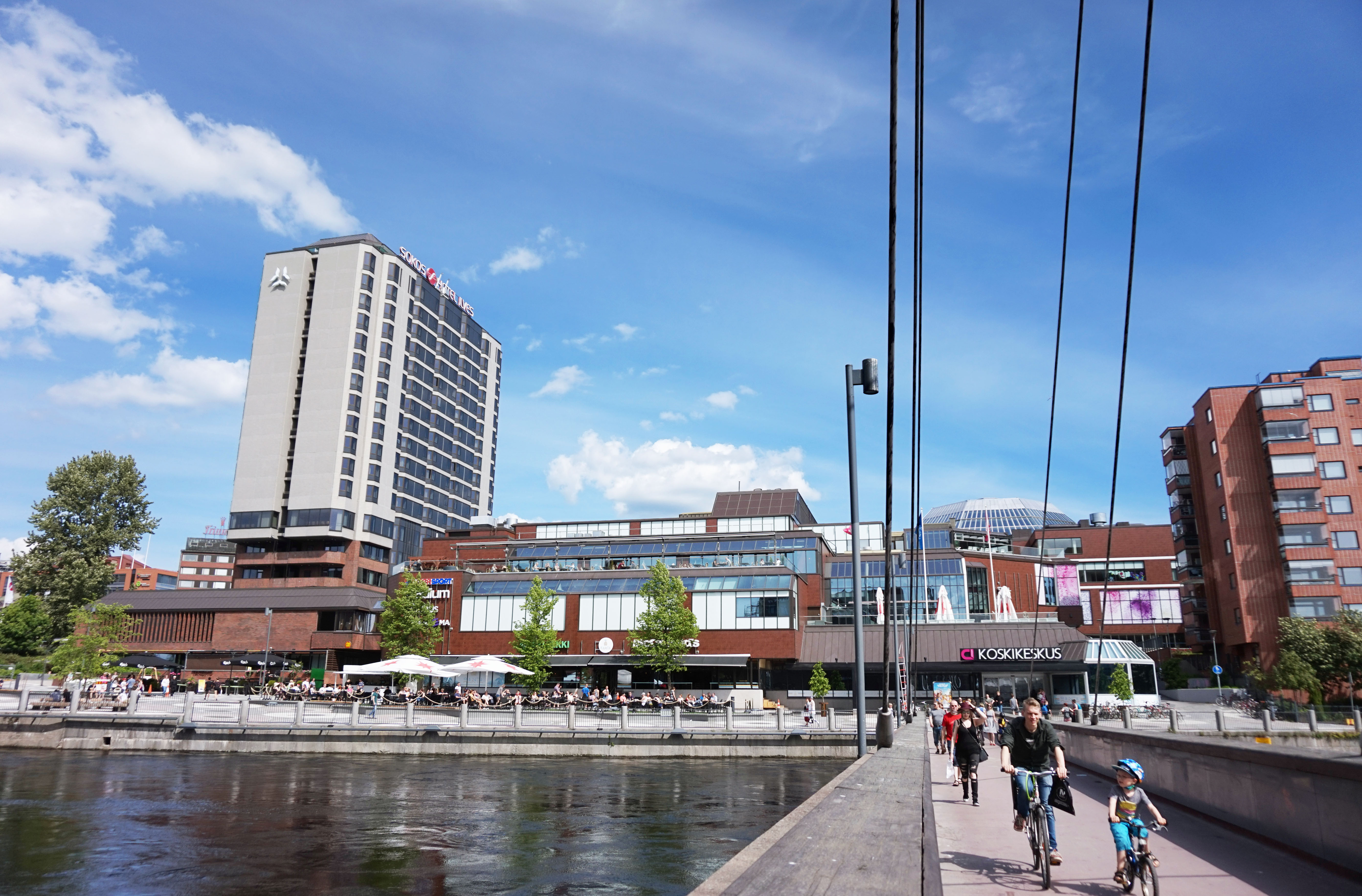
Kyttälä

Kyttälä is a district in Tampere, Finland. It was born in the late 1870s as a working-class neighborhood to the eastern outskirts of the town. As Tampere soon expanded, Kyttälä is now a part of the city center between the Tammerkoski river and the railway. Population of Kyttälä is 3,348 (31 December 2014). Aleksanterinkatu is one of Kyttälä's main streets. The direct connection to the Liisankallio district and from there to Teiskontie and Sammonkatu streets runs along Itsenäisyydenkatu and connection to the Jussinkylä district runs along Tuomiokirkonkatu. Rongankatu street in Kyttälä was renovated in 2023. There's now a four-meter-wide, two-way bicycle path in the middle of the Rongankatu street.

== Notable sights ==
- Tampere Orthodox Church
- Hotel Tammer
- Tampere railway station
- Hotel Ilves
- Koskikeskus (shopping centre)
- Posteljooninpuisto
- Sori Square

== See also ==
- Ratina (district)
- Tulli (district)
