= Sori Square =

Square in Tampere, Finland

Coordinates: 61°29′42″N 23°46′13″E

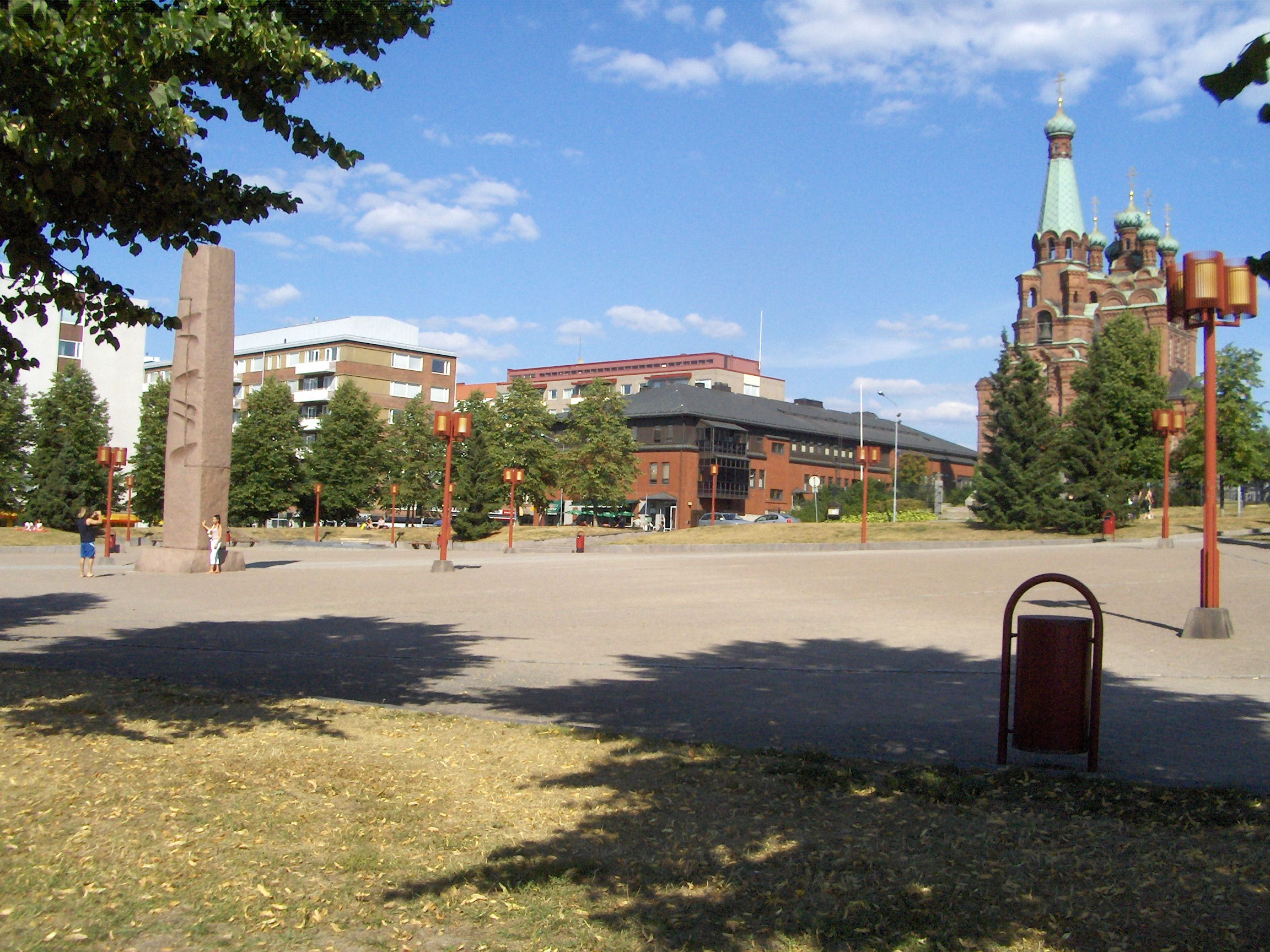
The Sori Square in 2006

The Sori Square (Finnish: Sorin aukio) is a square located in the center of Tampere, Finland, in the southern part of the Kyttälä district. It is located in the area bounded by the Hatanpää Highway, Suvantokatu, Tuomiokirkonkatu and Vuolteenkatu. At the eastern end of the square is the Tampere Orthodox Church from 1898. There is a terminus at Tampere Tram Line 1 on the west side.

The square was built in the 1980s, and its artistic composition was by sculptor Harry Kivijärvi. In the square is his 10-meter sculpture called Pirkka. Kivijärvi has also designed the area's lamps, benches and trash bins, as well as a mosaic-decorated water basin in the northern corner of the square. The work was completed in the autumn of 1987.

The name of Sori Square was marked in the town plan in 1985. It is based on the old place name Sorinahde; the hill that rises from Ratina towards Kalevankangas has been called Sorinahde, and the square is located in the middle of the hill.

== See also ==
- Aleksanterinkatu (Tampere)
- Laukontori
- Tampere Bus Station
