= Tuomiokirkonkatu =

Street in Tampere, Finland

Coordinates: 61°29′51.70618″N 23°46′12.91382″E

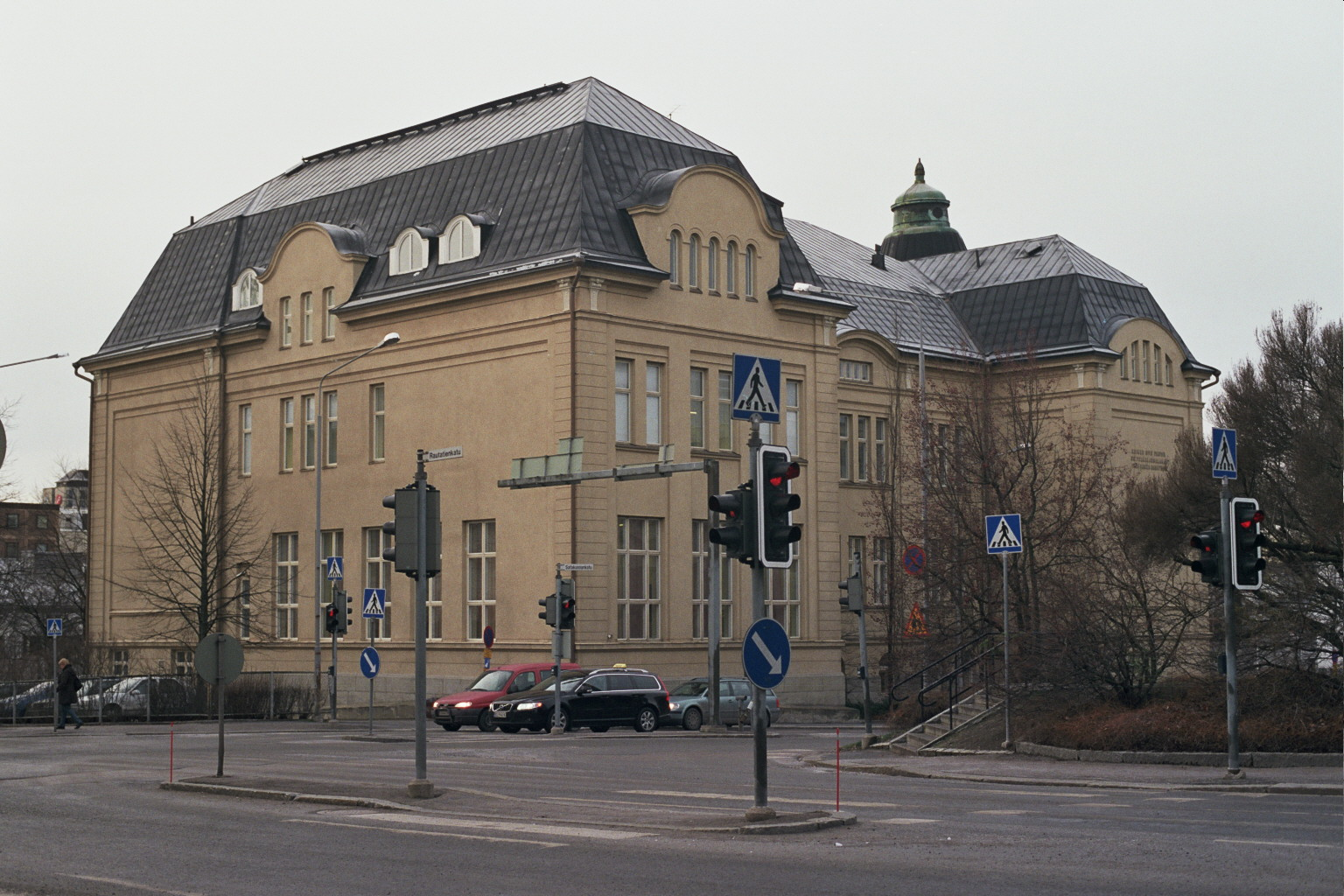
The Classical High School of Tampere along Tuomiokirkonkatu.

Tuomiokirkonkatu (literally "Cathedral Street") is a north–south street in the center of Tampere, Finland, which runs through the districts of Jussinkylä and Kyttälä. The street is about a kilometer long. In the north it ends at Lapintie, in the south Vuolteenkatu. In Kyttälä, part of Tuomiokirkonkatu has been turned into a pedestrian street. In the future, the pedestrian section will be expanded so that it will eventually extend south from Kyttälänkatu to Suvantokatu and the Sori Square (Sorin aukio).

The street got its current name in 1936, when the city underwent a major street name reform. Tuomiokirkonkatu refers to the Tampere Cathedral, which is located along the street. The previous name Viinikankatu was in the town plan in 1886–1936. The old name was abandoned because it was considered misleading; after the town plan changes, the street no longer led to the Viinikka district.

Tuomiokirkonkatu has several important sites for cultural historically architecture of cityscape. In addition to the nationally significant the Tampere Cathedral (1906), the Orthodox Church (1898), which was Kyttälä's first church building, rises along the street. Other notable buildings include the Classical High School of Tampere (1907), the Tuominen Stone Wall (1910), and the Stockmann department store (1981).
