= Näsisaari =

Artificial island in Tampere, Finland

Coordinates: 61°30′37″N 23°41′46″E

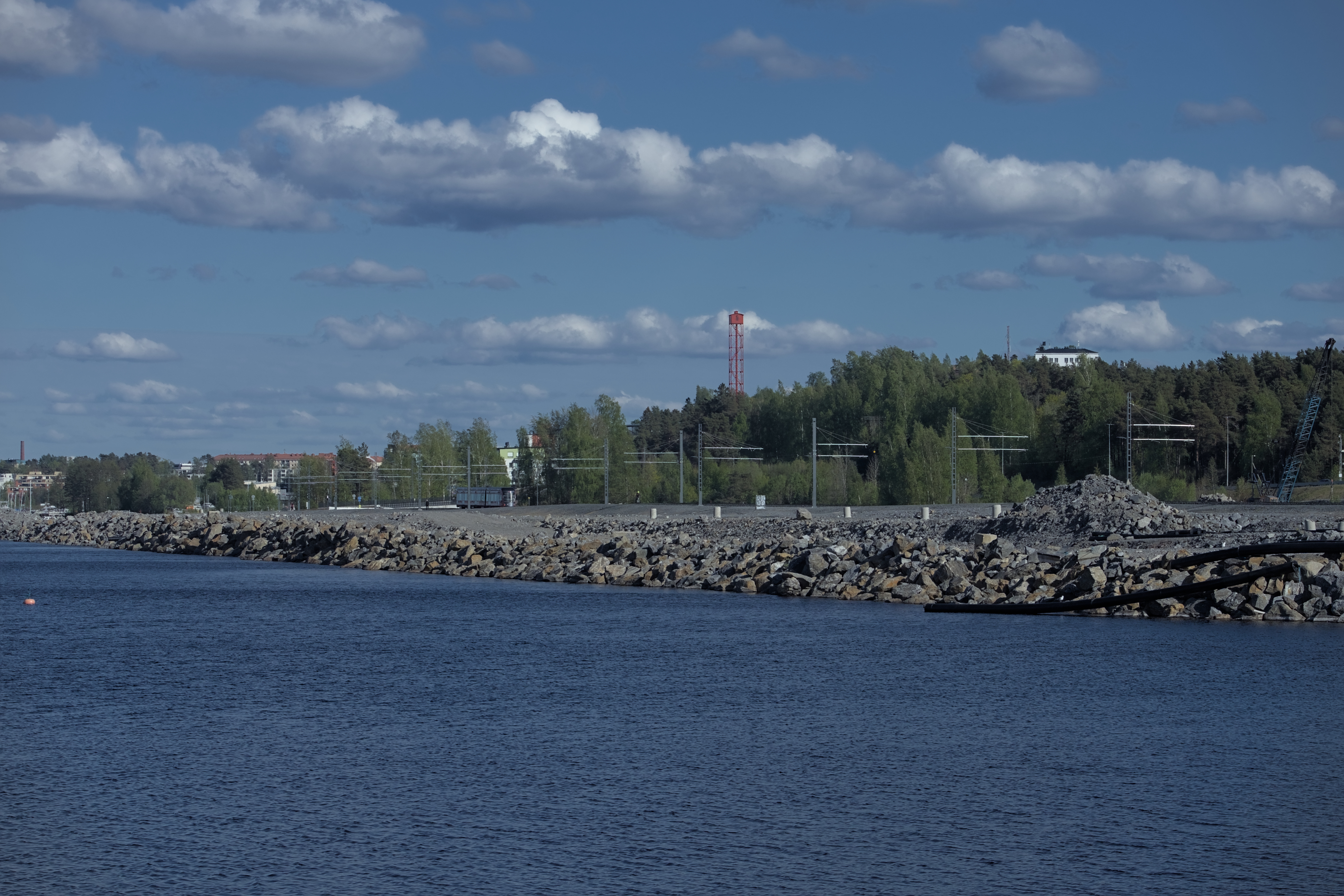
Näsisaari in May 2026

Näsisaari is an artificial island built in lake Näsijärvi in the Hiedanranta district of Tampere, Finland. The 800 m × 200 m (2,620 ft × 660 ft) island was filled in 2022 using 1.2 million cubic metres of land excavated for the Sulkavuori Central Wastewater Treatment Plant.

An extension of the Tampere light rail system passes via the island, and there are also pedestrian and bike paths through the island. The city of Tampere has plans to expand the island and use the land for apartments for about 5,000 new residents. The resulting residential area would be called Järvikaupunki (lit. 'Lake city') and would be constructed in the 2030s at earliest.
