= Aleksanterinkatu (Tampere) =

Street in Tampere, Finland

Coordinates: 61°29′58.03″N 23°46′05.62″E

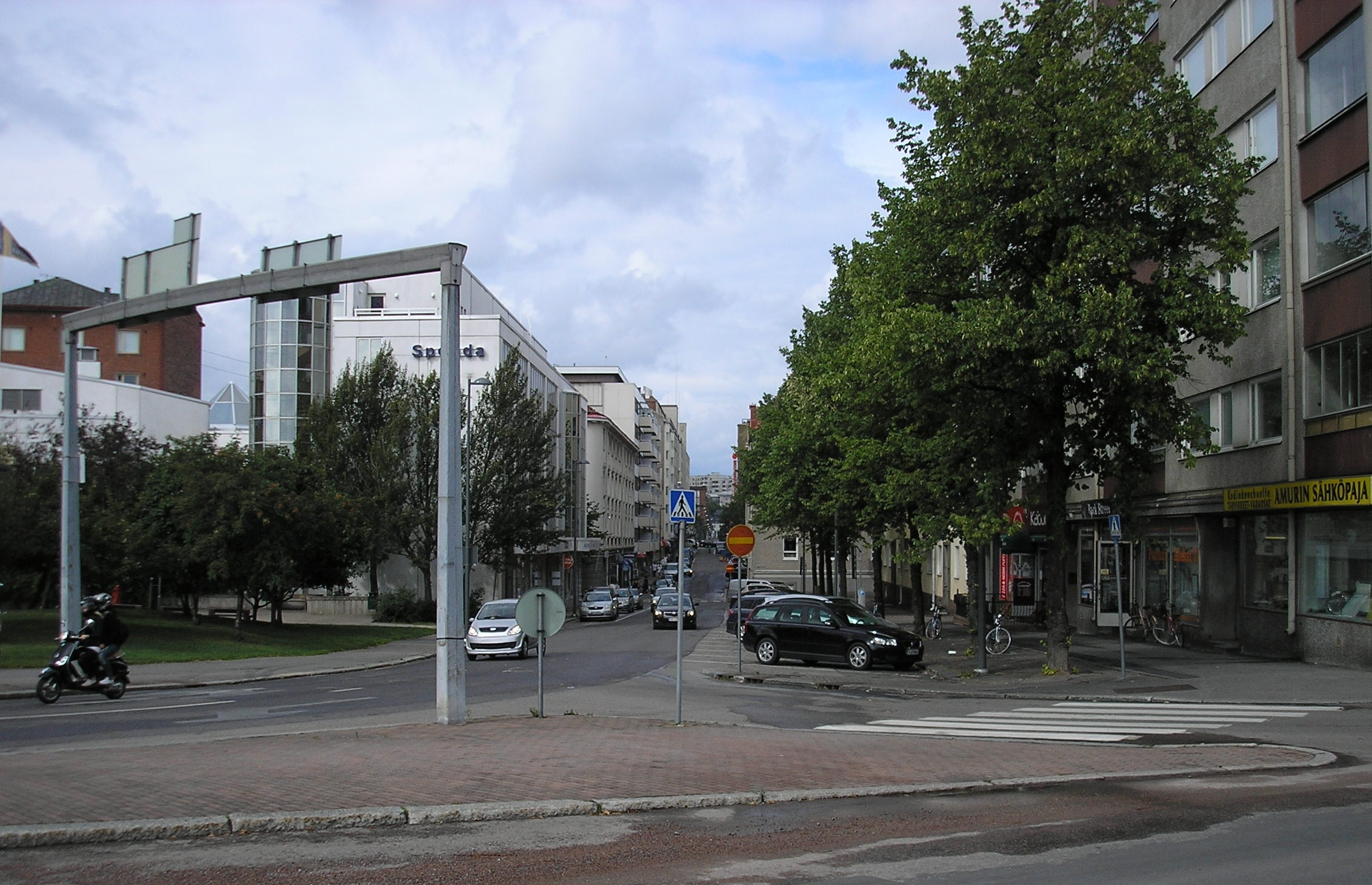
A view of the Aleksanterinkatu from the Sori Square.

Aleksanterinkatu ("Alexander Street") is a street in the Kyttälä district, in the centre of Tampere, Finland. It is a north–south street, which is one of the cross streets of Hämeenkatu, Tampere's main street. In the south, it intersects the Hatanpää highway at Sori Square and ends in the north at Erkkilänaukee in Jussinkylä, near Tampere Cathedral.

Like most streets in Kyttälä, Aleksanterinkatu was named in 1877, when the area was annexed to the city of Tampere and a town plan was approved. However, the town plan was not put into practice until the 1890s, when the 15-year lease granted to the old inhabitants of the area expired. The name Aleksanterinkatu presumably refers to Tsar Alexander II of Russia, who had confirmed Tampere's free city rights unchanged for a new 50-year period in 1855.

Aleksanterinkatu is also the name of the main street in many other Finnish cities, e.g.: Helsinki, Lahti, Oulu, Porvoo and Loviisa.

== Sources ==
Media related to Aleksanterinkatu (Tampere) at Wikimedia Commons

- Louhivaara, Maija (1999). Tampereen kadunnimet. Tampere: Tampereen museot. ISBN 951-609-105-9. (in Finnish)
