= Tampere University Hospital =

- Hospital District of Pirkanmaa
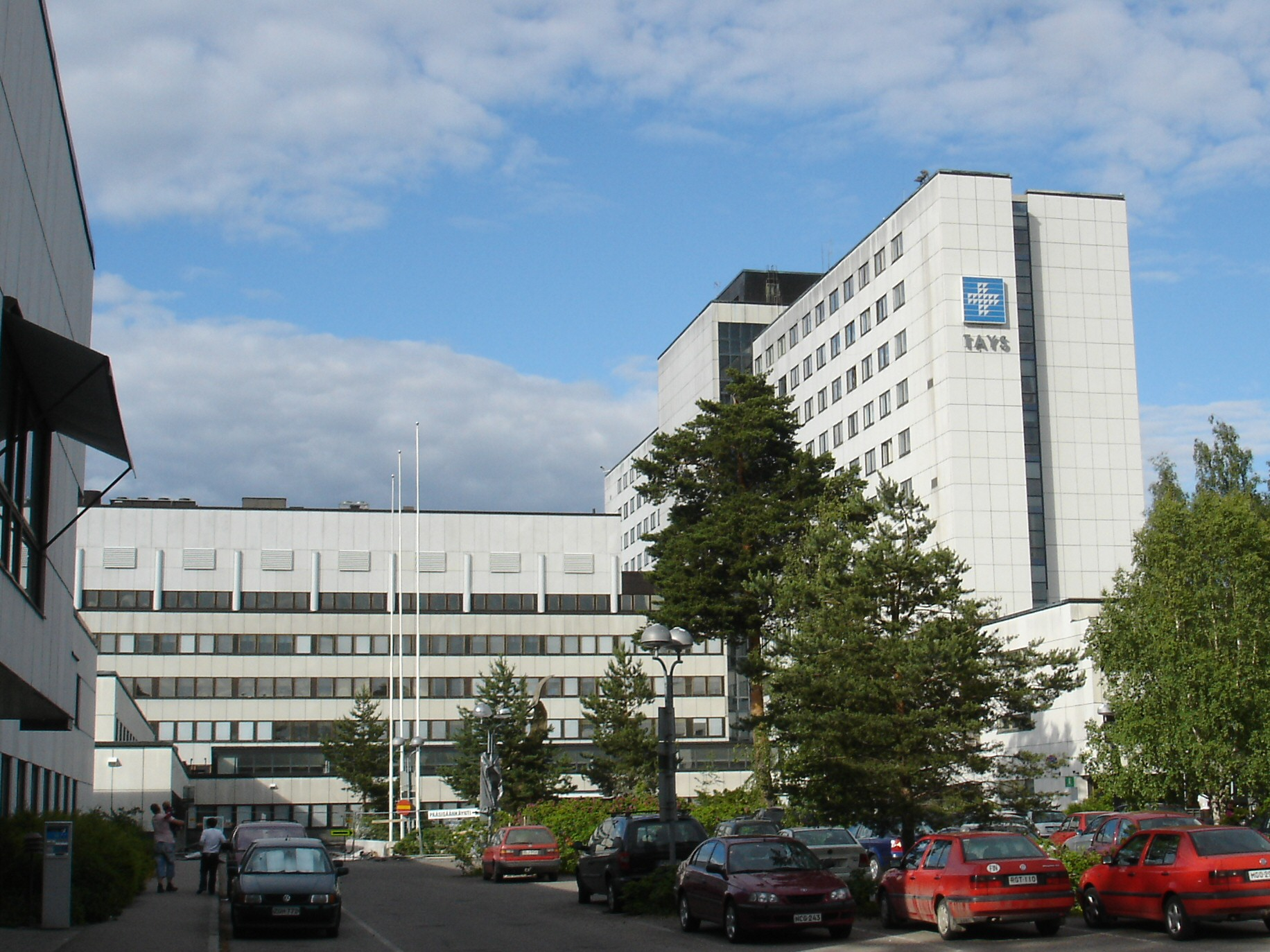
- Central Hospital Building

Geography
- Location: Teiskontie 35, Tampere, Tampere, Finland

Organisation
- Type: Teaching
- Affiliated university: Tampere University

Services
- Beds: 1,000

History
- Founded: 1962

Links
- Website: www.tays.fi
- Lists: Hospitals in Finland

Tampere University Hospital (Finnish: Tampereen yliopistollinen sairaala, TAYS, Swedish: Tammerfors universitetssjukhus) is a teaching hospital of Tampere University along Teiskontie at the Kauppi district in Tampere, Finland. It serves as one of the main hospitals in the country and operates in the facilities of Central Hospital (Keskussairaala) and Heart Hospital (Sydänsairaala) in Tampere, Pitkäniemi Hospital in Nokia, Valkeakoski Hospital in Valkeakoski and Sastamala Hospital in Sastamala.

34 medical specialties are represented at Tampere University Hospital. Most of the specialty activities take place at the Central Hospital, with more than a thousand beds and over 3,000 employees. The hospital provides services to more than 1 million Finns.

The hospital belongs to Pirkanmaa Hospital District, of which it covers 80%. The 24h emergency center of Tampere University Hospital treats patients from Tampere, Hämeenkyrö, Ikaalinen, Nokia, Orivesi, Pirkkala, Ruovesi, Sastamala, Virrat and Ylöjärvi.

Tampere University Hospital campus is the Eastern terminus of Tampere light rail. The line connects Tampere University Hospital to the city center.

Media related to Tampere University Hospital at Wikimedia Commons
