= Kauppi (district) =

City district in Tampere, Finland

Coordinates: 61°30′18″N 23°48′33″E

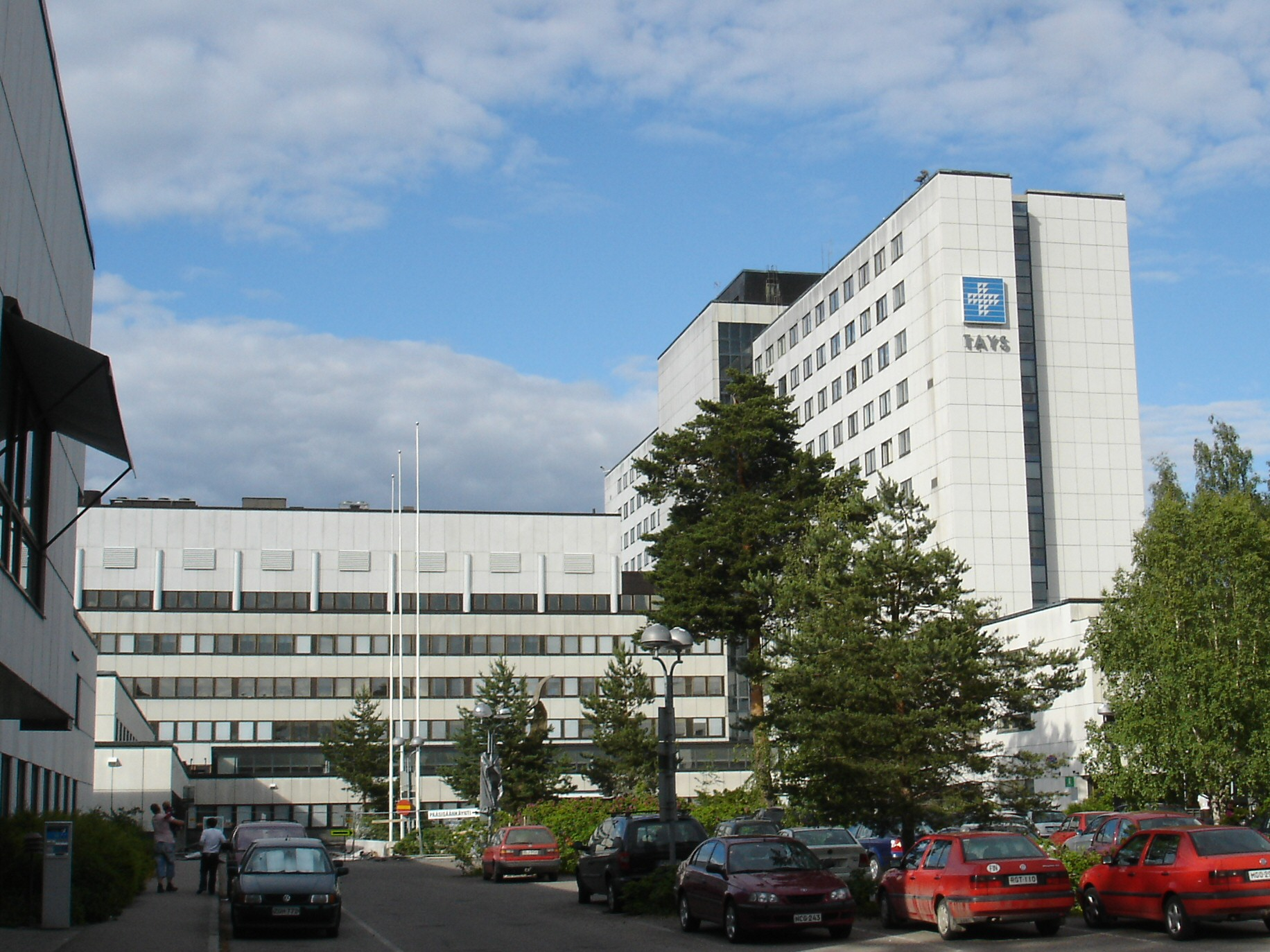
The Tampere University Hospital

Kauppi is an eastern part of the city of Tampere, Finland. It is part of larger Sampo district. The area is mostly forested and there are Finnenbahns that are cross-country ski trails in winter. The Kauppi Sports Center has a sports stadium, a greyhound track, a ski lodge, a baseball field and football pitches. The district is bordered on the north by Lake Näsijärvi, on the east by the Niihama district and on the south by Teiskontie.

The most notable landmarks in Kauppi are the Tampere University Hospital, opened in 1962; and UKK Institute, named after Urho Kekkonen, the President of Finland, whose name was often abbreviated to UKK.
