= Tampere Orthodox Church =

- Finnish: Tampereen ortodoksinen kirkko Swedish: Tammerfors ortodoxa kyrka
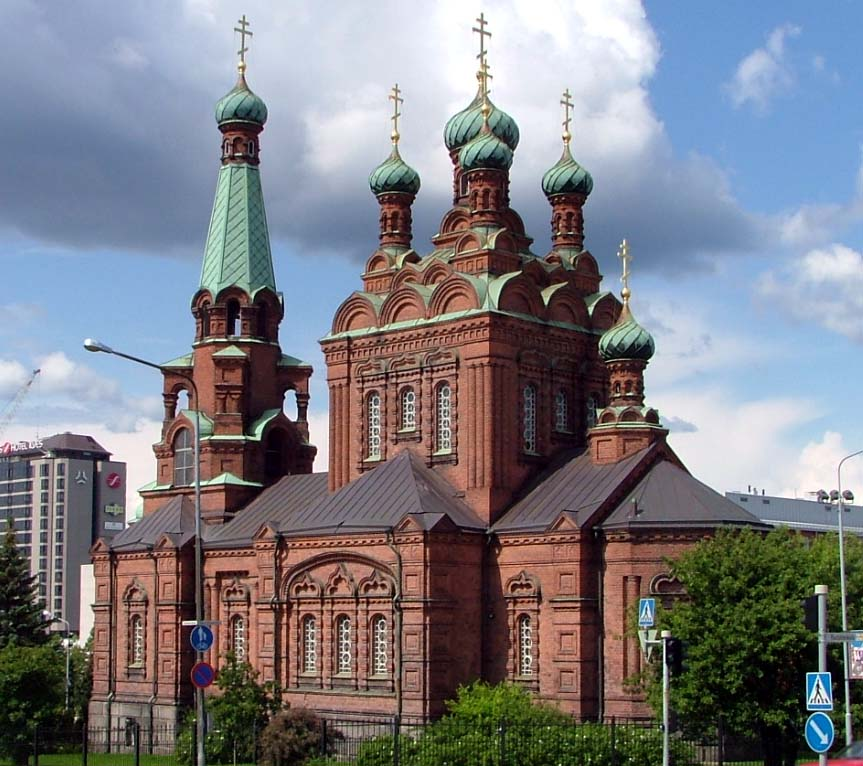
- Tampere Orthodox Church
- 61°29′43″N 23°46′19″E
- Location: Tuomiokirkonkatu 27, Kyttälä, Tampere
- Country: Finland
- Denomination: Eastern Orthodox

History
- Consecrated: 1899

Architecture
- Functional status: Active
- Architect: T. U. Yazukov
- Architectural type: Church
- Style: Russian Revival architecture

Administration
- Diocese: Helsinki
- Parish: Tampere

Tampere Orthodox Church (also known as the Church of the Alexander Nevsky and the Saint Nicholas) is an Eastern Orthodox church in Tampere, Finland, located in the Kyttälä city district. It is dedicated to Saint Alexander Nevsky and to Saint Nicholas. Tampere Orthodox Church was completed in 1899 to the design of the Russian military architect T. U. Yazukov.
