= Niihama (district) =

City district in Tampere, Finland

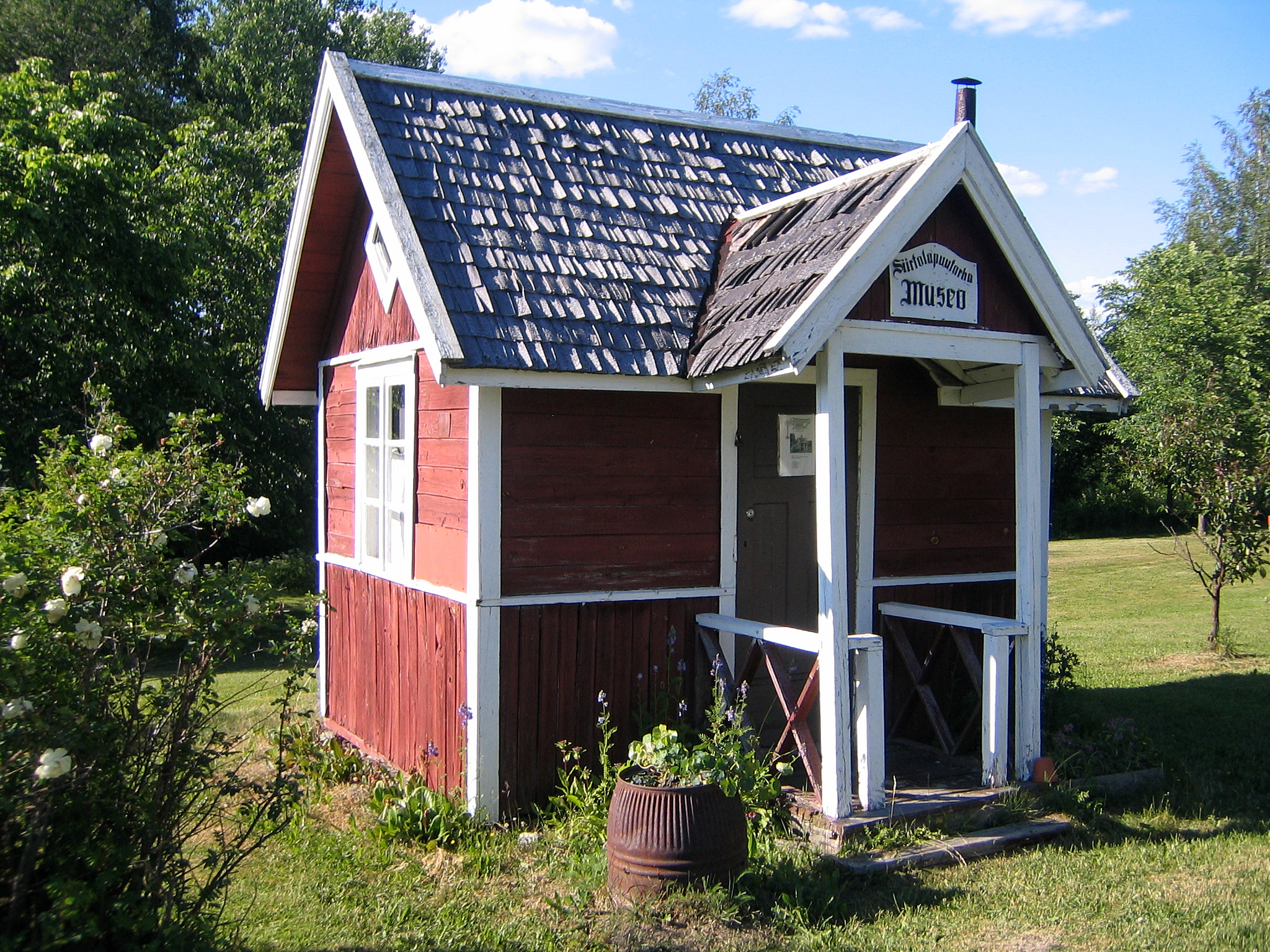
A little old cottage in an allotment garden museum in Niihama, Tampere

Niihama is a neighbourhood in the northeast part of the city of Tampere, Finland. The area is mostly wooded and mainly for outdoor use. There are cross-country ski runs in winter, and there is also a water sports center and Niihama Allotment Garden. Niihama is bordered on the west by Kauppi, on the north by Lake Näsijärvi, on the south by Teiskontie and on the east by Highway 9. The smaller lakes in the Niihama district are Lake Alasjärvi, Lake Toritunjärvi and Lake Niihamanjärvi.

The origin of the name Niihama is unknown, but is possible that the name refers to the Low German male name Nidhad or Nihhad, which is thought to be behind Nihattula in the municipality of Hattula.

Niihaman Maja, an outdoor house with a café, is located in Niihama. The house was originally a migrant farm built after the Continuation War by the Olkinuora family, who moved from Sevastyanovo, Karelian Isthmus, and the city of Tampere bought the farm from a family in the 1960s.
