= Lielahti =

City district in Tampere, Finland

Coordinates: 61°31′N 23°40′E

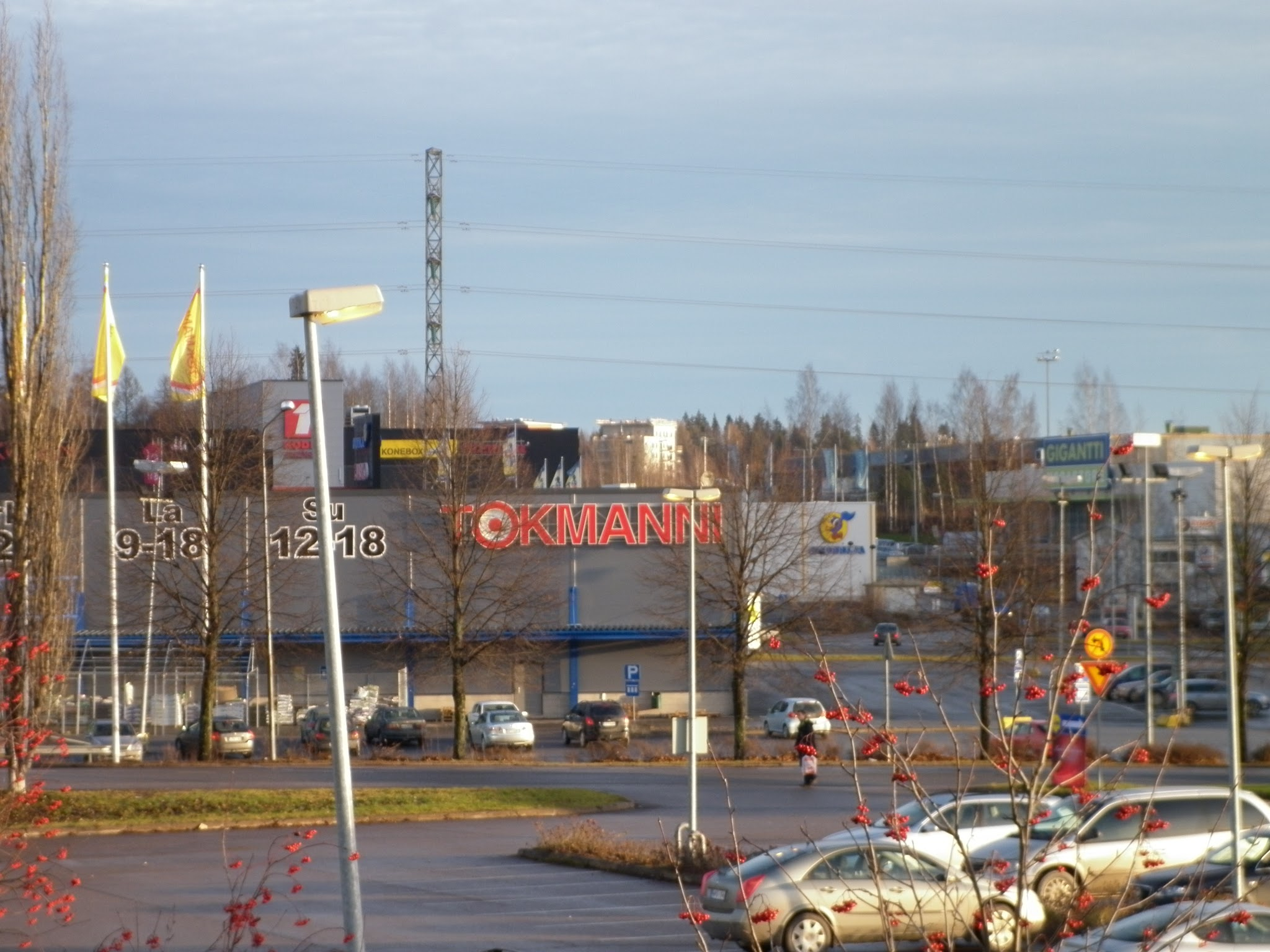
Tokmanni discount store in Lielahti

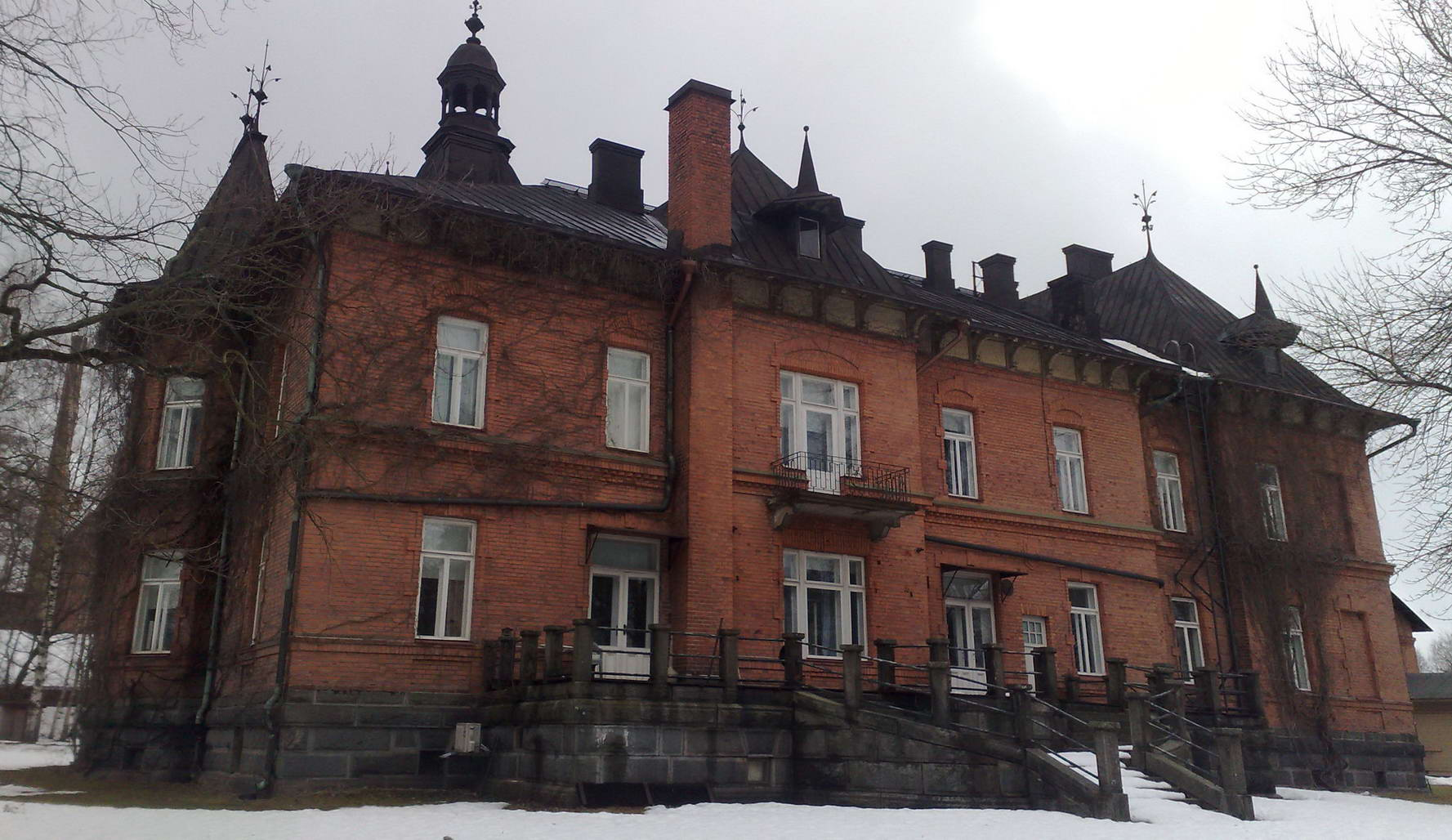
The Lielahti manor is located near the shore of lake Näsijärvi.

Lielahti (Swedish: Lielax) is a suburb in the city of Tampere, Finland, with important industrial and commercial facilities. Lielahti was annexed to the city in 1950 from Ylöjärvi parish. Lielahti lies about 7 kilometres west from the city centre.

The most prominent sight when arriving Lielahti is maybe the M-real pulp mill, which can sometimes also be sensed nasally.

There is also a railway station in Lielahti, but its use in passenger traffic was discontinued in 1984 due to its lack of passengers. It remains though as a freight station used to transport pulp even today, and its most important function is as a railway junction, since the railway tracks from Pori (Björneborg) and Seinäjoki merge there, continuing as a double-track railway to the main station of Tampere. The National Board of Antiquities has classified the Lielahti station area as a nationally significant protected site.

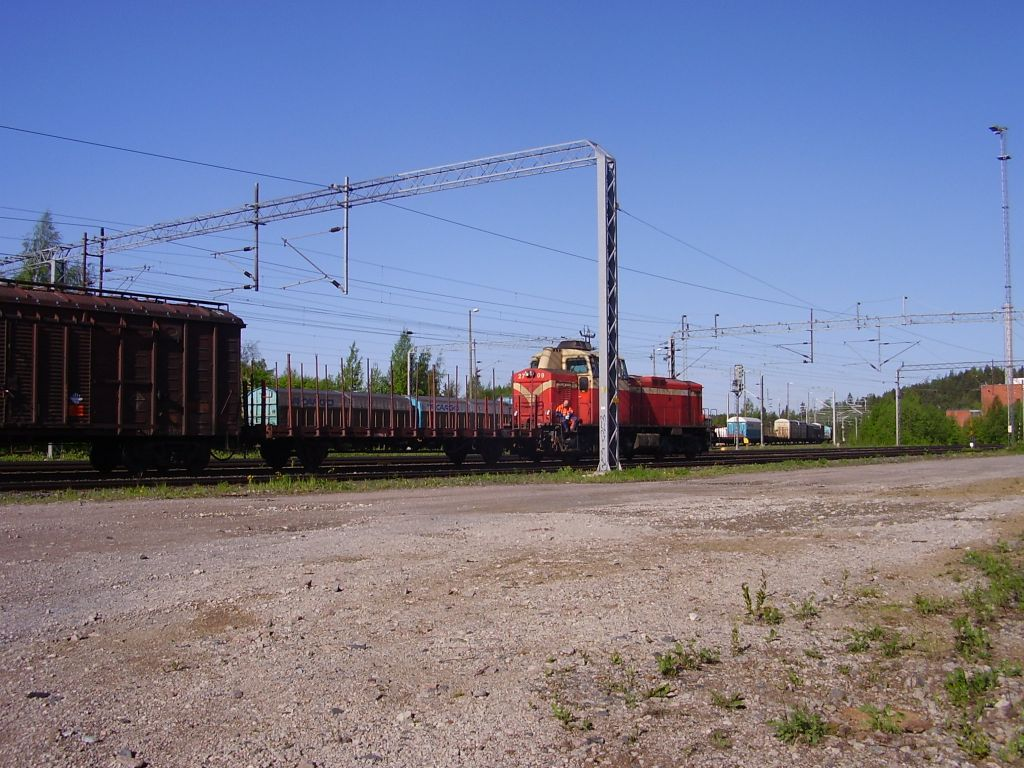
Freight trains at the Lielahti station

In the future it is quite likely that local public transport in Tampere region will again be provided by commuter trains, in a way or another. Then the trains bound from and to Nokia, and perhaps from and to Ylöjärvi will stop at the Lielahti station.

== See also ==
- Lentävänniemi
- Like (shopping mall)

== Sources ==
- Tampere.fi: Lielahden Osayleiskaava Selostus (pdf) (in Finnish)
- Seppo Randell, Näköala Vainiolta, 1997: Lielahden kaupunginosakirja. Tampere: Lielahden omakotiyhdistys ISBN 9516090621
