= Like (shopping mall) =

Like Shopping Center
- Kauppakeskus Like
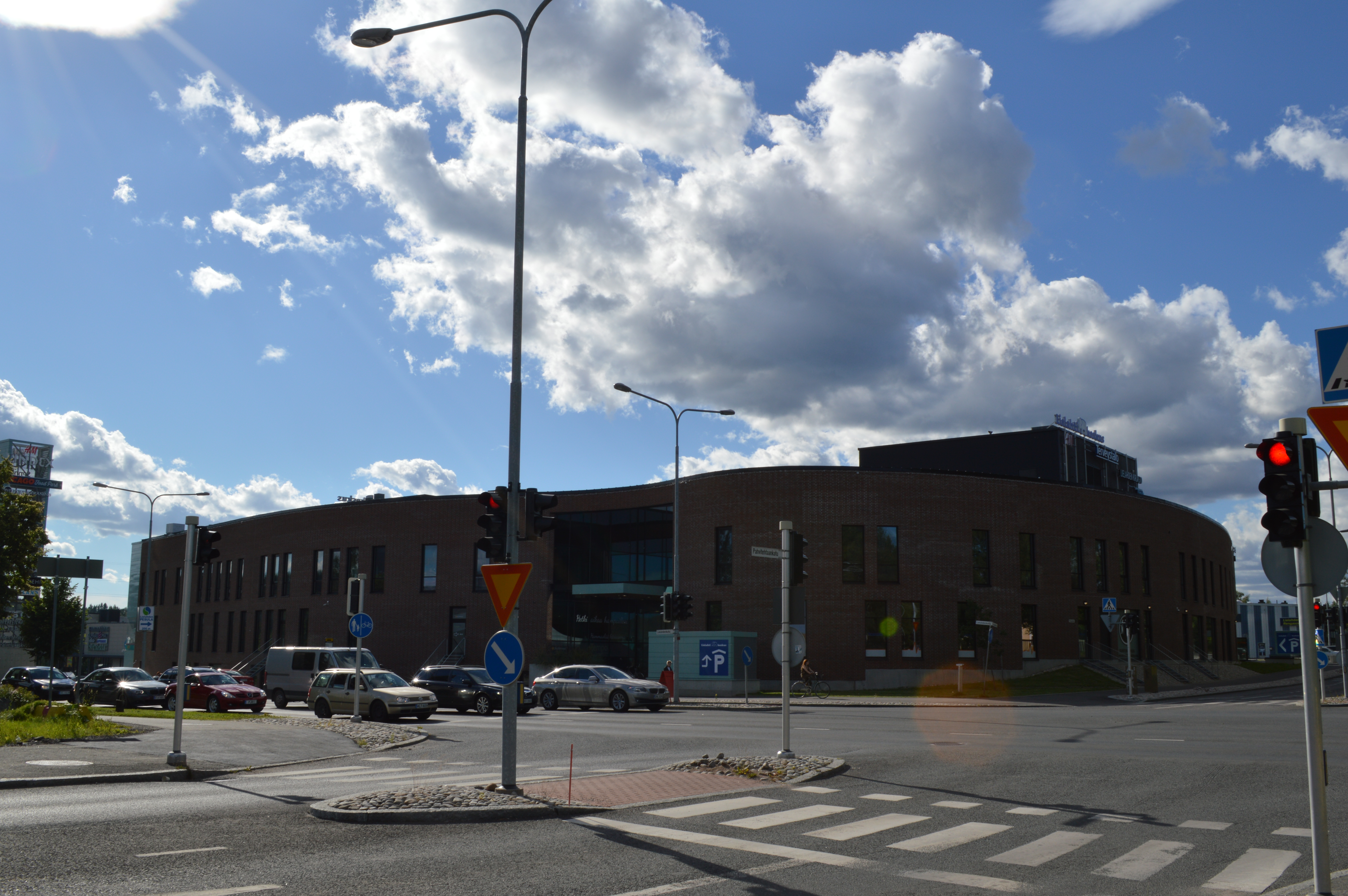
- Like Shopping Center in 2015
- Location: Lielahti, Tampere, Finland
- Coordinates: 61°31′13.23631″N 23°40′08.74103″E
- Address: Antti Possin Kuja 1
- Opened: April 24, 2014
- Owner: Keva
- Architect: Arkkitehdit A3 Oy
- Num. of anchor tenants: 12
- Floor area: 13,200 m²
- Floors: 4
- Parking: 1,200
- Website: kauppakeskuslike.fi/en/

Like (originally Lielahtikeskus) is a shopping center located in Lielahti, Tampere, Finland. The shopping center has an internal connection to the adjacent Prisma hypermarket. A special feature of the center is mentioned that the city services and commercial services operate in the same building. The first two floors have specialty shops for fashion and leisure, as well as cafés and restaurants. The top floor of the shopping center houses the public services of the city of Tampere: a library, a health center, a dental clinic, a maternity and children's clinic, as well as a service center for the elderly and a day center. There is a total of about 13,200 square meters of business and service space. About 90% of the space has been leased in the opening phase.

Lielahtikeskus is owned by Keva. Realprojekti Oy, which is part of the Ovenia Group, is responsible for the commercial management of the center. The center was built by NCC and Arkkitehtitoimisto Arkkitehdit A3 Oy. Construction began in 2012. The total value of the project was approximately EUR 50 million. The shopping center is applying for the Very Good level certificate of the international BREEAM environmental assessment system, which has already been granted to the project for the planning phase.

In September 2020, the name of the shopping center changed from Lielahtikeskus to Like.
