= Posteljooninpuisto =

Park in Tampere, Finland

Coordinates: 61°29′57″N 23°46′20″E

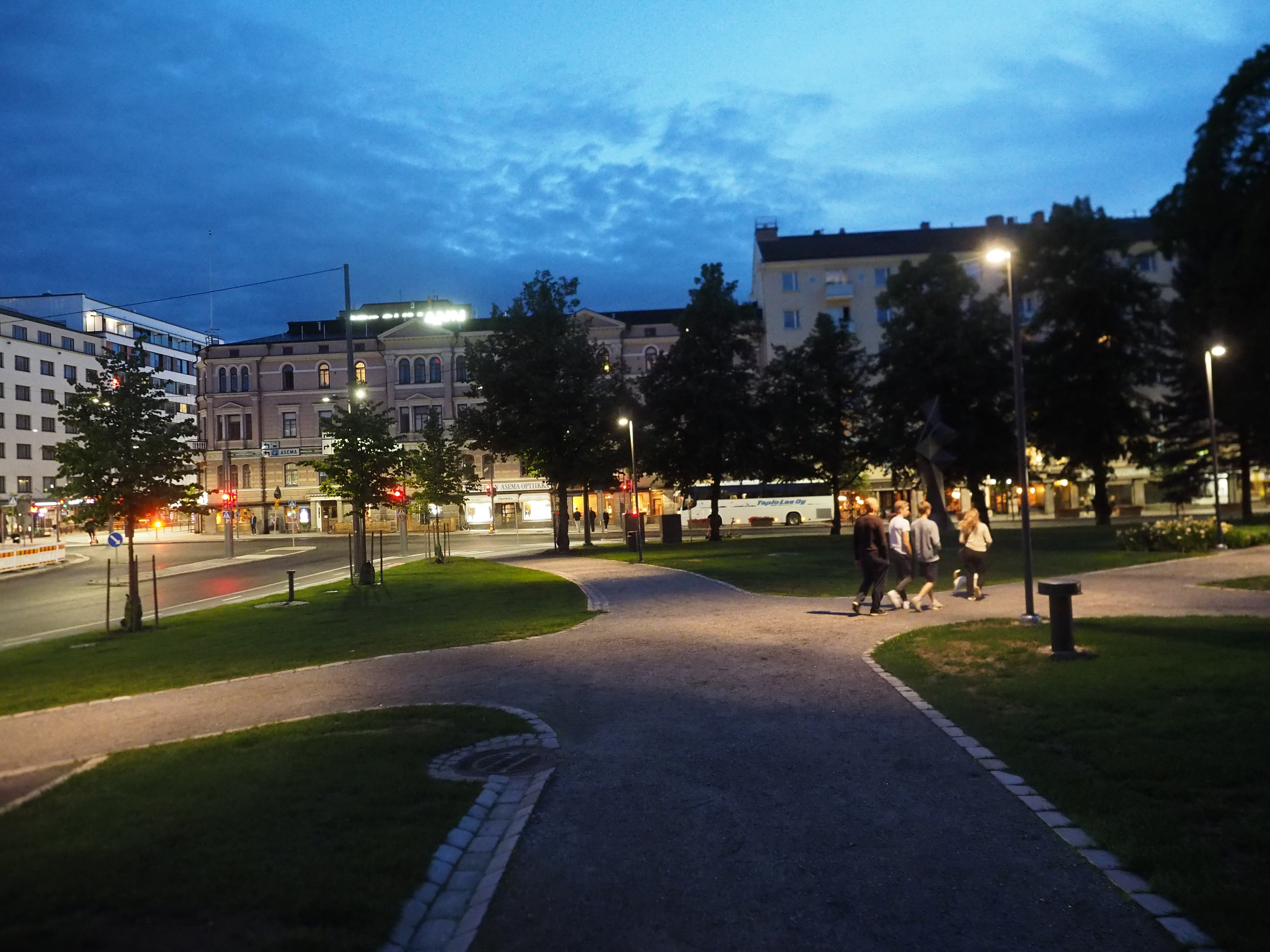
Posteljooninpuisto on a late July evening in 2020

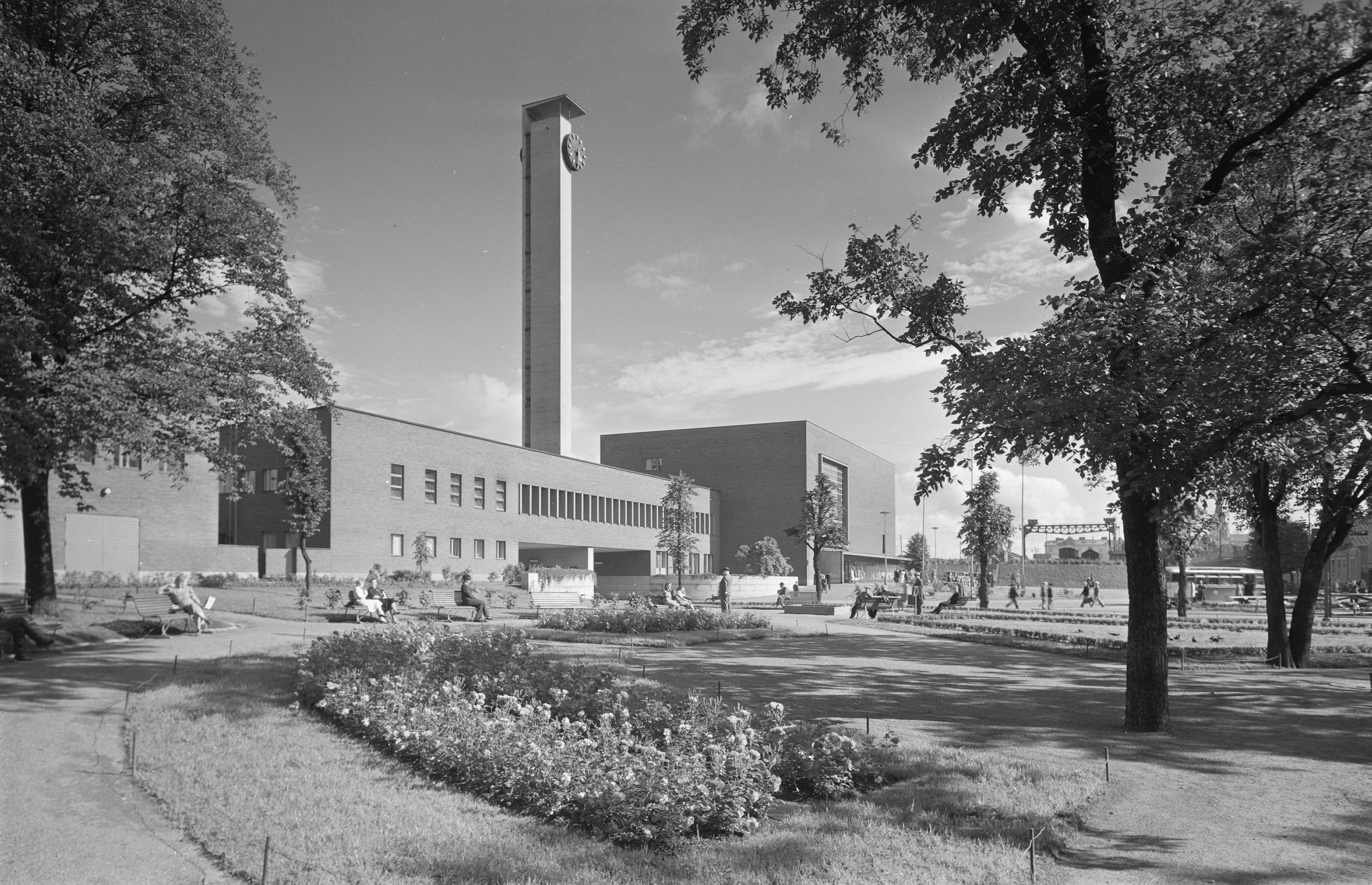
The park in 1939 with the Tampere railway station in the background

Posteljooninpuisto (Finnish for "Postman's Park") is a French formal garden style park built in the 1930s in central Tampere, Finland, at the corner of Rautatienkatu and Itsenäisyydenkatu. At the corner of the park is the former head post office of Tampere. The park is also internally connected to the Tampere railway station located next to it, which the Finnish Heritage Agency has classified as a significant cultural environment. The park is owned by the city of Tampere.

The majority of the trees at Posteljooninpuisto are deciduous. Trees planted there include common lindens. All of the lawn areas, structures of walking paths and lights were renovated from 2017 to 2018. At the same time, a pool was built underneath the park, in order to prevent urban runoff water from draining to the tunnel underneath the railway.

The steel sculpture Elämän virta ("Flow of life") designed by Aimo Taleva is located at the park. It is a memorial to the schlager and tango singer Olavi Virta, who lived his final years in Tampere.
