= Kuopio Province =

Province of Finland (1831–1997)

Coordinates: 62.8925°N 27.6783°E

Kuopio Province Kuopion lääni Kuopio län
- Province of Finland
- 1831–1997
- Coat of arms
- Capital: Kuopio
- Area
  - 1.1.1993: 19,954 km^{2} (7,704 sq mi)
- Population
  - 1.1.1993: 258,662
- History
  - Established: 1831
  - Disestablished: 1997
Preceded by	Succeeded by
County of Savolax and Karelia	Northern Karelia Province; Eastern Finland Province

The Kuopio Province (Finnish: Kuopion lääni, Swedish: Kuopio län, Russian: Куопиоская губерния) was a province of Finland from 1831 to 1997. The province was named after its capital, city of Kuopio.

== History ==
The predecessor of province was the County of Savolax and Karelia, which was established in 1775 when Finland was integrated part of Sweden.

As a consequence of the tumultuous conflicts of the Napoleonic Wars, Sweden had allied itself with the Russian Empire, United Kingdom and the other parties of the Fourth Coalition against Napoleonic France. However, following the treaty of Treaty of Tilsit in 1807, Russia made peace with France and left the coalition. This enabled Russia in 1808 to challenge Sweden in the Finnish War, over the control of Finland. In the Treaty of Fredrikshamn on September 17, 1809 Sweden was obliged to cede all its territory in Finland, east of the Torne River, to Russia.

The ceded territories became a part of the Russian Empire and were reconstituted into the Grand Duchy of Finland, with the Russian Tsar as the Grand Duke. At first there wasn't any changes in the County of Savolax and Karelia, which was now a province in the autonomous Grand Duchy. Kuopio Province was established in 1831 from this province, while its southern parts were transferred to the new Mikkeli Province.

In 1960 the eastern part of the Kuopio province was separated as the Northern Karelia Province. In 1997 the province was reunited with Northern Karelia and together they merged with the Mikkeli Province, to establish the new Eastern Finland Province.

== Maps ==
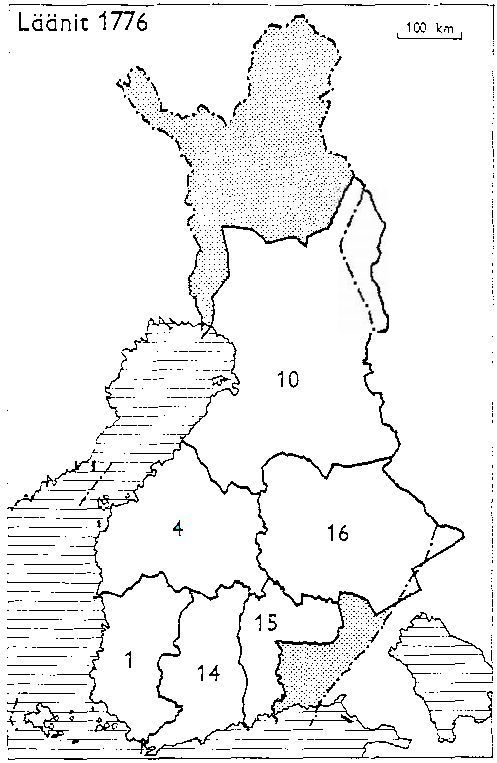
Provinces of Finland 1776: 1: Turku and Pori, 4: Vaasa, 10: Oulu, 14: Nyland and Tavastehus, 15: Kymmenegård, 16: Savolax and Karelia

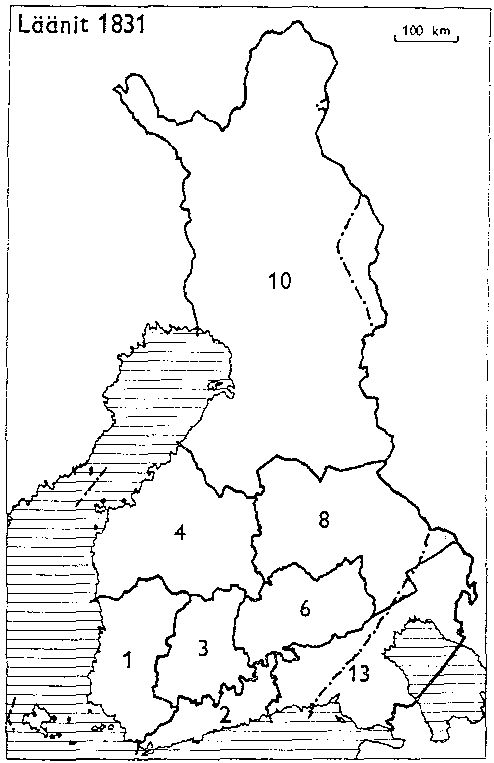
Provinces of Finland 1831: 1: Turku and Pori, 2: Uusimaa, 3: Häme, 4: Vaasa, 6: Mikkeli, 8: Kuopio, 10: Oulu, 13: Viipuri

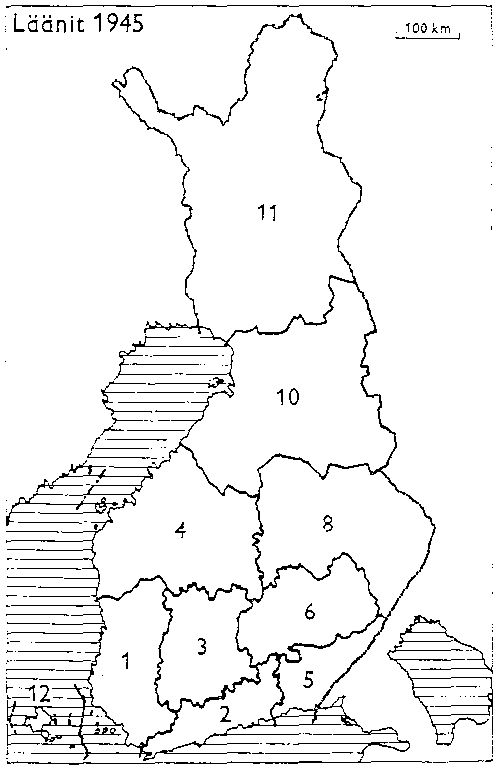
Provinces of Finland 1945: 1: Turku and Pori, 2: Uusimaa, 3: Häme, 4: Vaasa, 5: Kymi, 6: Mikkeli, 8: Kuopio, 10: Oulu, 11: Lapland, 12: Åland

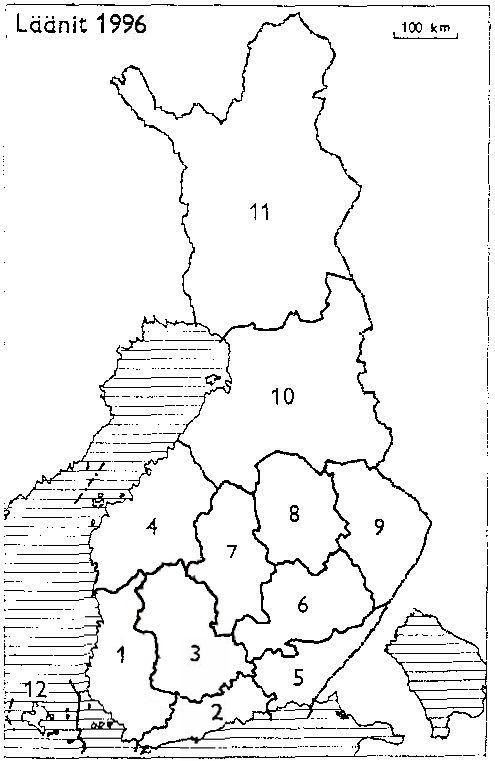
Provinces of Finland 1996: 1: Turku and Pori, 2: Uusimaa, 3: Häme, 4: Vaasa, 5: Kymi, 6: Mikkeli, 7: Central Finland, 8: Kuopio, 9: Northern Karelia, 10: Oulu, 11: Lapland, 12: Åland

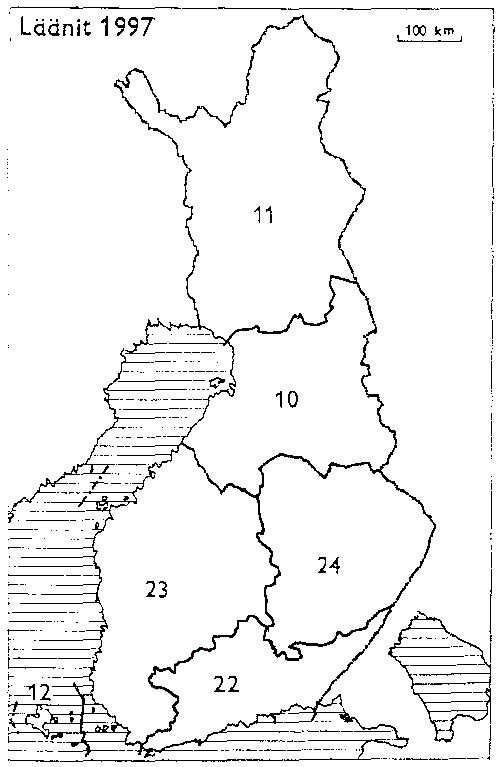
Provinces of Finland 1997: 10: Oulu, 11: Lapland, 12: Åland, 22: Southern Finland, 23: Western Finland, 24: Eastern Finland

== Municipalities in 1997 (cities in bold) ==
- **Iisalmi**
- Juankoski
- Kaavi
- Karttula
- Keitele
- **Kiuruvesi**
- **Kuopio**
- Lapinlahti
- Leppävirta
- Maaninka
- Nilsiä
- Pielavesi
- Rautalampi
- Rautavaara
- Siilinjärvi
- Sonkajärvi
- **Suonenjoki**
- Tervo
- Tuusniemi
- **Varkaus**
- Varpaisjärvi
- Vehmersalmi
- Vesanto
- Vieremä

== Former municipalities (disestablished before 1997) ==
- Kuopion maalaiskunta
- Muuruvesi
- Pielisensuu
- Pälkjärvi
- Riistavesi
- Säyneinen

== Governors ==
- Lars Sackleen 1831–1833
- Gustaf Adolf Ramsay 1833–1854
- Berndt Federley 1854–1855
- Sten Knut Johan Furuhjelm 1855–1862
- Samuel Henrik Antell 1862–1866
- Johan August von Essen 1866–1873
- Carl Gustaf Mortimer von Kraemer 1873–1884
- August Alexander Järnefelt 1884–1888
- Johan Fredrik Gustaf Aminoff 1888–1899
- Henrik Åkerman 1899–1900
- Edvard Gabriel Krogius 1900–1903
- Martin Alexius Bergh (Martti Vuori) 1903–1905
- Emil Wilhelm Stenius 1905–1911
- Werner Nikolaus Tavaststjerna 1911–1913
- Arthur Spåre 1913–1917
- Albert von Hellens 1917–1918
- Gustaf Ignatius 1918–1940
- Pekka Heikkinen 1940–1950
- Lauri Riikonen 1950–1960
- Erkki O. Mantere 1960–1966
- Risto Hölttä 1966–1978
- Kauko Hjerppe 1978–1993
- Olavi Martikainen 1993–1997

== See also ==
- State Provincial Office of Kuopio
