= Koillis-Savo =

- Type: Newspaper
- Publisher: Savon Media Oy
- Editor-in-chief: Minna-Liisa Mathalt
- Founded: 1963; 62 years ago
- Political alignment: Independent
- Language: Finnish
- Headquarters: Kaavi
- Circulation: 4,891 (2017)
- ISSN: 1236-8407
- Website: Koillis-Savo

Koillis-Savo is a newspaper that is published by Savon Media Oy. It is established in 1963.

Koillis Savo is published every Thursday in Kaavi and Tuusniemi in North Savo, also in Juankoski and Riistavesi areas. Circulation was 4,891 in 2017.
