= Trident =

Three-prong spear

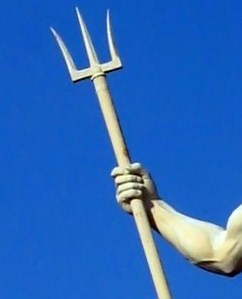
Trident of Poseidon

A trident (/ˈtraɪdənt/) is a three-pronged spear. It is used for spear fishing and historically as a polearm. As compared to an ordinary spear, the three tines increase the chance that a fish will be struck and decrease the chance that a fish will be able to dislodge itself if struck badly. On the other hand, they are not so many as to overly reduce the spear's concentration of force for piercing.

The trident is the tool of Poseidon (Greek) or Neptune (Roman) used for the protection of the sea realms by the god of the sea in classical mythology. Other sea deities such as Amphitrite or Triton were also often depicted with a trident in classical art. Later, tridents were used in medieval heraldry, sometimes held by a merman or triton. In Hinduism, it is the weapon of Shiva and is known as a trishula (Sanskrit for "triple-spear"). It is also associated with the superhero Aquaman. The trident is an important military (especially naval) symbol as an element for forces such as the Hellenic Navy, United States Navy SEALs, United States Naval Academy, Cyprus Navy, and the Nepali Army. It is included in many logos including the corporate logos of Maserati and Club Med and the athletic logos of Manchester United F.C. and Arizona State University.

== Etymology ==
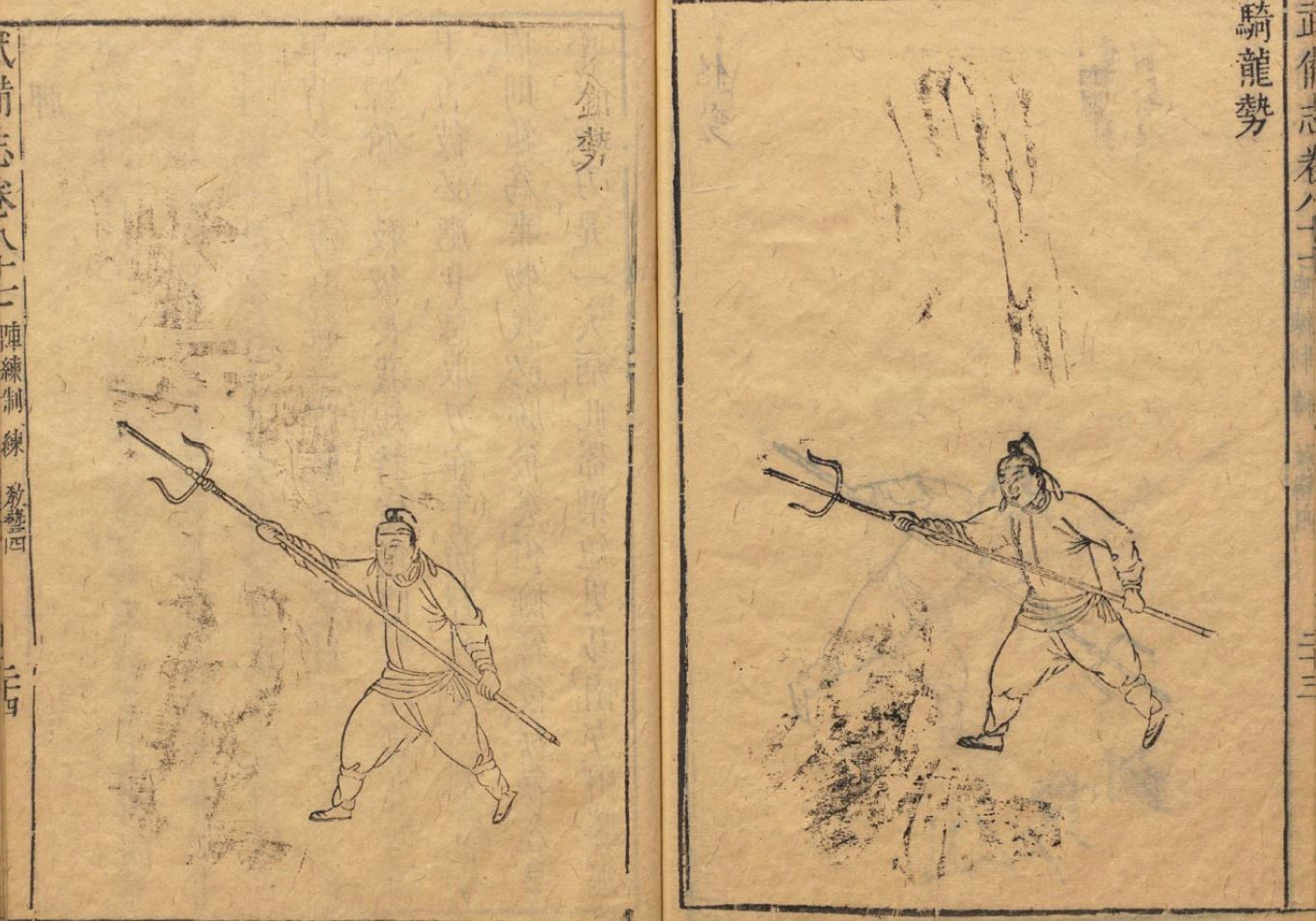
Illustration of a trident user from the Wubei Zhi, late 16th to early 17th century

The word "trident" comes from the Latin word tridens or tridentis: tri meaning "three" and dentes meaning "teeth", referring specifically to the three prongs, or "teeth", of the weapon.

The Greek equivalent is τρίαινα (tríaina), from Proto-Greek trianja, meaning "threefold". The Greek term does not imply three of anything specific, and is vague about the shape, thus the assumption it was originally of "trident" form has been challenged.

Latin fuscina also means "trident".

The Sanskrit name for the trident, trishula, is a compound of tri त्रि for "three" and śūla शूल for "thorn", calling the trident's three prongs "thorns" rather than "teeth" or dant in Sanskrit, making the word "Tridant" for trident.

== Mythology and art ==
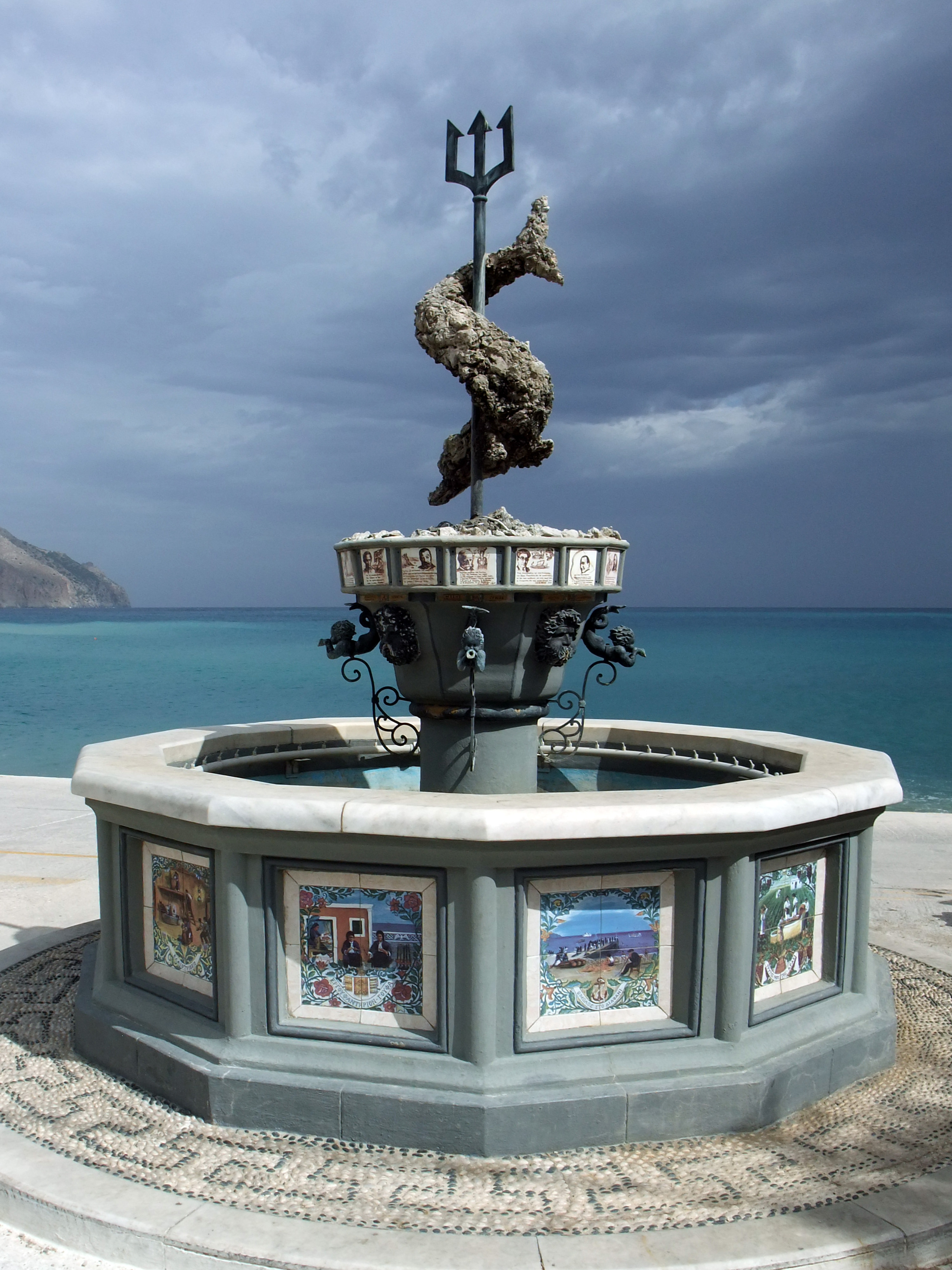
Fountain of Neptune in Diafáni, Karpathos island

=== Poseidon ===
The trident is associated with the sea god Poseidon. This divine instrument is said to have been forged by the cyclopes.

Poseidon struck a rock with his trident, causing a sea (or a saltwater spring, called the Erechtheis) to appear nearby on the Acropolis in Athens. And according to Roman sources, Neptune struck the earth with the trident to produce the first warhorse.

Poseidon, as well as being the god of the sea, was also known as the "Earth Shaker", believed to cause earthquakes; (Note: Mackay catalogs instances in classical literature where Poseidon is connected with the earthquake, but does not cite use of the trident in any, only mentioning its use in creating the horse.) some commentators have extrapolated that the god would have used the trident to cause them, possibly by striking the earth.

In the Renaissance artist Gian Bernini's sculpture Neptune and Triton (1622–23), Neptune is posed holding a trident turned downwards, and is thought to reenact a scene from Aeneid or Ovid's Metamorphoses where he is calming the waves to aid Aeneas's ships.

=== Other sea divinities ===
In later Greek and Roman art and literature, other sea deities and their attendants have been depicted holding the trident.

Poseidon's consort Amphitrite is often identified by some marine attribute other than a trident, which she never carries according to some scholars, though other commentators have disagreed. (Note: The helmeted goddess bearing a trident has been identified as Amphitrite by Montfaucon in a carved carnelian in the collection of Maréchal d'Estrées.)

Turning to the retinue or a train of beings which follow the sea deities (the marine thiasos) the Tritons (mermen) may be seen bearing tridents. Likewise, the Old Man of the Sea (halios geron) and the god Nereus are seen holding tridents. Tritons, other mermen, and the Nereides can also carry rudders, oars, fish, or dolphins.

Oceanus normally should not carry a trident, allowing him to be clearly distinguished from Poseidon. However, there is conflation of the deities in Romano-British iconography, and examples exist where the crab-claw headed Oceanus also bears a trident. (Note: Oceanus Mosaic from Withington; The "pavement from Ashcroft Villas, Cirencester" is also mentioned.) Oceanus holding a trident has been found on Romano-British coinage as well. (Note: The reverse side on the denarius of Carausius, acquired by the British Museum in 1998.)

Some amorini have been depicted carrying tiny tridents. (Note: Porta Capena mosaics, Rome. In the center is a square with geometric design (star inscribed in circle), and there are four diagonal spokes from it in the shape of a trident.)

The trident is even seen suspended like a pendant on a dolphin in Roman mosaic art. (Note: Villa della Pisanella, Boscoreale, Italy.)

=== Hindu religion ===
In Hindu legends and stories Shiva, the Hindu god uses a trishula as his principal weapon. The trident is also said to represent three gunas mentioned in Indian Vedic philosophy namely sāttvika, rājasika, and tāmasika. The goddess Kali is sometimes portrayed with a trident as well.

A weapon of South-East Asian (particularly Thai) depiction of Hanuman, a character of Ramayana.

=== Miscellaneous ===
In religious Taoism, the trident represents the Taoist Trinity, the Three Pure Ones. In Taoist rituals, a trident bell is used to invite the presence of deities and summon spirits, as the trident signifies the highest authority of Heaven.

A trident in the coat of arms of Riistavesi.

In heraldry within the UK, the trident is often held by the figure identified as either a Neptune or a triton, (Note: Burke assigns trident to Neptune and Eve to Triton. Eve states the Triton is "sometimes called Neptune", while Burke cross-references "merman" to "Neptune".) or a merman. (Note: Thomas Moule, among others write "triton, or merman" implying interchangeability of these terms.)

The trident held up by an arm is depicted on some coats-of-arms.

== Use ==
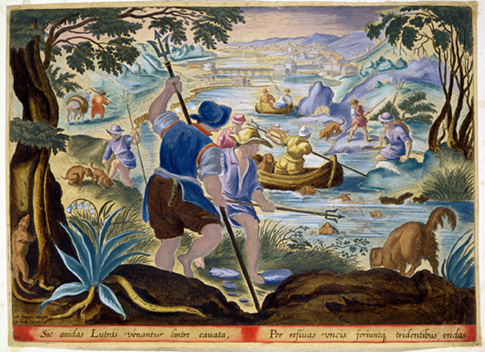
Dutch fishermen using tridents in the 17th century.

=== Fishing ===
In Ancient Greece, the trident was employed as a harpoon for spearing large fish, especially tuna fishing.

Tridents used in modern spear-fishing usually have barbed tines, which trap the speared fish firmly. In the Southern and Midwestern United States, gigging is used for harvesting suckers, bullfrogs, flounder and many species of rough fish.

=== Agriculture ===
It has been used by farmers as a decorticator to remove leaves, seeds and buds from the stalks of plants such as flax and hemp. A form of trident is used by the gardians in the Camargue of southern France for herding cattle.

=== Combat ===
In Ancient Rome tridents (Latin: tridens or fuscina) were used by a type of gladiator called a retiarius or "net fighter". The retiarius was traditionally pitted against a secutor, and cast a net to wrap his adversary and then used the trident to fight him.

Tridents were also used in medieval heraldry.

The trident, known as dangpa, is used as a weapon in the 17th- to 18th-century systems of Korean martial arts.

== Modern symbolism ==
The glyph or sigil of the planet Neptune (♆), which alludes to the trident, is used in astronomy and astrology.

=== Political ===
Coat of arms of Ukraine.

The flag of Barbados incorporates a Trident.

- The Tryzub in the Coat of Arms of Ukraine, adopted in 1918 (in a reinterpretation of a medieval emblem which is traced to the Volodymyr the Great.
- The national and presidential flags of Barbados.
- The "forks of the people's anger", adopted by the Russian anti-Soviet revolutionary organization, National Alliance of Russian Solidarists (NTS).
- Britannia, the personification of Great Britain usually depicted to hold a trident.

=== Civilian use ===
- The symbol for Washington and Lee University (see *Washington and Lee Generals)
- King Triton, the mascot of the University of California, San Diego, holds a trident, and the trident is omnipresent in UCSD’s athletic gear (See UC San Diego Tritons)
- The symbol (since June 2008) for the athletic teams (Tritons) at the University of Missouri–St. Louis (UMSL Tritons).
- Sparky the Sun Devil, the mascot of Arizona State University, holds a trident. ASU recently redesigned its trident as a stand-alone symbol (See Arizona State Sun Devils)
- The trident was used as the original cap insignia and original logo for the Seattle Mariners. Although the Mariners changed their cap insignia & logo away from a trident theme in 1993, the club allows players to use a trident as a prop after hitting home runs during games. The trident prop used by the team is a replica from the 2018 film Aquaman.
- An element on the flag of the Sea Shepherd Conservation Society.
- The Maserati logo.
- Club Méditerranée.
- The Hawker Siddeley Trident, a 1960s British three-engine jet airliner.
- The Tirreno–Adriatico cycle race trophy.
- The exterior of the World Trade Center used three-pronged decorative and structural elements at its base, commonly referred to as "tridents".
- Manchester United F.C.
- Crawley Town F.C.
- Fredonia Blue Devils
- Tampa Bay Tritons
- White Rock Tritons
- Nkana F.C.

=== Military insignia ===
Emblem of the Hellenic Navy

- The emblem of the Hellenic Navy
- The emblem of the Cyprus Navy
- The insignia of Nepal Army
- With Poseidon in the 31st Brigade.
- The symbol of the Swedish Coastal Rangers, Kustjägarna.
- The trident is a recurring element in the colours of certain units of the Finnish Navy.
- The United States Naval Special Warfare Command, and the Special Warfare insignia, particularly worn by members of the US Navy SEALs, and containing a trident representing the three aspects (Sea, Air, and Land) of SEAL special operations.
- Part of the golden-colored crest of the United States Naval Academy, which depicts a trident running vertically in its background. In addition, the Naval Academy’s motto, Ex scientia tridens, literally translates from Latin as "From knowledge, a trident", though the official translation is "From knowledge, seapower" (i.e. using the association of the trident with Poseidon/Neptune and other sea gods as a metaphor for naval might).
- The ship's crests of 13 of the 18 Ohio-class submarines of the U.S. Navy prominently feature tridents, as both a symbol of maritime power, and in reference to their payloads of Trident D-5 missiles.
- The rating badge of the United States Coast Guard Marine Science Technician.
- The Tug Banner used by Mongolian Honor guards.
- The insignia of the German commando force, Kampfschwimmer.
- The rating badge of the United States Navy Ocean Systems Technician (OT)

== Botanical nomenclature ==
A number of structures in the biological world are described as trident in appearance. Since at least the late 19th century the trident shape was applied to certain botanical shapes; for example, certain orchid flora were described as having trident-tipped lips in early botanical works. Furthermore, in current botanical literature, certain bracts are stated to have a trident-shape (e.g. Douglas-fir).

== Gallery ==
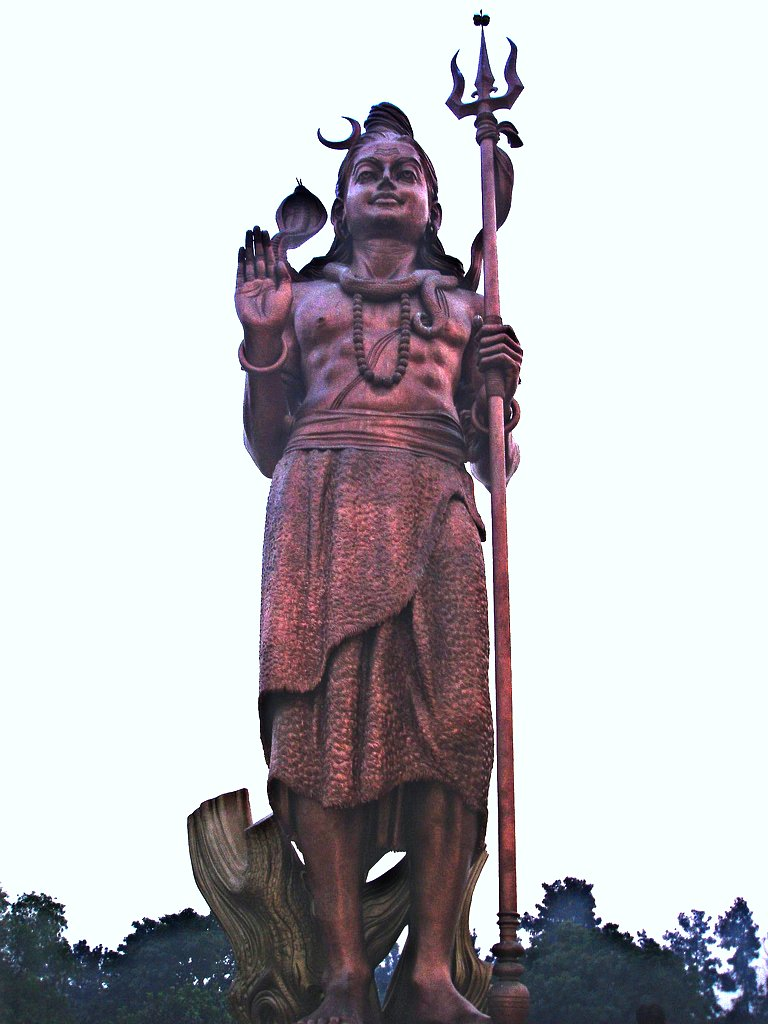
A statue of Hindu God Shiva, holding a trishula, near Indira Gandhi International Airport, Delhi

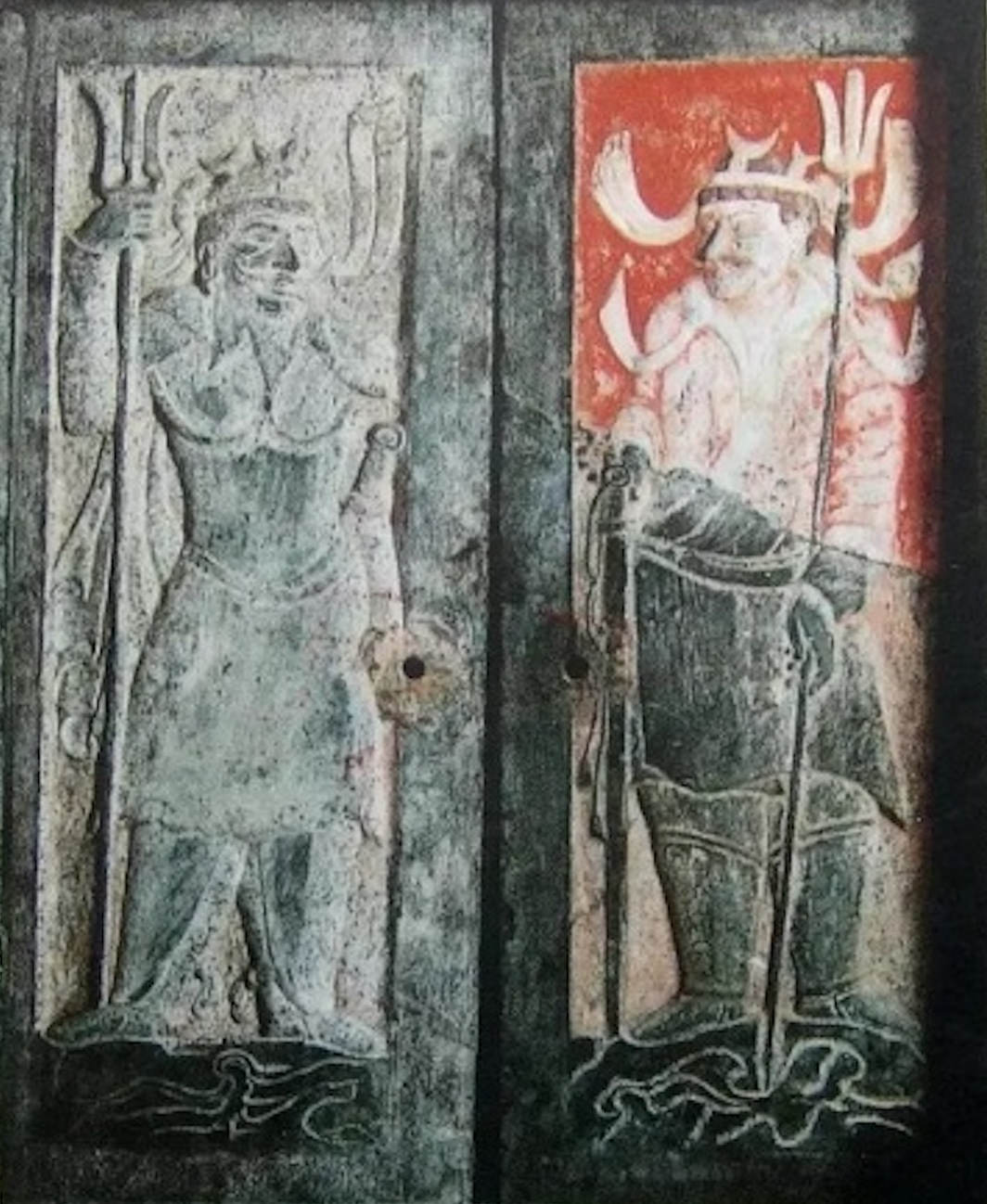
Two guardian deities of an ancient Chinese tomb, both holding tridents

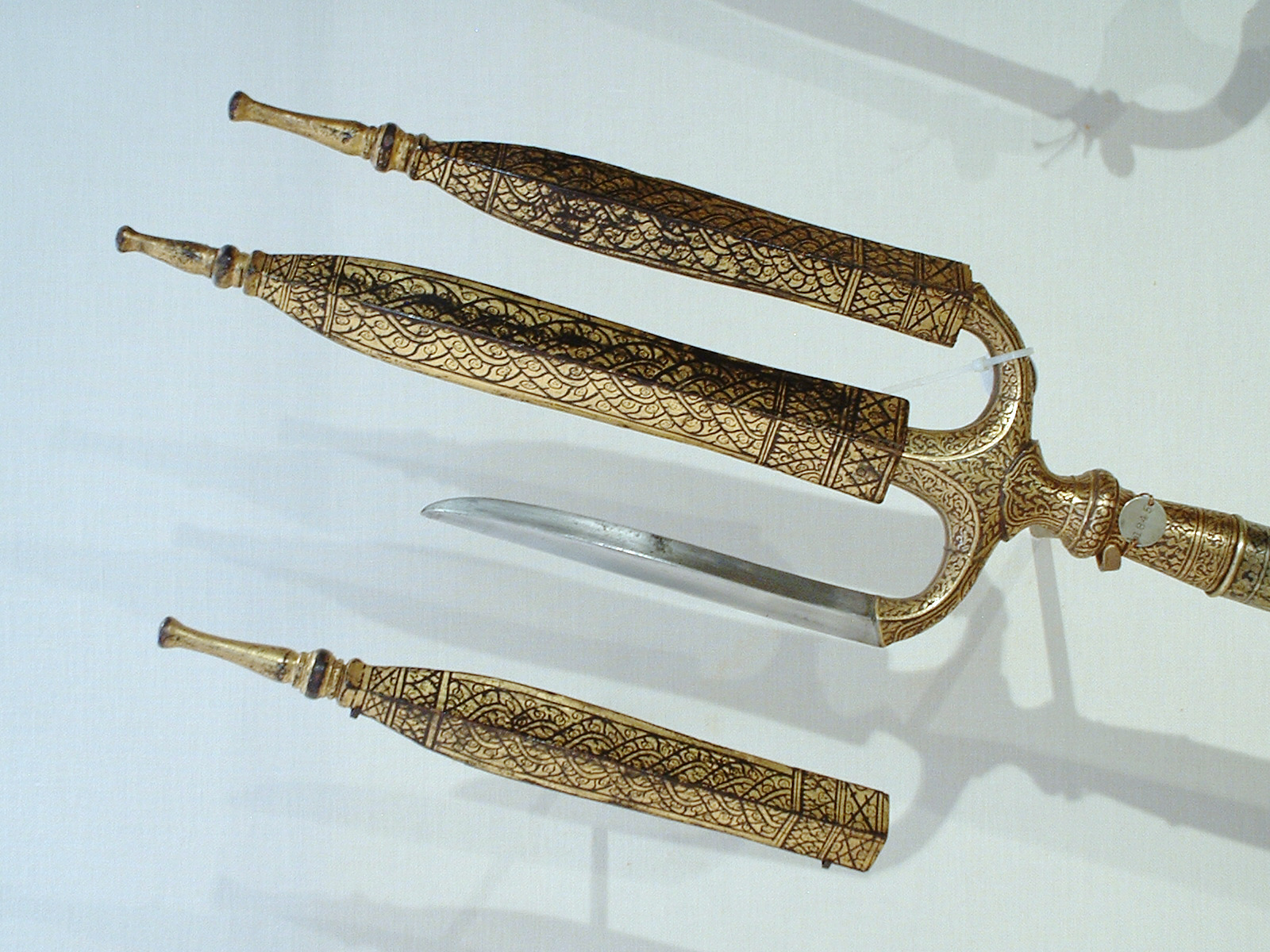
18th-century trident from Thailand

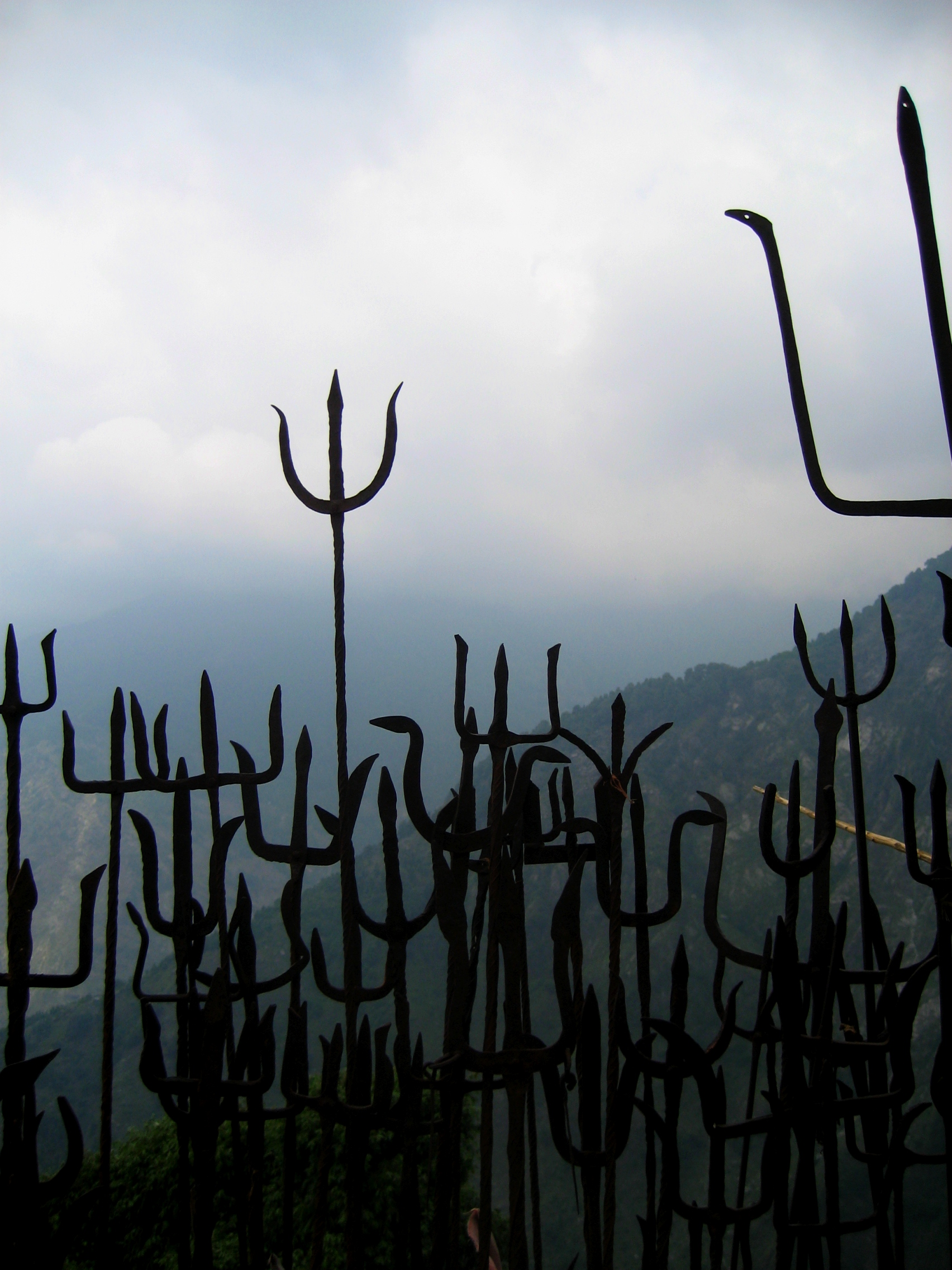
Tridents (trishula) brought as offerings to Guna Devi, near Dharamsala, Himachal Pradesh, India

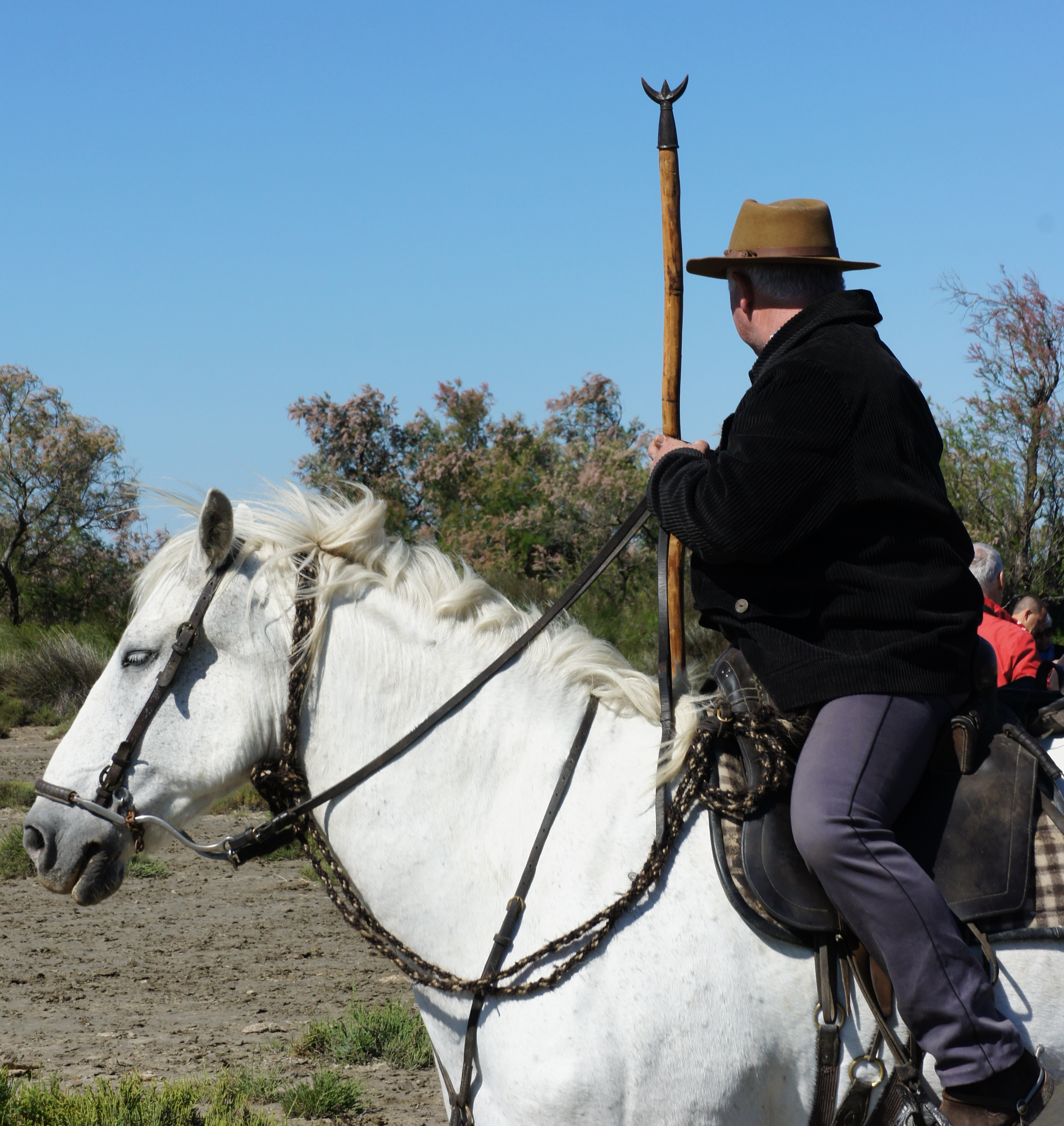
Camargue trident in France

== See also ==
- Bident
- Eighteen Arms of Wushu
- Leister
- Military fork
- Pitchfork
- Sai
- Trishula
- Symbols of the Rurikids
- Trident (UK nuclear programme)
- Tug (banner)
