= Kallavesi (Mäntyharju) =

Lake in the country of Finland

Kallavesi (Ristiina)
- Location within Finland
- Coordinates: 61.40°N 27.105°E
- Type: Lake
- Catchment area: Kymijoki
- Basin countries: Finland
- Surface area: 13.967 km^{2} (5.393 sq mi)
- Average depth: 8.63 m (28.3 ft)
- Max. depth: 37.85 m (124.2 ft)
- Water volume: 0.121 km^{3} (98,000 acre⋅ft)
- Shore length^{1}: 122.41 km (76.06 mi)
- Surface elevation: 81.5 m (267 ft)
- Frozen: December–April
- Settlements: Mäntyharju
- ^{1} Shore length is not a well-defined measure.

Kallavesi (Ristiina) is a medium-sized lake in the Kymijoki main catchment area. It is located in the region of Southern Savonia in Finland. In Finland there are two lakes with this name, and the lake Kallavesi in Kuopio is much bigger.

== See also ==
- List of lakes in Finland
