= Damned Soul =

Sculpture by Gianlorenzo Bernini

- Anima damnata (Latin)
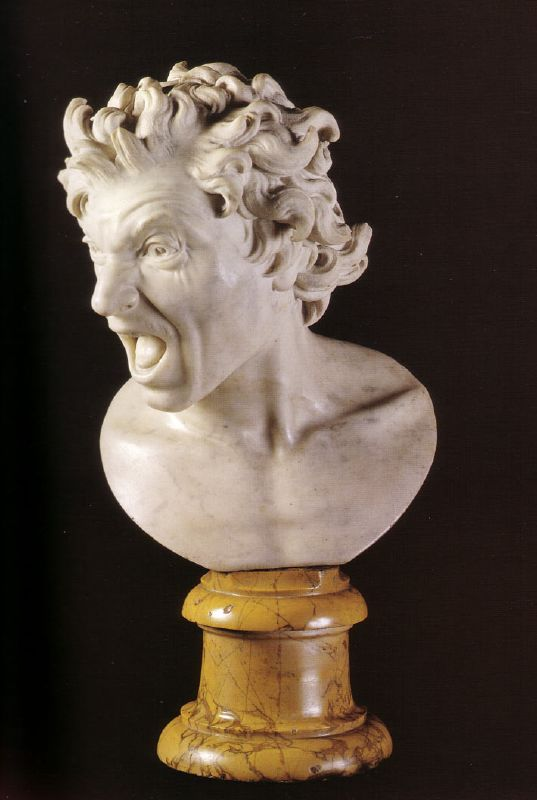
- Artist: Gian Lorenzo Bernini
- Year: 1619
- Catalogue: 7
- Type: Sculpture
- Medium: Marble
- Dimensions: Life-size
- Location: Palace of Spain; Rome
- Preceded by: Bust of Pope Paul V
- Followed by: Blessed Soul (Bernini)

Damned Soul (Italian: Anima dannata) is a marble sculpture bust by the Italian artist Gian Lorenzo Bernini as a pendant piece to his Blessed Soul. According to Rudolf Wittkower, the sculpture is in the Palazzo di Spagna in Rome. This may well be what is known today as the Palazzo Monaldeschi.

There is a bronze copy, executed by Massimiliano Soldani Benzi some time between 1705 and 1707, in the Liechtenstein Collection.

Recent scholarship on the sculpture has queried whether its topic is not the Christian personifications of pain (possibly inspired by prints by Karel van Mallery), but a depiction of a satyr.

== See also ==
- List of works by Gian Lorenzo Bernini
