= Olavi Martikainen =

Finnish politician

Veikko Olavi Martikainen (born 25 July 1941, in Lapinlahti) is a Finnish farmer and politician. He was Deputy Minister of Social Affairs and Health from 15 May 1977 to 26 May 1979 and served as a Member of the Parliament of Finland from 1972 to 1987, representing the Centre Party. He was the Governor of Kuopio Province from 1993 to 1997.
