= Neptune and Triton =

Sculpture by Gian Lorenzo Bernini

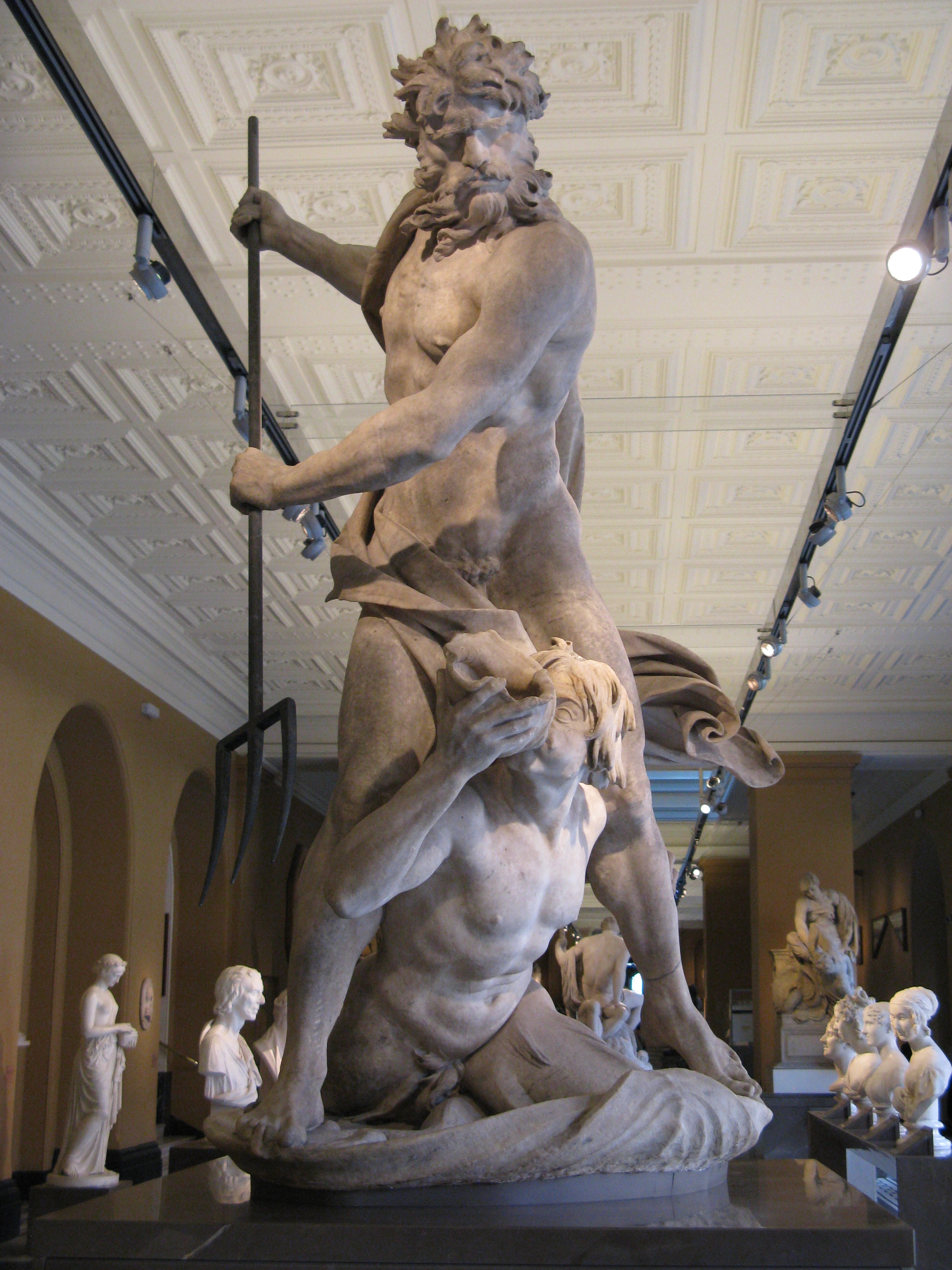
- Artist: Gian Lorenzo Bernini
- Year: 1622–23
- Catalogue: 9
- Type: Sculpture
- Medium: Marble
- Dimensions: 182 cm (72 in)
- Location: Europe 1600–1815 Galleries, Room 7, Victoria and Albert Museum, London; 51°29′48.56″N 0°10′18.9″W
- Preceded by: Aeneas, Anchises, and Ascanius
- Followed by: The Rape of Proserpina

Neptune and Triton is an early sculpture by the Italian artist Gian Lorenzo Bernini. It is housed in the Victoria and Albert Museum of London and was executed c. 1622–1623. Carved from marble, it stands 182.2 cm (71.7 in) in height.

== History ==
The marble sculpture group was originally commissioned by Cardinal Alessandro Damascenti-Peretti Montalto in 1620, and executed March 1622 to February 1623, serving as a fountain to decorate the pond in the garden of his Villa Peretti Montalto on the Viminal Hill in Rome. The group was placed in the pre-existing oval pool (called the Peschiera or Peschierone), designed by Domenico Fontana in 1579–81.

It was purchased by the Englishman Thomas Jenkins in 1786, from whom it was purchased later that year by the painter Joshua Reynolds. The work had been called "Neptune and Glaucus" following Filippo Baldinucci's biography of the artist, but appears as "Nettvno, e Tritone" in Domenico de' Rossi's engraving (1704), and also later corrected to "Neptune and Triton" following Reynolds' notes.

After Reynolds's death in 1792 it was sold to Charles Anderson-Pelham, 1st Baron Yarborough, who kept it in the garden of his home in Chelsea, London, Walpole House. His descendants moved it in 1906 to their country house, Brocklesby Hall, Lincolnshire. It was bought from the family by the Victoria and Albert Museum in 1950, although it had appeared at an exhibition at the Royal Academy in London in 1938.

== Literary reference ==
The scene is thought to be making loose allusions to Neptune and Triton aiding Trojan ships as described, by Virgil, or Ovid or both, together with additional material.

In Ovid's Metamorphoses, Neptune bids Triton to blow his shell to calm the waves, In Virgil's Aeneid, Neptune calms the waves and afterwards, the nereid Cymothoe and Triton dislodge Aeneas's ships, helped in the effort by Neptune using the trident. But neither passages precisely match and the artist must have patched together a version using other sources.

== Iconography ==
The composition of Bernini's Neptune and Triton consists of Neptune standing astride over Triton; Triton lies in sort of a "crouching" position; (Note: Actually more like rearing up its upper body (while grasping Neptune's thigh with one hand).) the two figures mounted on a large half-shell, which serves as socle.

Neptune aims his trident seawards, while Triton is blowing his conch. The conch was designed to spurt out gushing water, in order that the sculpture could serve as a fountain.

The posture of Neptune's stance, the filling-in of the reverse-V-shaped negative space by another figure (of Triton), were "radical" departures from for Bernini, as it was his "first work in which the silhouette (i.e. block-shape) is broken", and his achievement of "full Baroque freedom", in the words of Rudolf Wittkower. However, Wittkower also qualified that Bernini was yet to attain the dynamism ("the great sweeping movement which animates both David and Pluto [and Daphne] ") in his subsequent works.

=== Neptune ===
Neptune is represented as a "mature bearded", muscular figure of male authority, twisting his torso as he is about to thrust his trident in downward motion towards water. Neptune sports a cloak, but is otherwise naked. His "touseled hair and beard", suggests the storminess in this scene.

Wittkower who subscribed to the view this was a reenactment of Virgil, was satisfied that this gesture was Neptune, with an "angry look towards the water", calming the waves with his trident. John Pope-Hennessy pointed out the defect that Bernini did not include the nereid if he was reenacting Virgil's passage, and suggested a quote from Ovid as basis; it was then counter-argued that this Ovid passage too was defective in failing to mention the trident explicitly. Collier pointed out it was peculiar that Neptune should wear a wrathful expression calming the sea, and suggested a different passage from Ovid where Neptune was in wrath, but this too was flawed as it did not mention Trident.

Collier also remarked that if Virgil was the source, Neptune might not have been waving the trident at the sea, but rather using the instrument to dislodge the ships from the rocks, as stated in the poem. But since Bernini's work failed to hint at any presence of ships, this proposition seemed untenable to him.

As a side-note, it has also been noticed that ends of Neptune's drapery are made to look like a dolphin's head. It has been suggested this pays homage to the classical writing by Ovid, at a different passage that mentions the Neptune and dolphins (but not Triton), as well as to the general Ovidian theme of transformations in the Metamorphosis and other works. Barrow on the other hand perceived light-heartedness in the artistic touch here, which was "evocative of the spirit of Hellenistic Rococo".

=== Triton ===
Triton, Neptune's son, is positioned below Neptune's legs, thrusting himself forward to blow the conch shell. He is noticeably younger, maybe a teenage boy, though also with defined musculature. He blows his shell as a horn to announce that the king of the earth and oceans is approaching. Triton grasps Neptune's leg and ducks his left shoulder between the thighs of Neptune.

Bernini's Triton is double-tailed, simulating the two-legged human, both in this sculpture group and in his later work, the Triton Fountain in Rome.

== Naturalism ==
The naturalism of the figures suggests the artist's intention to elicit an immediate emotional response to the viewer. Neptune's furrowed brow gives a sense of his fierce strength. His stance is set in stone, solidifying his divine power. In contrast, Triton looks somewhat submissive while he is grabbing Neptune's thigh. His face looks to be full of anxiety as if he knows that he should obey whatever Neptune commands him to do. His timid nature and Neptune's dominate presence display the reality of human emotion and brings back the point of Bernini's plan to convey myths coming to life.

Bernini gave the audience the chance to "see" these gods in person; in movement. This was Bernini's first sculpture to " …work where the silhouette is broken, where the climax of a transitory action is given and where the action extends beyond the physical limits". The point of the sculpture is to bring the viewer to face a myth or story to be true and real by its dramatic tension in the body positions and subtle hints at natural life. He was making the myths, rumours and stories an opportunity to be true and demand its viewer to believe in its truth.

== Gallery ==
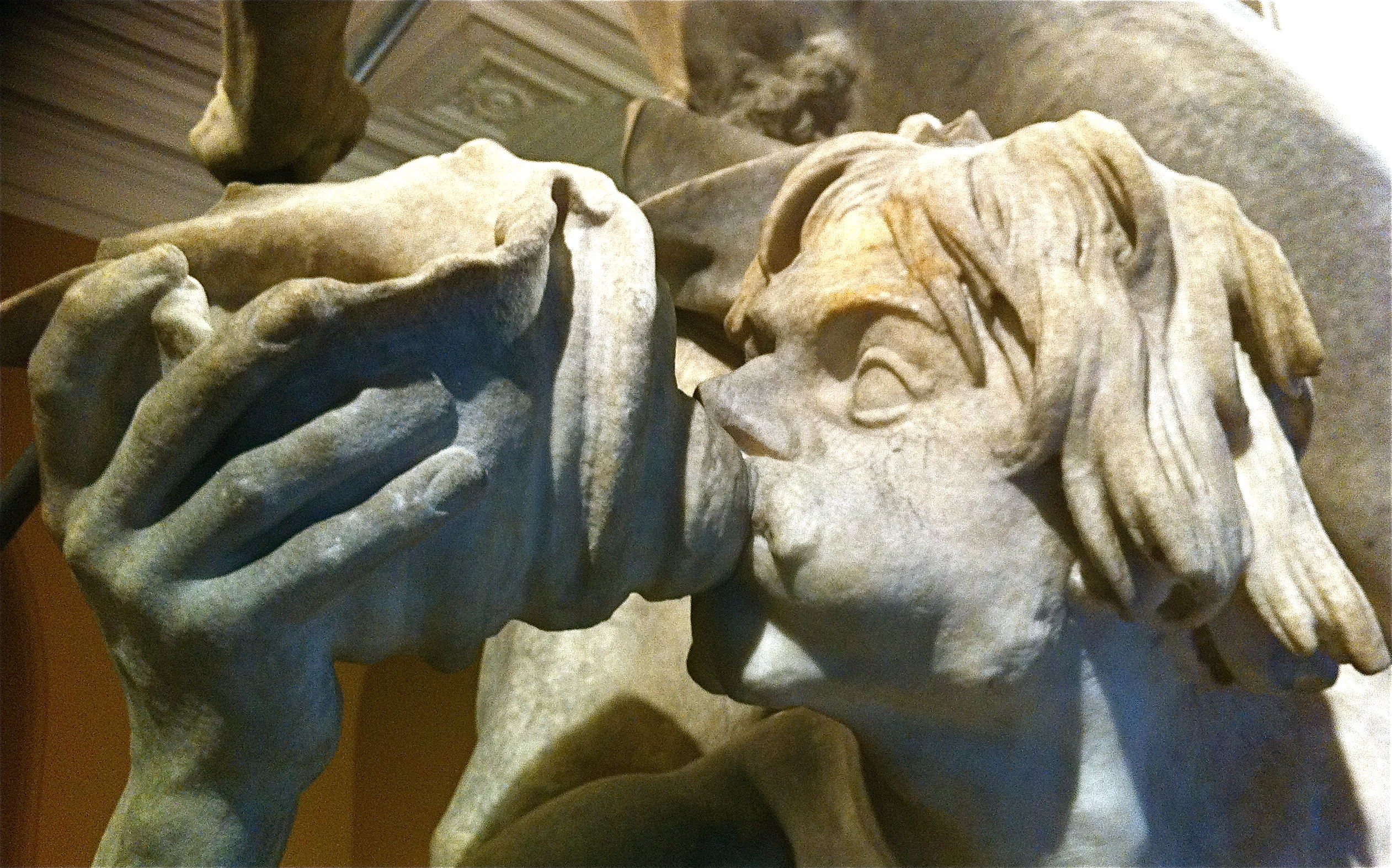
Detail of Triton

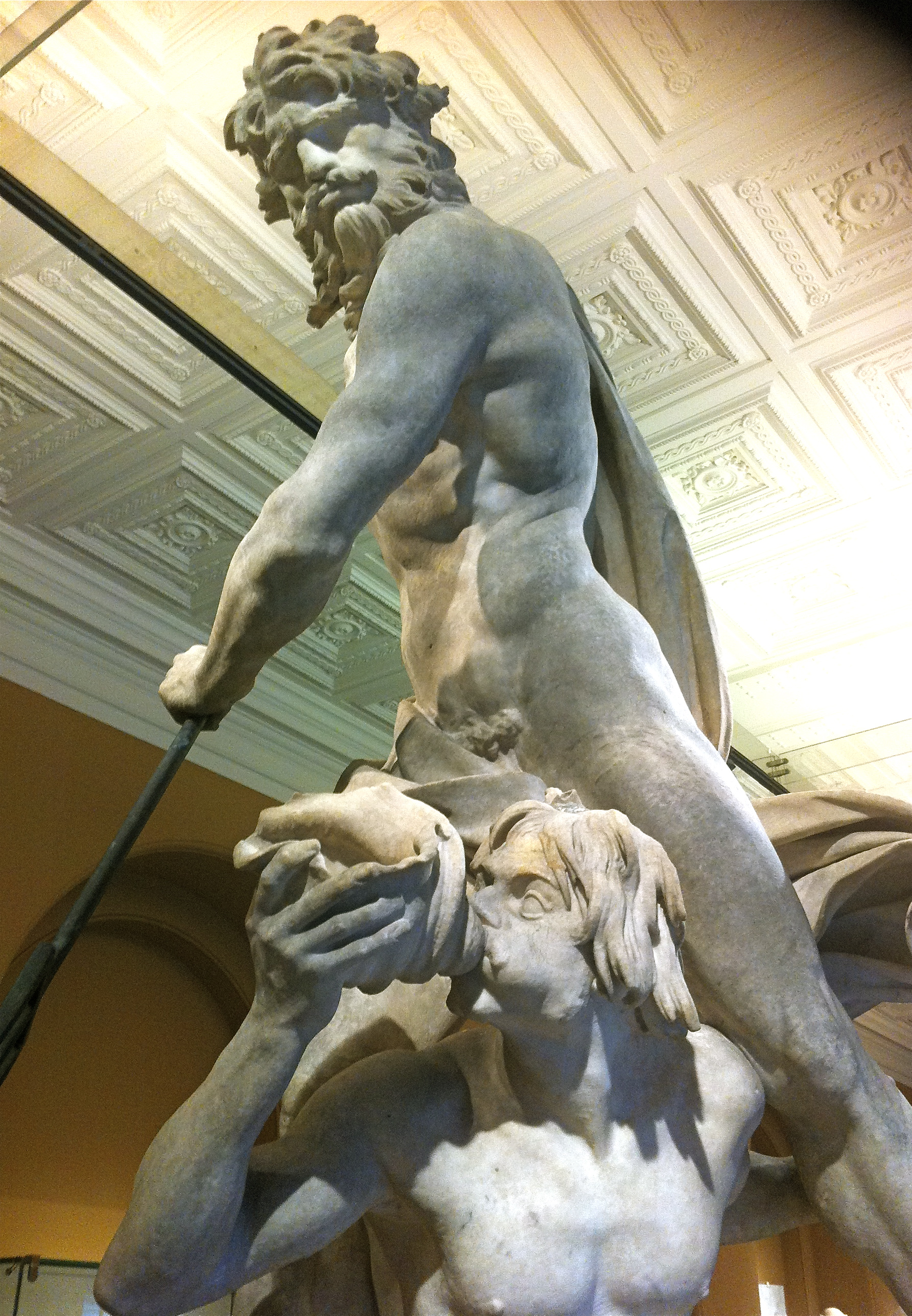
(front view)

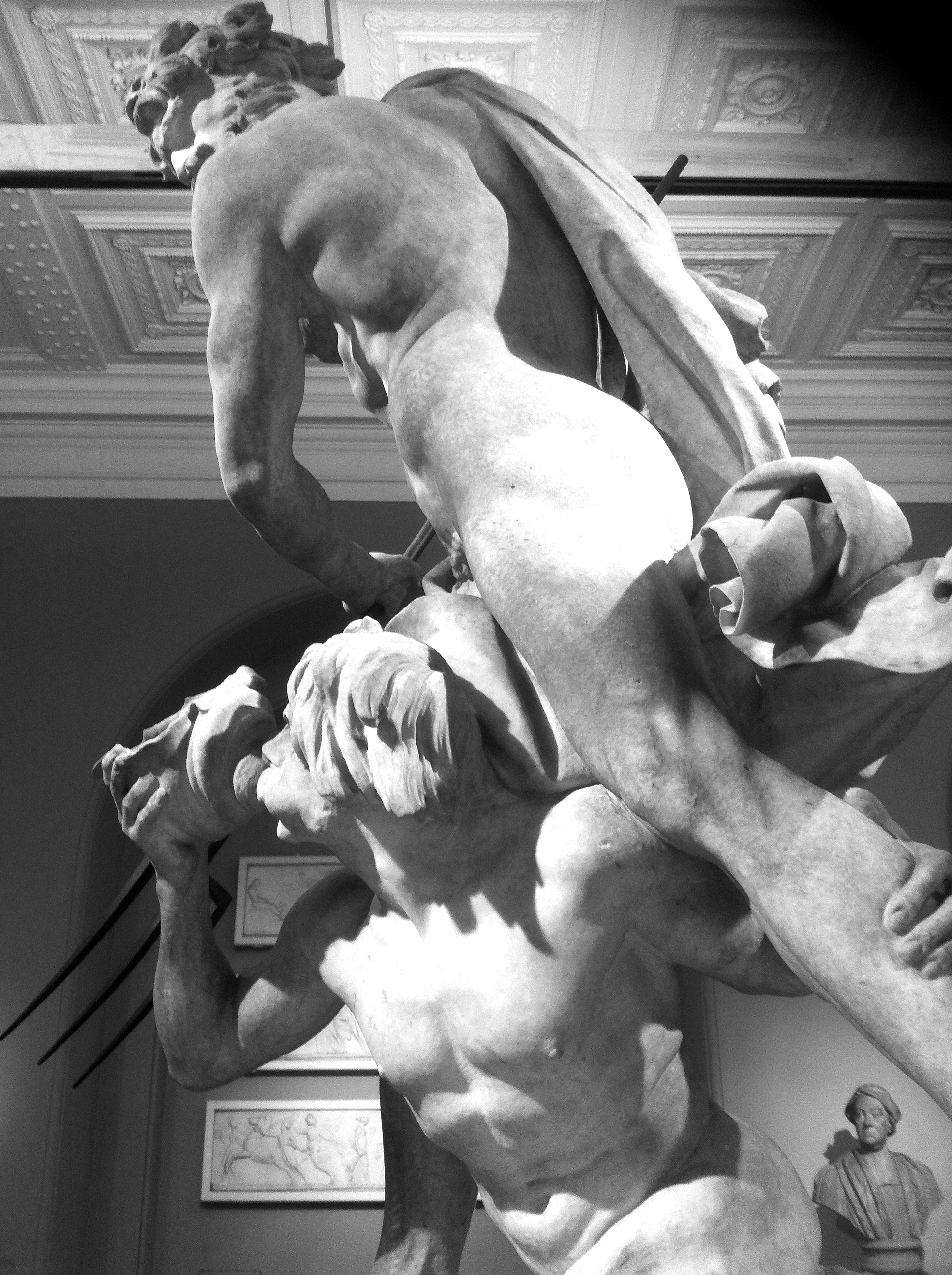
(side view)

== See also ==
- List of works by Gian Lorenzo Bernini
