= Palazzo di Spagna =

Coordinates: 41°54′17.98″N 12°28′57.46″E

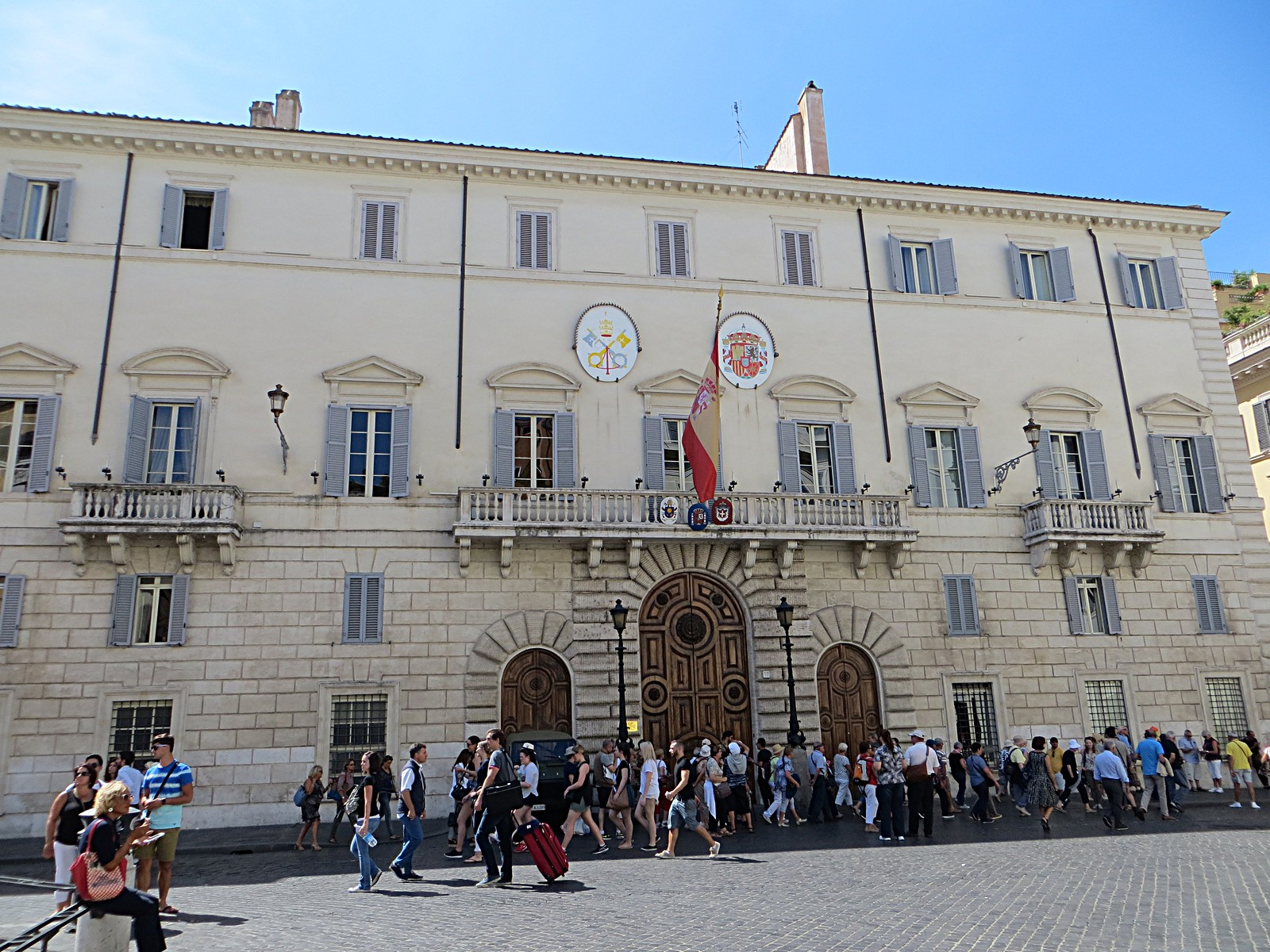

General information
- Architectural style: Baroque
- Location: Rome, Italy

The Palazzo di Spagna (Palace of Spain); also known as the Monaldeschi Palace, is a historic Italian Baroque-style palace in the Piazza di Spagna (Spanish Square) that was previously owned by the Monaldeschi family. It has housed the Embassy of Spain to the Holy See since 1647, and is owned by the Spanish state.

== Origins of the Embassy ==
The Embassy of Spain to the Holy See is the oldest permanent diplomatic mission in the world. It was created in 1480 by King Ferdinand the Catholic. Its first ambassador was Gonzalo de Beteta, a knight of the Order of Santiago. It has hosted multiple Iberian legations to Italian states: from 1647 to 1707, it housed the Embassies of Castile, Aragon, and Navarre to the Papal States; from 1707 to 1841, the Embassies of Spain and Navarre to the Papal States; from 1841 to 1870, the Embassy of Spain to the Papal States; from 1870 to 1929, the Embassy of Spain to Italy; and between 1929 and 1947, the Embassy of Spain to both Italy and the Vatican.

The bilateral embassy to Italy was relocated to the Palazzo Borghese, on the first floor of the western wing that faces Via di Ripetta. It was once again relocated in 2026, at the newly-renovated Palazzo di San Giacomo degli Spagnoli, at Piazza Navona.

== History and Description ==
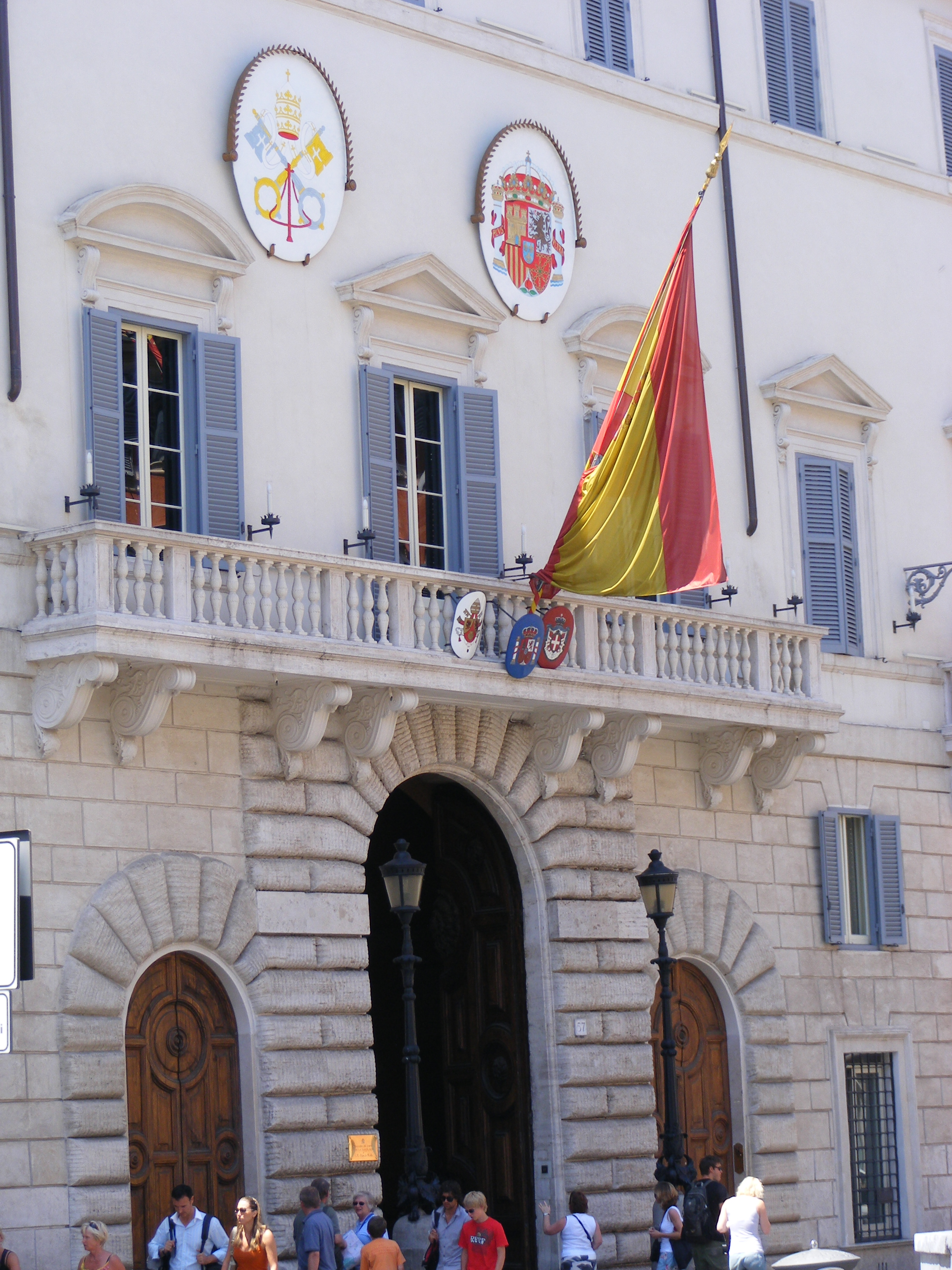
The main entrance

In 1622, the Spanish ambassador to Rome, Íñigo Vélez de Guevara y Tassis, Count of Oñate, rented a smaller version of what became the Monaldeschi Palace from the Monaldeschi family in the former “Piazza della Trinità”. In 1647, the new ambassador, Íñigo Vélez de Guevara, 8th Count of Oñate, bought the property for 22,000 Roman scudi and immediately transferred it to the Count of Oñate. Over time, nextdoor properties were bought and the building expanded.

In 1654, the palace was acquired by the Spanish crown as a permanent residence for ambassadors. King Philip IV sent 19,000 ducats for maintenance and repair.

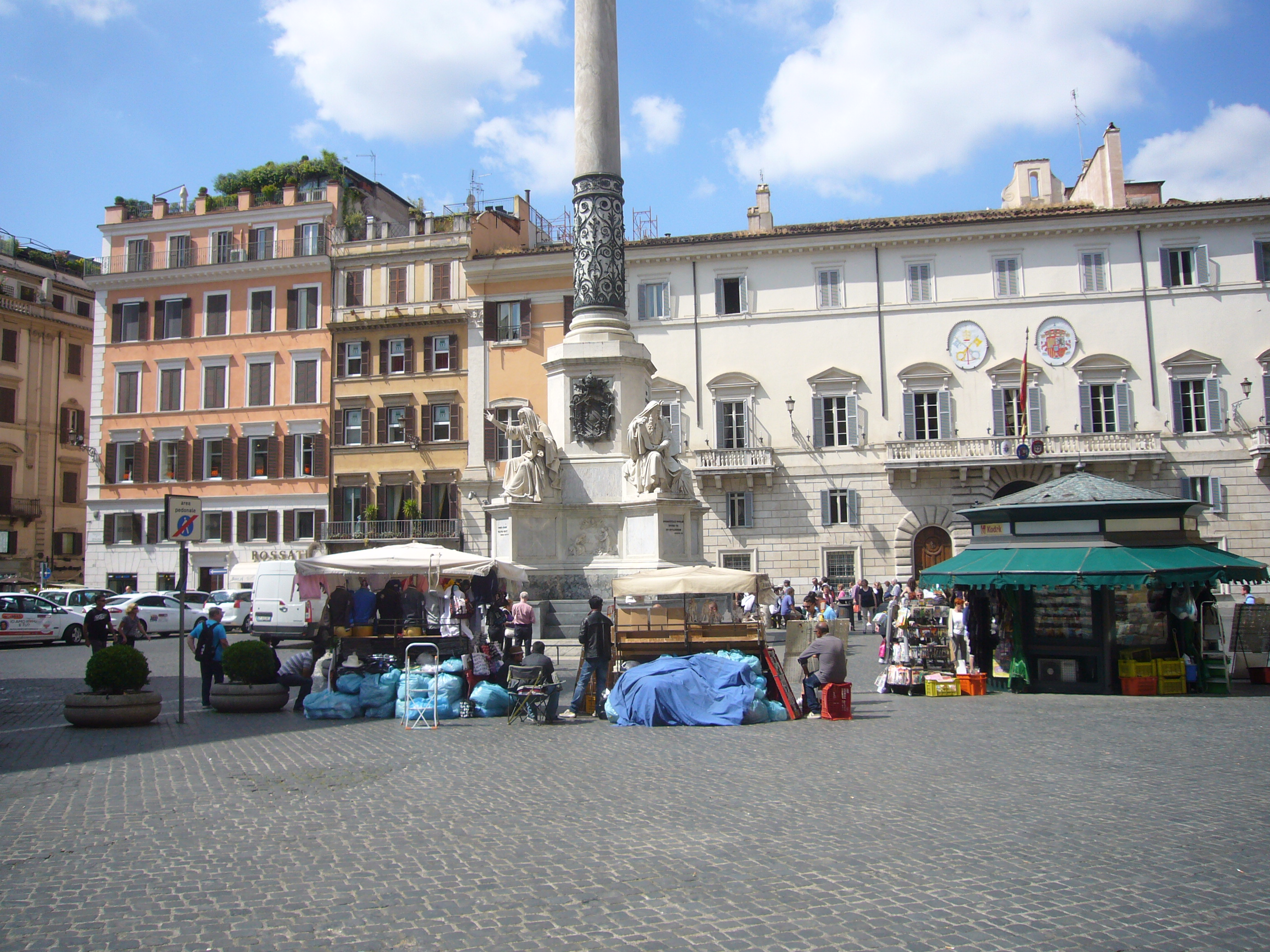
View from the piazza

Between 1685 and 1693, Francesco Borromini designed palace extensions and modifications affecting the façade, the interior, the entrance gallery, the main hall ceiling, the courtyard, and the large square staircase. The architect Antonio Del Grande (1625–1671) continued with the works.

During the 18th century, the rooms were redecorated and Neoclassical and Pompeian decorations were introduced, including a small private theater in which the where Vittorio Alfieri premiered his Antigone on November 20, 1782.

The embassy houses a collection of 17th-century Gobelin tapestries that belonged to the Bourbon-Orleans family originally from the Galliera Palace in Bologna, with Roman and biblical themes. The walls of the formal dining room are adorned with three splendid 18th-century wool and silk tapestries from the Royal Palace of Madrid, depicting scenes from the life of Telemachus, according to designs drawn by Peter Paul Rubens.

The halls feature paintings of the Prado Museum of renowned artists such as Federico Madrazo, Vicente López, Nattier, Mengs, Mario Nuzzi. Among the sculptures are two busts by Gianlorenzo Bernini from 1619, El alma beata and El alma condenada(The Blessed Soul and The Damned Soul).

On September 8, 1857, Pope Pius IX inaugurated the Column of the Immaculate Conception that stands in the Piazza di Spagna in remembrance of the definition of the dogma of the Immaculate Conception—a cause Spain had staunchly defended for centuries.

== Bibliography ==
- Alía, Manuel Espada Burgos; fotografía e investigación iconográfica, Juan Carlos García (2006). Buscando a España en Roma. Barcelona: Lunwerg Editores. ISBN 8497853512.
- Tomàs, Thomas J. Dandelet; traducción castellana de Lara Vilà (2002). La Roma española (1500-1700). Barcelona: Crítica. ISBN 8484323900.
