= Aeneas, Anchises, and Ascanius =

Sculpture by Gian Lorenzo Bernini

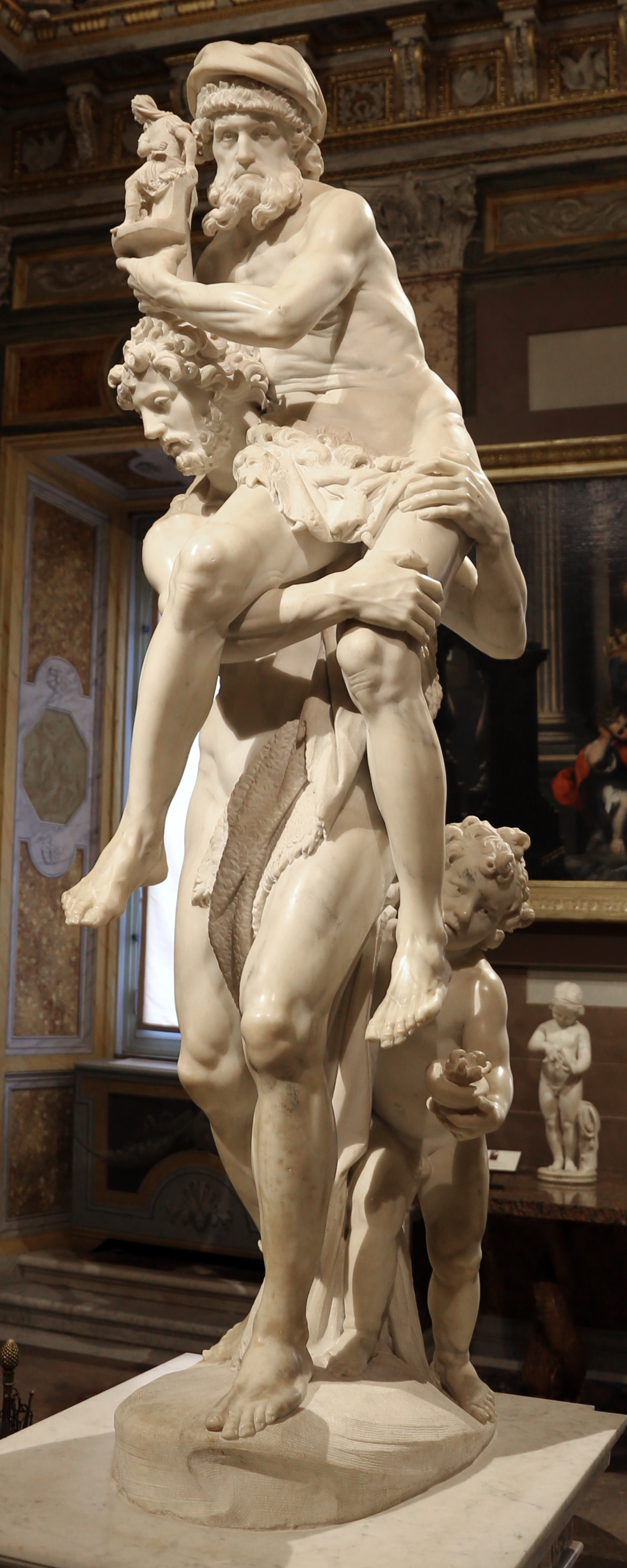
- Artist: Gian Lorenzo Bernini
- Year: 1618-19
- Catalogue: 8
- Type: Sculpture
- Medium: Marble
- Dimensions: 220 cm (87 in)
- Location: Galleria Borghese; Rome; 41°54′50.4″N 12°29′31.2″E
- Preceded by: Blessed Soul (Bernini)
- Followed by: Neptune and Triton

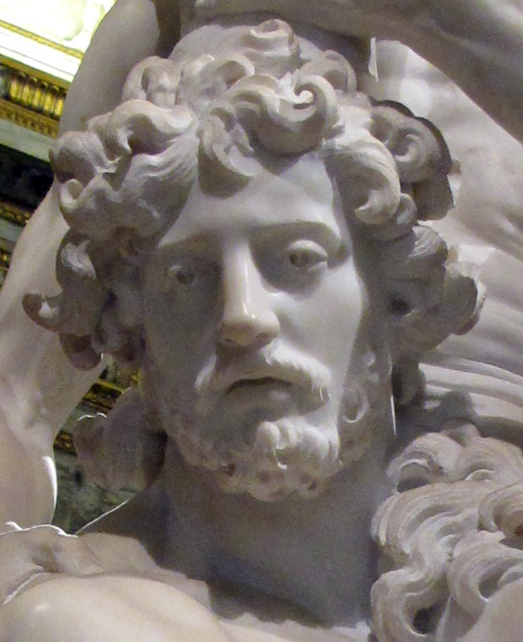
Detail

Aeneas, Anchises, and Ascanius is a sculpture by the Italian artist Gian Lorenzo Bernini created c. 1618–19. Housed in the Galleria Borghese in Rome, the sculpture depicts a scene from the Aeneid, where the hero Aeneas leads his family from burning Troy.

The life-sized group shows three generations of Aeneas' family. The young man is Aeneas, who carries an older man—his father, Anchises—on his shoulder. He gazes down to the side with a strong determination. Aeneas' lineage from the gods—his mother is Venus—is emphasized through the lion skin draped around his body (a lion skin commonly stands for power, and is often related to Hercules, a descendant of Zeus). Behind Aeneas follows his young son, Ascanius.

The statue was made by Bernini when he was twenty years old, although it is often thought that he had help from his father, Pietro Bernini [2]. Through his father, the younger Bernini was gaining renown in the higher circles of Rome; Pietro's famous Mannerist sculptures were commissioned even by the Pope. Through some minor commissions for Pope Paul V, Gianlorenzo began to be recognized as a very promising sculptor. The Pope couldn't believe that one so young could carve such work. Those sculptures, especially the antique ones, eventually caught the attention of Cardinal Scipione Borghese, who loved arts, money and male physical beauty, and who was the most powerful man in Rome after the Pope. [6]

The sculpture is influenced by earlier works of other artists. Michelangelo's figure of the Risen Christ (in Santa Maria sopra Minerva) is held to have served as an example for the figure of Aeneas. The head of Aeneas appears to reflect Pietro Bernini's John the Baptist (Cappella Barberini in Sant'Andrea della Valle). It is thought that it has also elements derived from Raphael's fresco The Fire in the Borgo (Vatican Museum, Stanze di Borgo) and from Federico Barocci's own painted interpretation of the Flight of Aeneas (Villa Borghese)[2]. Also, the stance of the sculpture echoes another work that his father created, the Saint Matthew with Angel. Aeneas' left foot and Ascanius' right foot are standing forward, whereas in Pietro's sculpture of Saint Matthew the stance is the same, but mirrored[2].

== Patronage ==
This was the Bernini's first commission from Cardinal Scipione Borghese. It probably started around 1618 and finished the succeeding year. It was one of a number of sculptures that would end up in the Villa Borghese, now the Galleria Borghese.

== Story ==
Bernini's inspiration for the work was the Aeneid, the Latin epic poem which tells the story of Aeneas, a Trojan who left his home city and eventually ended up in Italy, where he became a progenitor of the Roman people. The precise scene depicted is the moment when Aeneas carries his father, the elderly Anchises, and his son Ascanius from Troy, after it has been sacked by the Greek army. In his hand, Anchises carries a vessel with his ancestors' ashes, on the top of which are two tiny statues of Di Penates, Roman household gods.

== Artistic influences ==
Bernini has only just passed twenty when the work was completed. Therefore, it is not unusual to see that the style of execution still owed much to other artists - his own style would become more apparent with the other pieces commissioned by Cardinal Scipione Borghese. The influence of his father Pietro Bernini was evident in the rather lumpy handling of the figures. Elements of the sixteenth-century sculptor Giambologna occur, particular in how Bernini attempted to construct a sense of movement upwards from the boy Ascansius to his grandfather Anchises. The figure of Aeneas may be modelled on Michelangelo's sculpture of Risen Christ.

Two painted influences are also cited. Firstly, the painting by Federico Barocci of the same topic, which was also in Cardinal Borghese's collection. But the more famous influence is from Raphael's fresco in the Vatican, The Fire in the Borgo, which depicts a similar scene, showing a man carrying his father with his son beside them.

== Critical reception ==
The sculpture was for a considerable time considered to be by Bernini's father Pietro. Even when later evidence revealed the statue was by Gian Lorenzo Bernini, critical reception of the sculpture was mixed. Hibbard recognised the artistry in the contrast between Aeneas' firm skin and the sagging skin of the older Anchises, but also noted the statue as "cramped and tentative". Others have seen in the sculpture, as with the other sculptures for Cardinal Borghese, the evolution from earlier Mannerist sculptures. Ann Sutherland Harris contrasts Bernini's work with Giambologna's Rape of the Sabine Woman. Giambologna's pyramidical composition invited viewers to walk around it, seeing different character expressions and indeed the shape and texture of their bodies from different positions; Bernini's sculpture, on the other hand, allowed a single viewpoint from which to see the expressions of the three characters - with much less of the story being evident when looked at from different angles.

== See also ==
- List of works by Gian Lorenzo Bernini
