= Vuotjärvi =

Lake in the country of Finland

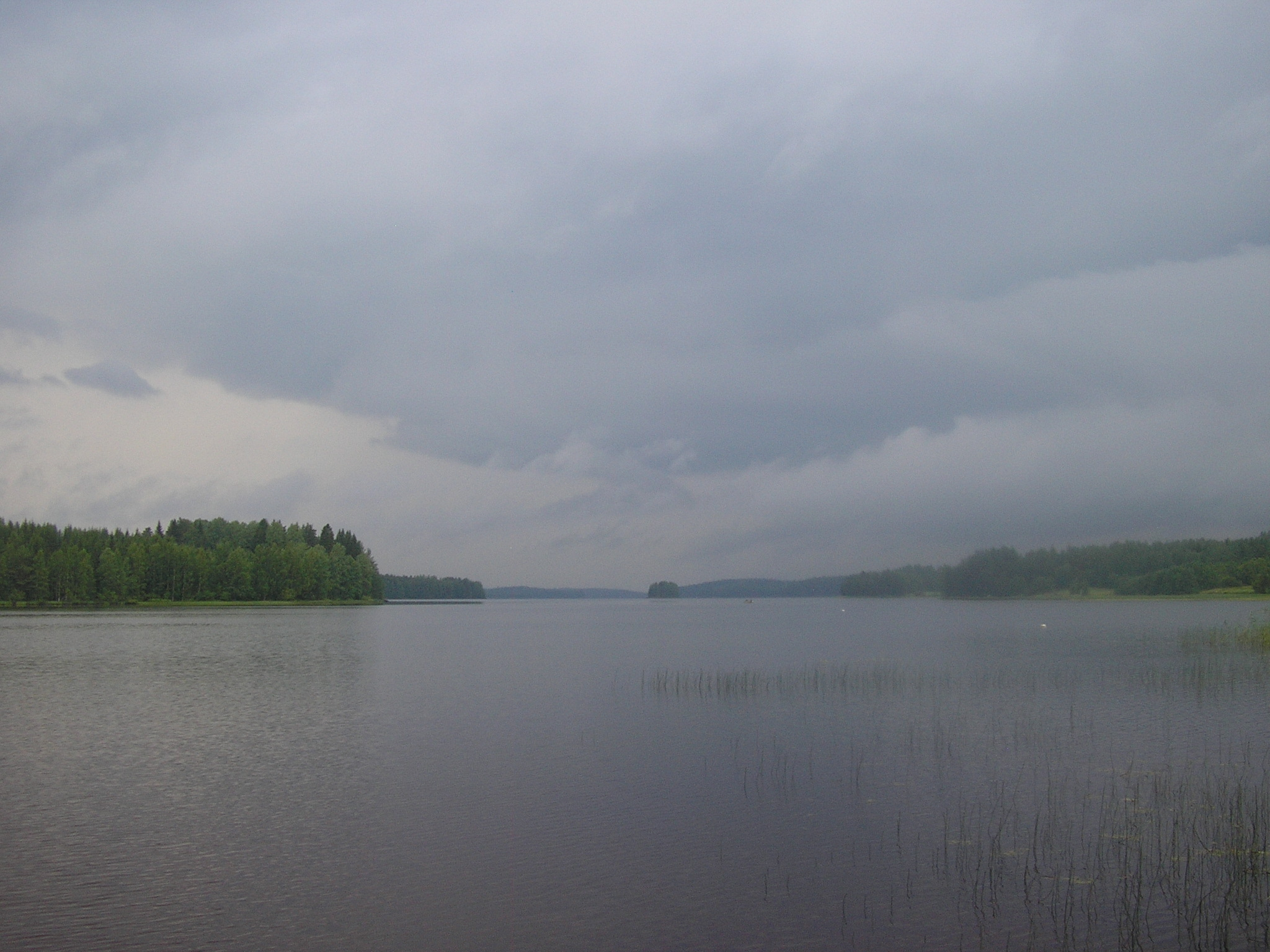

- Location within Finland
- Location: Kuopio
- Coordinates: 63°08′N 28°22′E
- Primary inflows: via Lastukoski rapids from the lake Syväri
- Primary outflows: via Juankoski power station to the lake Juurusvesi–Akonvesi
- Catchment area: Vuoksi
- Basin countries: Finland
- Surface area: 56.503 km^{2} (21.816 sq mi)
- Average depth: 4.87 m (16.0 ft)
- Max. depth: 32.45 m (106.5 ft)
- Water volume: 0.277 km^{3} (225,000 acre⋅ft)
- Shore length^{1}: 293.83 km (182.58 mi)
- Surface elevation: 95 m (312 ft)
- Frozen: December–April
- Islands: Iso-Karkeinen, Kuvajansaari
- Settlements: Juankoski
- ^{1} Shore length is not a well-defined measure.

Vuotjärvi is a medium-sized lake in Finland. It is located in the Northern Savonia region in Finland, in the municipality of Kuopio. The lake belongs to the Vuoksi main catchment area.

== See also ==
- List of lakes in Finland
