= Muuruvesi =

- Former municipality
- Muuruveden kunta Muuruvesi kommun
- Coat of arms

- Location of Muuruvesi in Finland
- Coordinates: 63.0153045°N 28.2085452°E
- Country: Finland
- Province: Kuopio Province
- Region: North Savo
- Established: 1899
- Merged into Juankoski: 1971
- Seat: Muuruveden kirkonkylä

Area
  - Land: 299.1 km^{2} (115.5 sq mi)

Population (1969-12-31)
  - Total: 3,708

Muuruvesi is a village and a former municipality of Finland. During its existence as a municipality, it was part of the Kuopio Province, and it now belongs to the region of North Savo. Together with Säyneinen, it was consolidated with Juankoski in 1971, since 2017 part of Kuopio.

== Geography ==
The municipality bordered Juankoski, Säyneinen, Nilsiä, Kaavi, Tuusniemi, Riistavesi and Siilinjärvi.

=== Villages ===
- Akonvesi
- Lohilahti
- Murtolahti
- Muuruveden kirkonkylä
- Niinimäki
- Pelonniemi
- Pieksä
- Rissala
- Ryönä
- Västinniemi
- Vehkasaari
- Vuotjärvi

== History ==
Muuruvesi has existed at least since the 1620s. At the time, it was a part of the Kuopio Parish. As Nilsiä became a chapel community under Kuopio in 1769, Muuruvesi became a part of it.

Nilsiä became a separate parish in 1816. A division of the Nilsiä Parish was ordered in 1899, splitting Muuruvesi and Varpaisjärvi from it, however Muuruvesi only became a functional parish in 1900 and started producing its own church registers in 1908. Juankoski was transferred from Nilsiä to Muuruvesi in 1907, remaining a part of it until Juankoski became a separate parish in 1923.

Together with Säyneinen, Muuruvesi was consolidated with the town of Juankoski in 1971. Juankoski was later consolidated with Kuopio in 2017.

== Church ==
The Muuruvesi church was designed by Josef Stenbäck. It was finished in 1904. Renovations were done in 1962, replacing the old wood heating with electric heating.
