= Säyneinen =

- Former municipality
- Säyneisen kunta Säyneis kommun
- Coat of arms

- Location of Säyneinen in Finland
- Coordinates: 63.2053221°N 28.4799407°E
- Country: Finland
- Province: Kuopio Province
- Region: North Savo
- Established: 1924
- Merged into Juankoski: 1971
- Seat: Säyneisen kirkonkylä

Area
  - Land: 186.2 km^{2} (71.9 sq mi)

Population (1969-12-31)
  - Total: 2,251

Säyneinen is a village and a former municipality in the present-day North Savo region of Finland. During its existence as an independent municipality, it belonged to the Kuopio Province. Together with Muuruvesi, it was consolidated with Juankoski in 1971. Juankoski, in turn, was consolidated with Kuopio in 2017.

== Geography ==
The municipality bordered Juankoski, Muuruvesi, Rautavaara, Juuka, Kaavi and Nilsiä.

The village of Säyneinen is located between two lakes called Suuri-Säyneinen and Pieni-Säyneinen.

== Name ==
The name of Säyneinen comes from the word säyne, referring to the ide, a fairly common fish in Finland. Another municipality named after this fish was Säynätsalo (via the local word säynät) in Central Finland.

Unlike the names of most municipalities ending in -(i)nen, the declension of Säyneinen is in the singular: Säyneisen, Säyneisessä and not in the plural (*Säyneisten, *Säyneisissä). This is shared with the name of Kaustinen. A person from Säyneinen is called säyneisläinen or säyneeläinen.

== History ==
The territories of Säyneinen and Muuruvesi were mostly transferred to Juankoski in 1971.

Säyneinen is located in historical Karelia. Like the modern region of North Karelia, the area was initially part of the Novgorod Republic, passing to Muscovy with the rest of Novgorod in 1478 and remaining under Russian rule until the Swedish conquest of the area finalized by the Treaty of Stolbovo in 1617.

Säyneinen itself was first mentioned in 1638 as Säynäis. It was a part of the Liperi parish and since 1670, the chapel community of Kaavi. Kaavi became a separate parish in 1802 and a separate municipality in 1875. Säyneinen was separated from Kaavi as a parish in 1917 and as a municipality in 1924. The municipality was consolidated with Juankoski in 1971, but the parish remained separate until 2003.

Säyneinen became a part of Kuopio after Juankoski was consolidated with it in 2017.

== Church ==
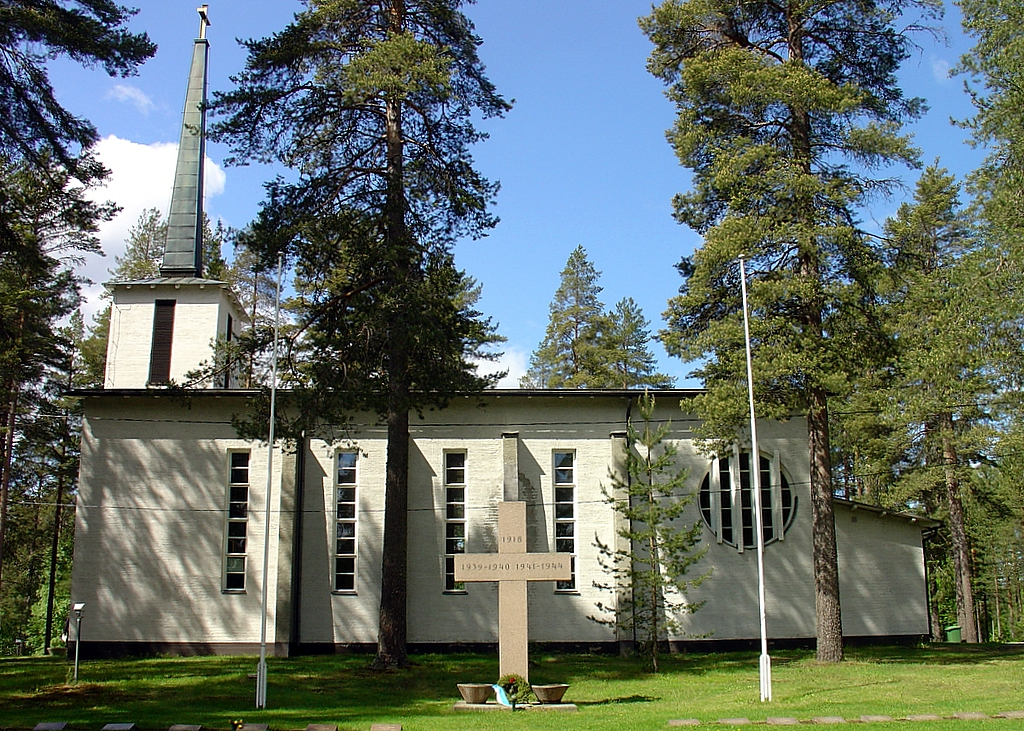

The current church of Säyneinen was designed by Sakari Honkavaara and Esko Suhonen. The church was finished in 1939 and it is an example of functionalist architecture. There is a cross in the place of the altarpiece, however the restored altarpiece was placed in the church hall in 2002.

== Services ==
=== School ===
Säyneinen had a school for grades 1-6 (ala-aste) until 2015. After it was acquired by the town of Kuopio in 2017, the town's government was attempting to sell the school to a private owner. As nobody was willing to buy the school, the municipal government of Kuopio decided to demolish it in 2020.
