= Kallavesi =

Lake in the country of Finland

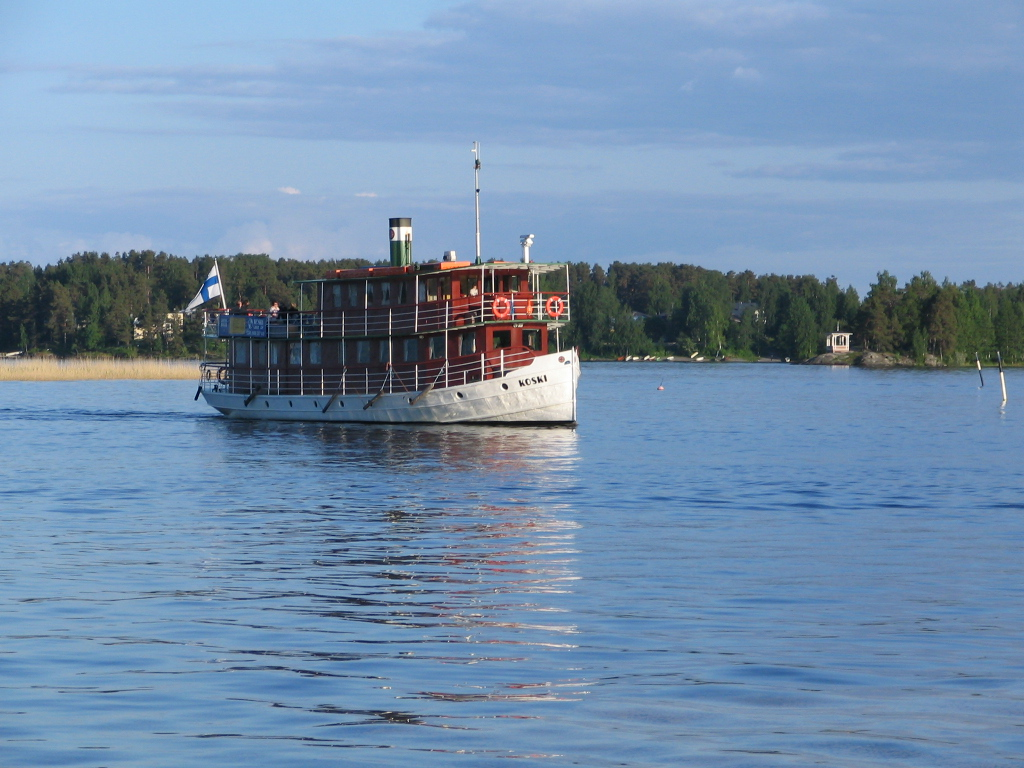
- Koski ship on Kallavesi.

- Location within Finland

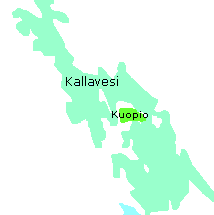
- Location: Northern Savonia
- Coordinates: 62°49′N 027°47′E
- Catchment area: 16,270 km^{2} (6,280 sq mi)
- Basin countries: Finland
- Max. length: 90 km (56 mi)
- Max. width: 15 km (9 mi)
- Surface area: 472.76 km^{2} (182.53 sq mi)
- Average depth: 5–10 m (16–33 ft)
- Max. depth: > 60 m (200 ft)
- Surface elevation: 81.8 m (268 ft)
- Settlements: Kuopio, Vehmersalmi

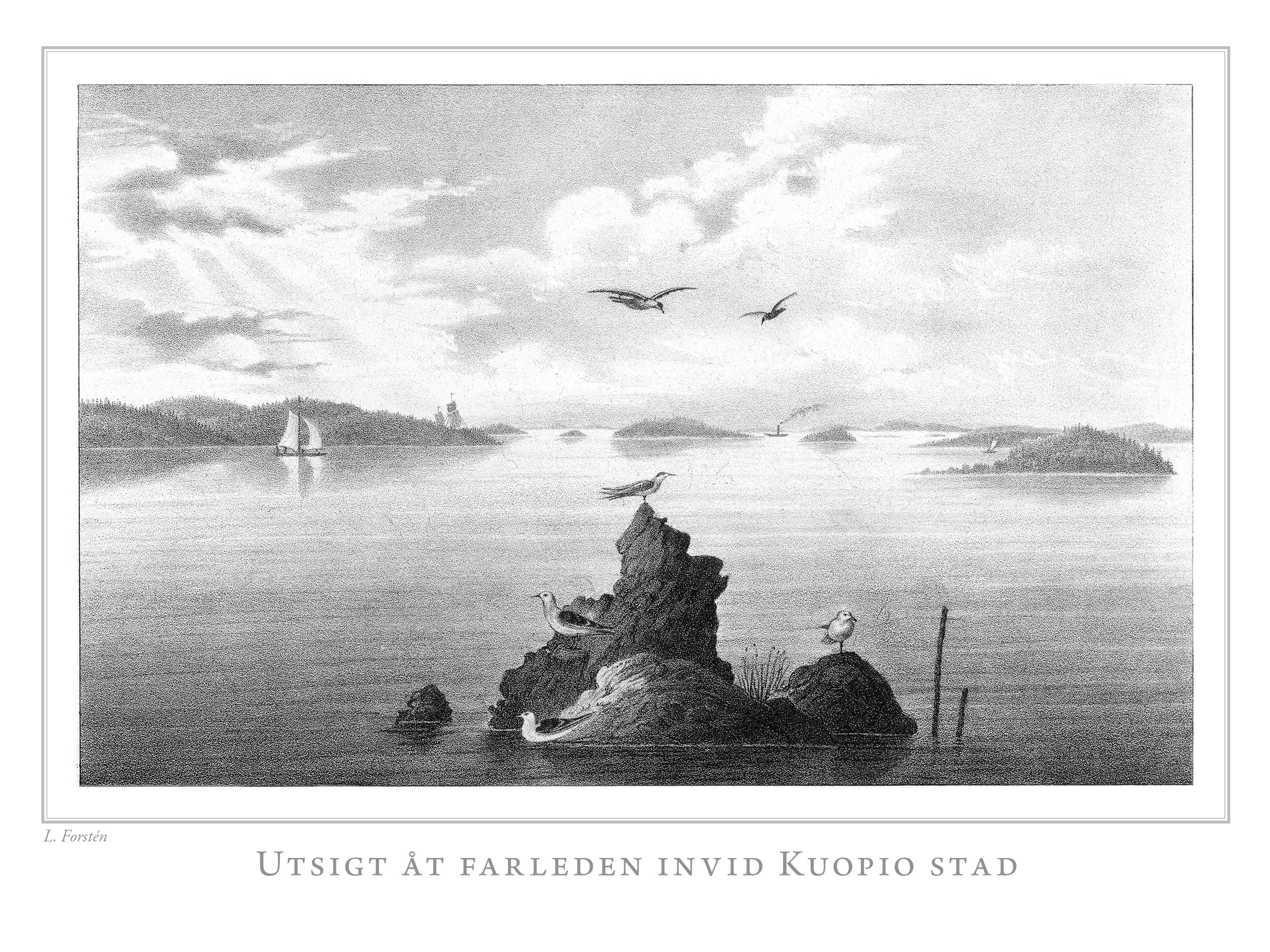
Illustration in Finland framstäldt i teckningar edited by Zacharias Topelius and published 1845-1852.

Kallavesi is a medium-sized lake in Northern Savonia, eastern Finland located around the town of Kuopio. Combined with the lakes Suvasvesi, Juurusvesi–Akonvesi, Muuruvesi, Melavesi, and Riistavesi Kallavesi forms an 890 square kilometres (340 sq mi) lake system named Iso-Kalla. Kallavesi is the largest lake in the region and the tenth largest lake in the country. Some of its islands include Laivonsaari and Karhonsaari.

== See also ==
- Finnish Lakeland
- Port of Kuopio
