= Jaakko Kolmonen =

Finnish chef (1941–2016)

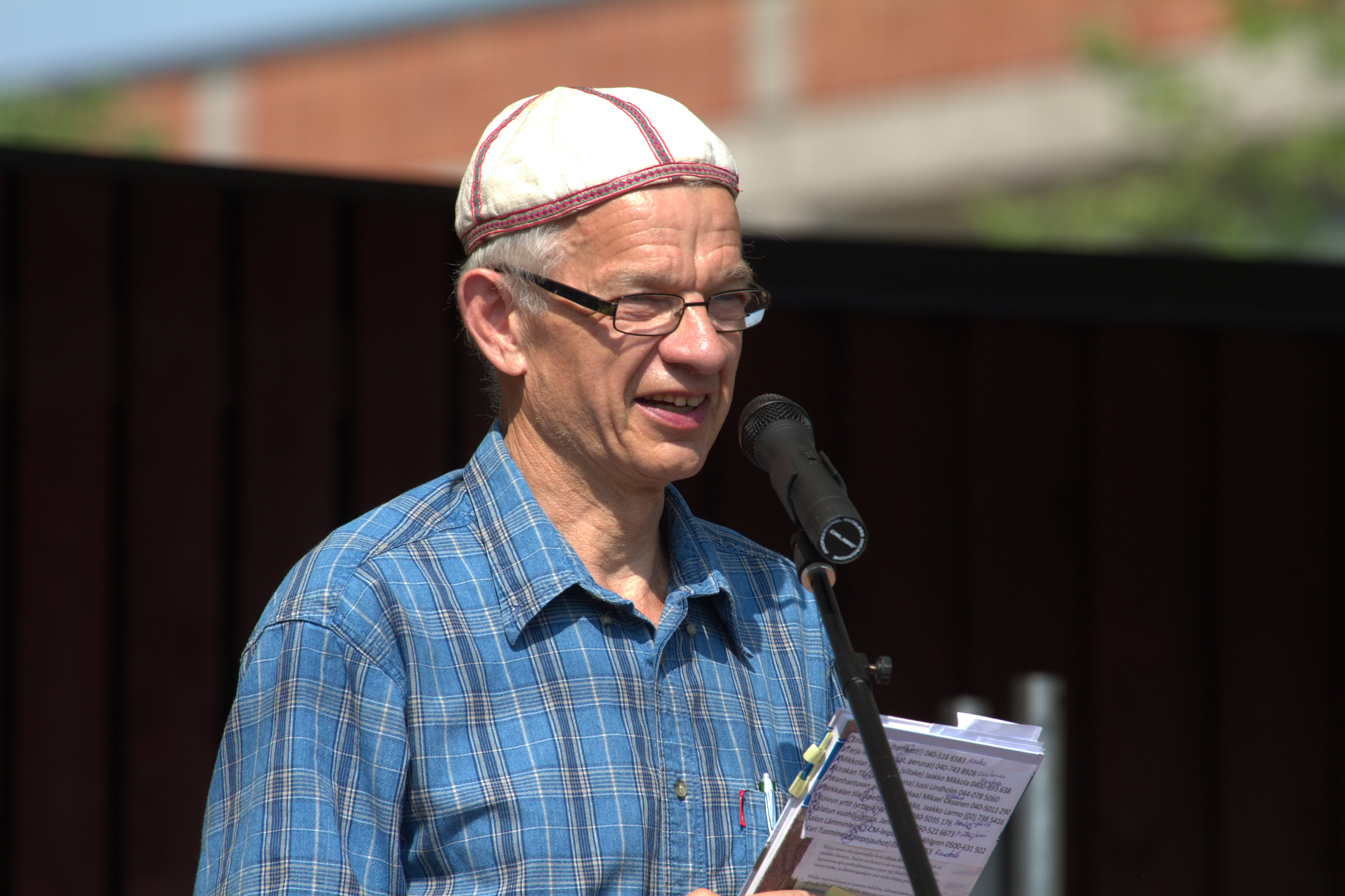
- Kolmonen in 2010
- Born: 2 May 1941; Juankoski, Finland
- Died: 3 September 2016 (aged 75); Helsinki, Finland
- Occupation: Chef
- Awards: Finnish Lion's Order of Merit (1991)

Jaakko Kolmonen (May 2, 1941 – September 3, 2016) was a Finnish chef. He worked since 1962 as a cooking teacher in several vocational schools and was known for his many television cooking-themed programs on YLE TV2 such as Asia on pihvi (aired 1971–1973) and Patakakkonen (first aired in 1977).

In 1991, he was awarded the Finnish Lion's Order of Merit and the State Award for Public Information (in Finnish tiedonjulkistamispalkinto) in 1988. Jaakko Kolmonen was also active in the Finnish Chef Association.

== Books ==
- Kotomaamme ruoka-aitta: Suomen, Karjalan ja Petsamon pitäjäruoat
- Kokin niksikirja
- Mitä minä syön
