= Museum Masuuni Brunou =

Museum in Finland

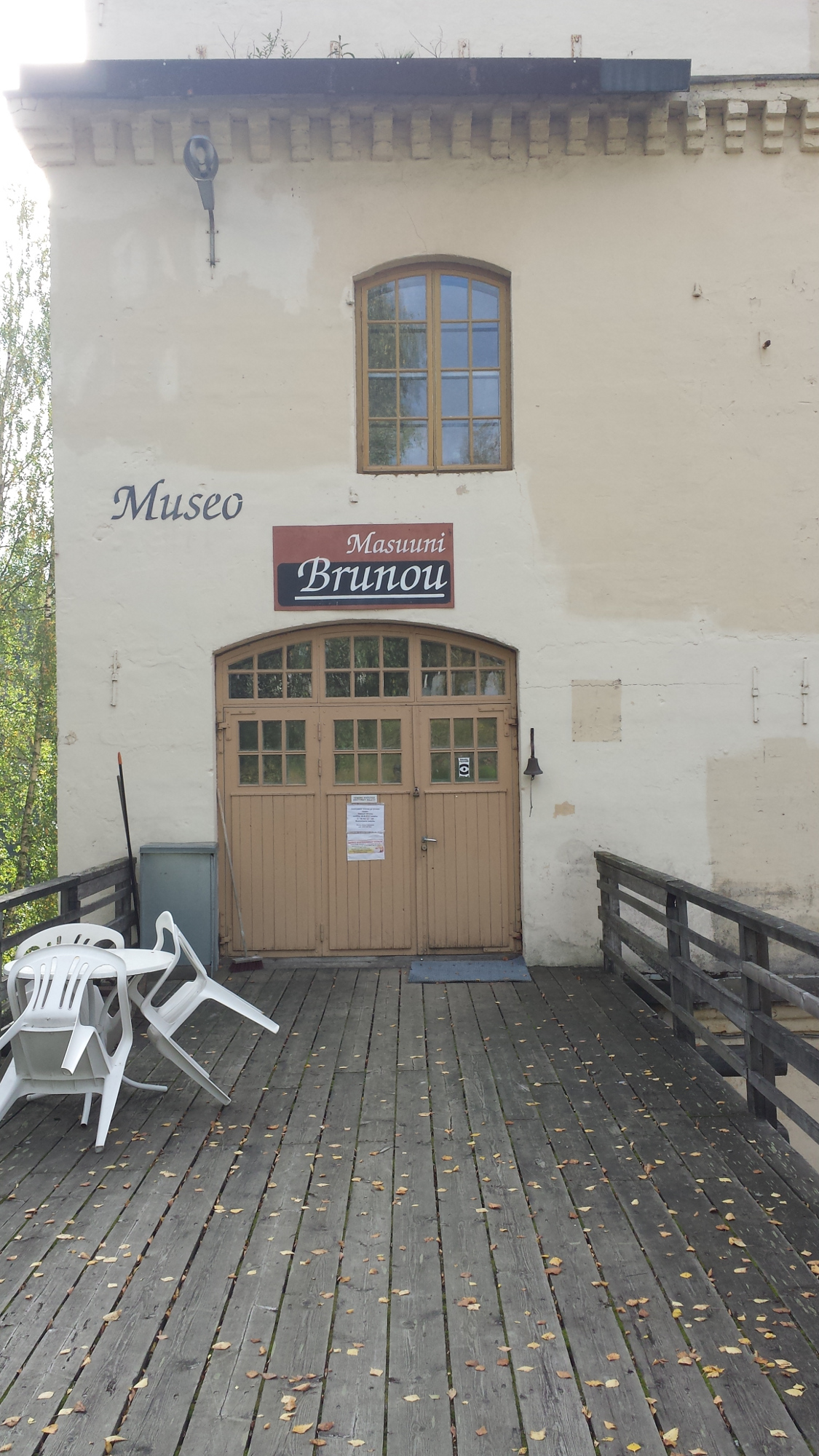
Masuuni Brunou

Museum Masuuni Brunou is a museum about the industrial history of Juankoski, Finland. The museum is situated in the old blast furnace building right beside the rapids (now dammed and diverted to produce hydro electricity) and is in the centre of the old foundry milieu.

The Juankoski Heritage Society was founded in 1990 to safeguard the cultural and historical heritage of the area. The Museum was opened by the society in 1991 and has displays relating to products of the foundry, local history and the lives of local inhabitants.

The museum's name 'Blast furnace Brunou' comes from building's original use and from the name of one of the founders of the foundry, Brynolf Brunou.

The main entry hall contains displays about the development from peasant to iron worker as well as the development of the factory from an ironworks to a cardboard mill. The second floor contains products from the foundry.

In other floors there is changing displays with different themes. The museum contains mainly products of the ironworks from the 1900s.

The museum is open in the summer from June to August.

== History ==
In 1746, commissioner Brynolf Brunou received permission from the authorities in Stockholm to create a foundry in the shore of Juckaisjoki river near Kuopio. The foundry specialized in using lake and swamp ore. For the first hundred years the pastoral family Argillander and the noble family Tigerstedt tried to get Strömsdalsbruk to operate profitably. However, it wasn't until the Russian Ponomarev family took over in the late 1800s that the factory became truly profitable and developed into one of the best maintained industrial centres in Finland.

In the early 1900s, the foundry was purchased by Baron Anton von Alftan. During this period iron smelting was discontinued with a groundwood plant being built on the opposite side of the river, followed a few years later by the beginning of cardboard production. This production was continued by Kymi concern in 1915. In the 1970s, Juantehdas developed as a cardboard factory which was bought by Stromsdal Oy in 1988. Following the bankruptcy of Stromsdal in 2008 the factory has since been purchased by Premium Board Finland in 2011.
