= Blessed Soul =

Bust by Gian Lorenzo Bernini

- Anima Beata (Latin)
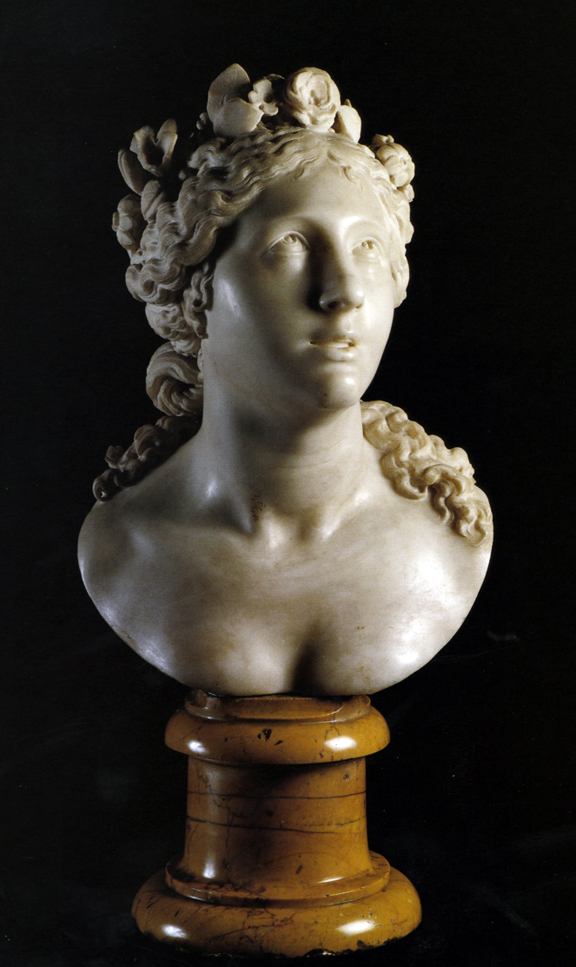
- Artist: Gian Lorenzo Bernini
- Year: 1619
- Catalogue: 7
- Type: Sculpture
- Medium: Marble
- Dimensions: Life-size
- Location: Palace of Spain; Rome
- Preceded by: Damned Soul (Bernini)
- Followed by: Aeneas, Anchises, and Ascanius

The Blessed Soul (Italian: Anima Beata) is a bust by the Italian artist Gian Lorenzo Bernini. Executed around 1619, it is a pendant piece to the Damned Soul. Their original location was sacristy of the church of San Giacomo degli Spagnuoli, but they were then moved in the late 19th century, and then to the Spanish Embassy to the Holy See in Piazza di Spagna The set may have been inspired by prints by Karel van Mallery, although they were initially categorized as nymph and satyr.

== Critical reception ==
Despite being relatively unknown, the Blessed Soul was noted by some visitors to Rome. In particular, the painter Joshua Reynolds stated that the sculpture "has all the sweetness and perfect happiness expressed in her countenance that can be imagined." However, the Blessed Soul has not been considered one of Bernini's finest works in more recent times. Wittkower points to the "doughy hair of the Anima Beata", while Hibbard finds it uninspiring when compared to the Damned Soul, mentioning that 'virtuous appearances' do not translate too well into sculpture.

Recent scholarship on the sculpture has queried whether its topic is not the Christian personifications of blessedness but a depiction of a nymph.

== See also ==
- List of works by Gian Lorenzo Bernini
