= Juankoski =

- Former municipality
- Juankosken kaupunki Juankoski stad
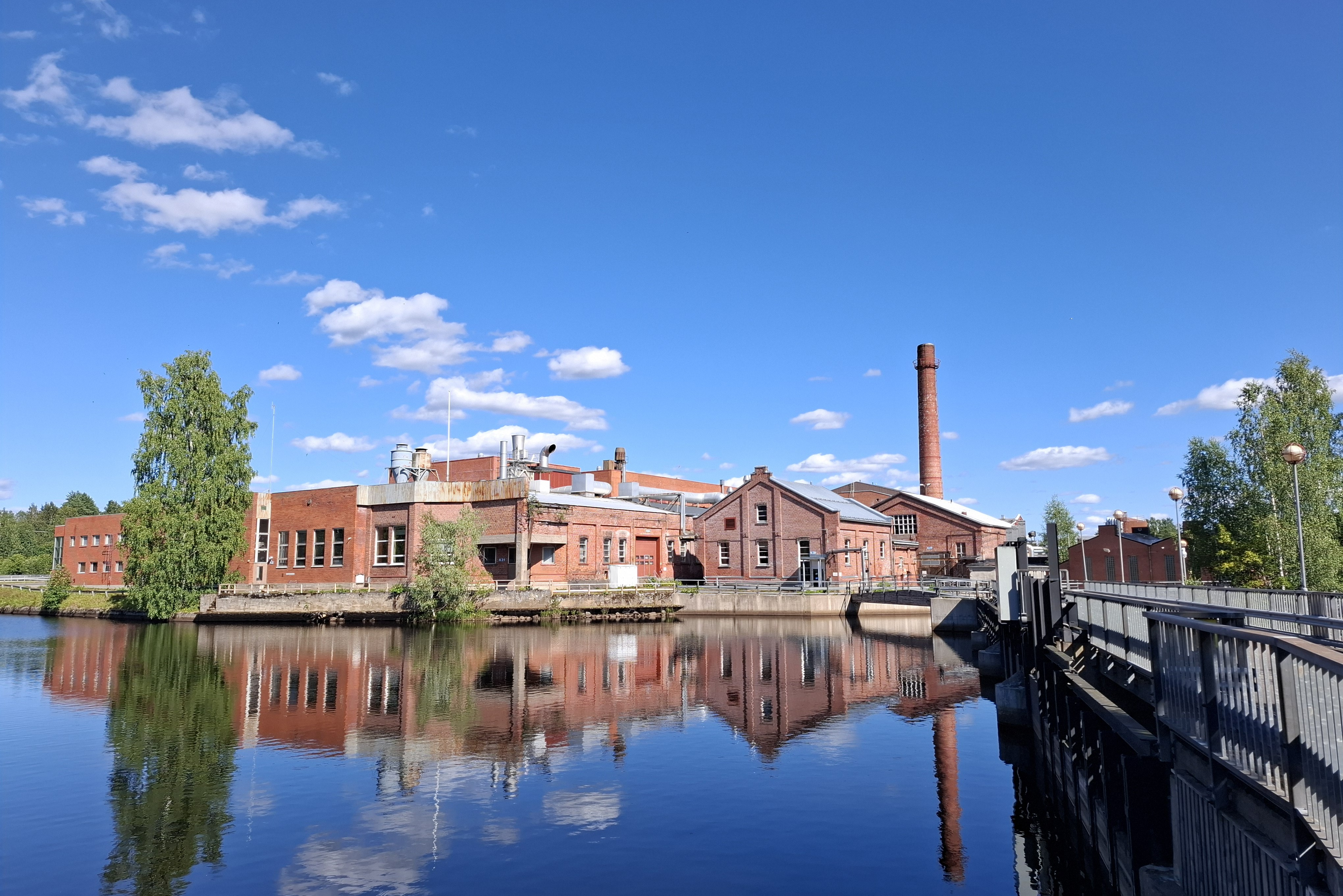
- Juankoski Ironworks

- Coat of arms

- Location of Juankoski in Finland
- Coordinates: 63°04′N 028°20′E
- Country: Finland
- Region: North Savo
- Sub-region: Northeast Savo
- Charter: 1925
- Town privileges: 1998
- Consolidated: 2017

Government
  - Municipal manager: Petri Kangasperko
- Time zone: UTC+2 (EET)
  - Summer (DST): UTC+3 (EEST)
- Website: www.juankoski.fi

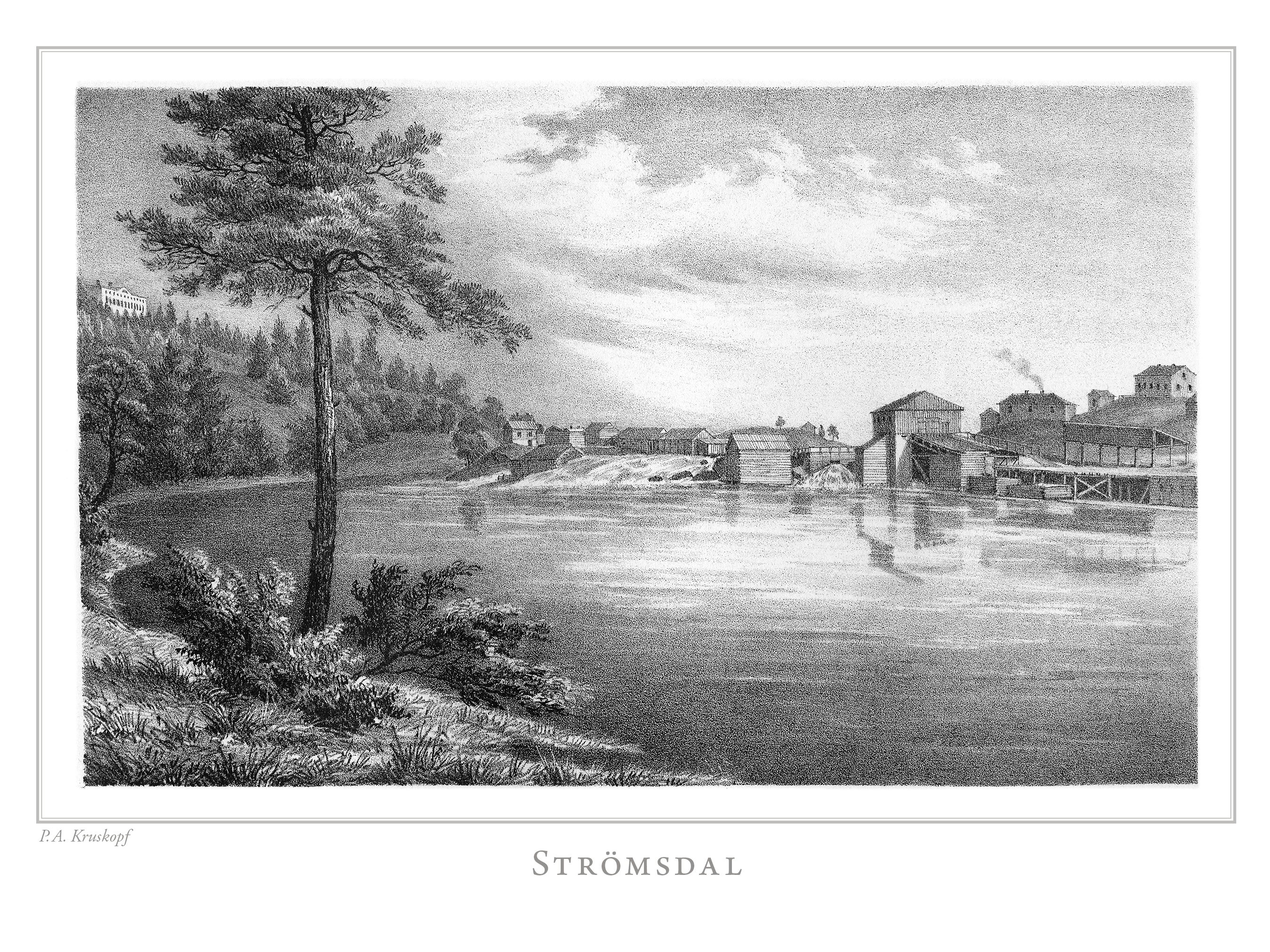
Illustration of Strömsdal bruk in Finland framstäldt i teckningar edited by Zacharias Topelius and published 1845-1852.

Juankoski is a former town and municipality of Finland. In March 2014, the Juankoski city council decided that the town would merge with Kuopio in the beginning of 2017.

Juankoski is located in the province of Eastern Finland, part of the North Savo region. It covers an area of 586.26 square kilometres (226.36 sq mi) of which 120.99 km^{2} (46.71 sq mi) is water. Juankoski formally became a town in 1998.

Neighbouring municipalities of Juankoski include Juuka, Kaavi, Tuusniemi, Kuopio, Nilsiä and Rautavaara.

The former municipality is unilingually Finnish.

== History ==
In 1746, Brynolf Brunou established an ironworks near the rapids between Vuotjärvi and Akonvesi. The area was a part of the Nilsiä chapel community of the Kuopio parish. Nilsiä became a separate parish in 1816 and a municipality in 1869. Juankoski was moved to the Muuruvesi parish in 1907, remaining a part of it until Juankoski became a separate municipality in 1923. Muuruvesi and Säyneinen were consolidated with Juankoski in 1971.

Juankoski was consolidated with Kuopio in 2017.

Museum Masuuni Brunou focuses on the area's iron and cardboard industry, as well as local history.

== Villages ==
Prior to its consolidation into Kuopio in 2017, Juankoski consisted of the following villages:

- Akonvesi, Hipanlahti, Jouhteninen (Joutseninen), Muuruvesi (village), Säyneinen (village), Vehkalahti, Västinniemi and Akonpohja (Note: The village of Akonpohja is located in address 73500.)

== People ==
- Kaj Chydenius, composer
- Jaakko Kolmonen, TV chef
- Juice Leskinen, songwriter/musician
- Anssi Neuvonen, songwriter/musician
