= Juurusvesi–Akonvesi =

Lake in Northern Savonia, Finland

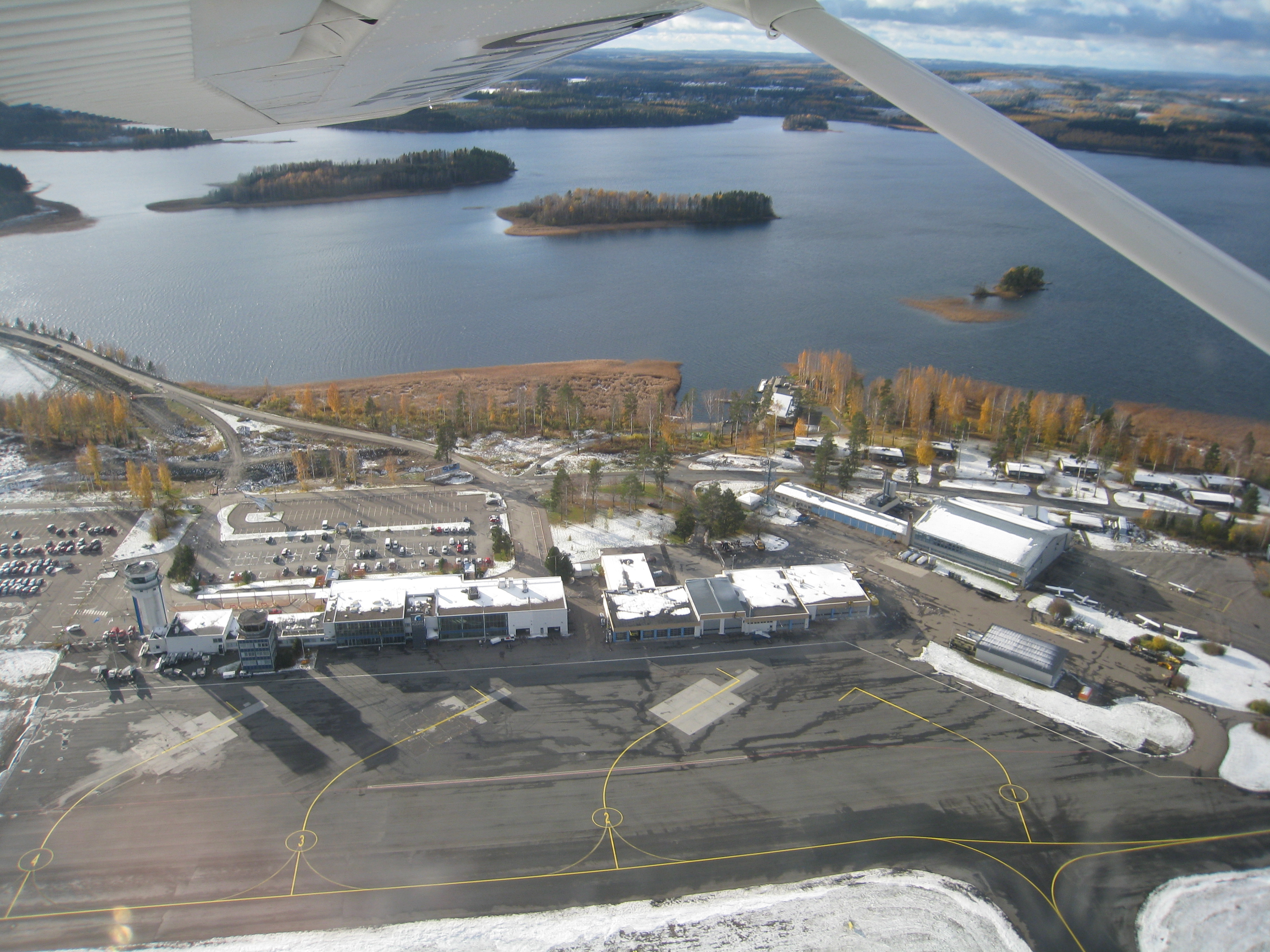
- Aerial view looking west of Kuopio Airport terminal and apron. Siilinjärvi in far background, across Lake Iso-Jälä.

- Location within Finland
- Location: Northern Savonia
- Coordinates: 62°59′N 27°55′E
- Type: Lake
- Primary inflows: from the lake Vuotjärvi via Juankoski power station
- Primary outflows: via Jännevirta to the lake Kallavesi
- Catchment area: Vuoksi
- Basin countries: Finland
- Surface area: 156.871 km^{2} (60.568 sq mi)
- Average depth: 8.31 m (27.3 ft)
- Max. depth: 61.97 m (203.3 ft)
- Water volume: 1.303 km^{3} (1,056,000 acre⋅ft)
- Shore length^{1}: 797.55 km (495.57 mi)
- Surface elevation: 81.8 m (268 ft)
- Islands: Talvisalo (5.2 km^{2} or 2.0 sq mi), Viitasalo (3.4 km^{2} or 1.3 sq mi), Rahvo, Otus
- Settlements: Siilinjärvi
- ^{1} Shore length is not a well-defined measure.

Juurusvesi–Akonvesi is a lake in Finland. It consists of two basins, Juurusvesi in west and Akonvesi in east. The town of Siilinjärvi is located on the western extremity of Juurusvesi. Kuopio Airport is located on a peninsula jutting into Juurusvesi.

== See also ==
- List of lakes in Finland
