= Riistavesi (former municipality) =

Former municipality in Finland

Coat of Arms of Riistavesi

Riistavesi is a former municipality in Finland. It was established in 1923 in Kuopio province. Riistavesi became a part of Kuopio in 1973. There were 2273 inhabitants in Riistavesi in 1970.
