= Finncattle =

Breed of cattle

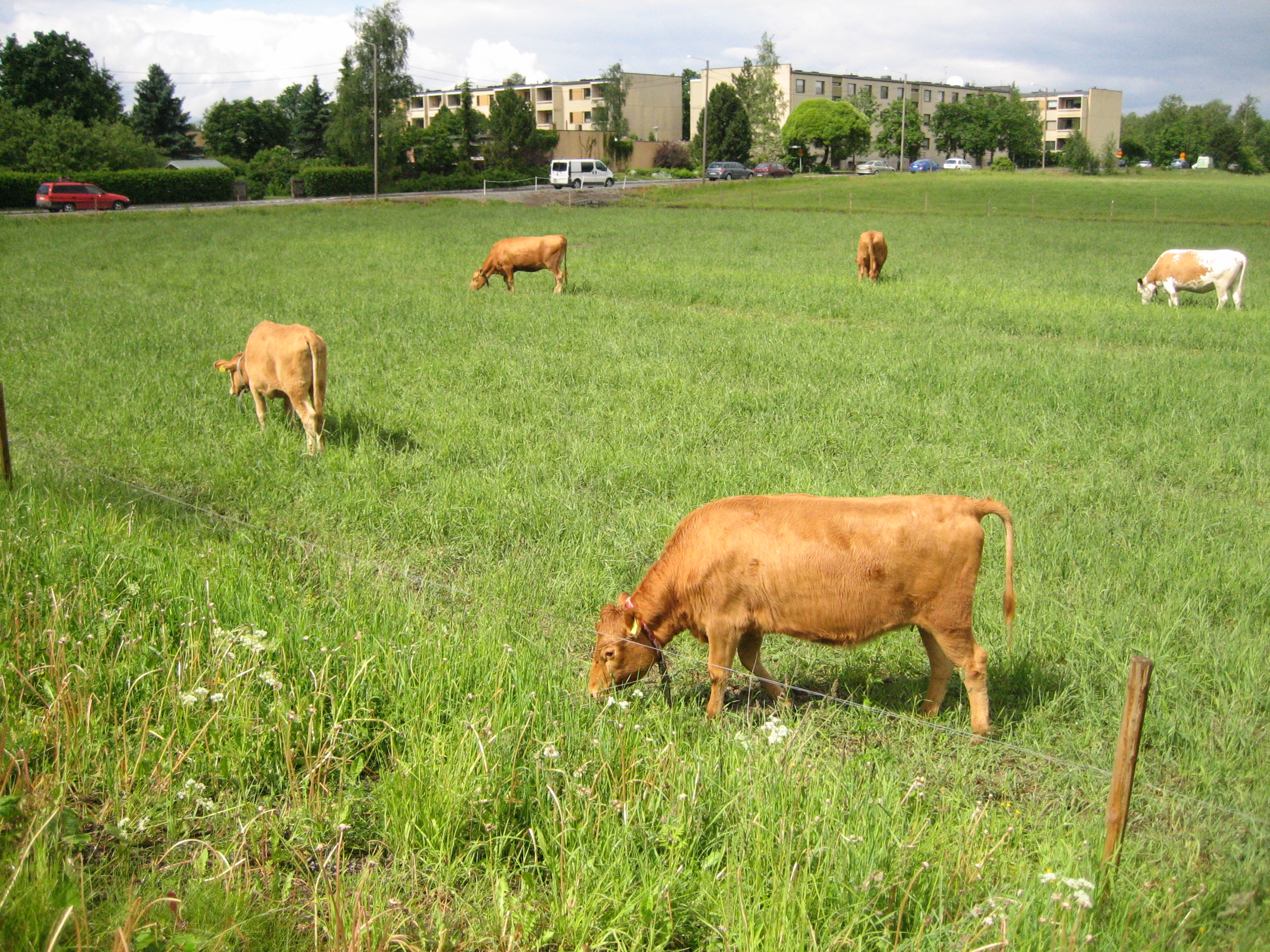
Red Western Finncattle and a spotted Eastern in Tampere.

Finncattle refers to three closely related cattle breeds of Finnish origin. Finncattle is most often kept for dairy production, and some animals are found in petting zoos and as pets. The Finncattle breeds are of small size and naturally polled. However, they differ in appearance and production levels. The Western Finncattle is red, and the largest of the three breeds. The North Finnish cattle variety are white, the West Finnish are red, while the East Finnish are both white and red.

== Properties ==
Finncattle are adapted to the Finnish climate and conditions. They can successfully be kept on forest pasture. Finncattle tend to be long-living and have good fertility. The fat and protein contents of the milk are higher than those of the other dairy breeds in Finland. However, milk production levels are significantly lower than in other breeds. Moreover, the typically curious and willful nature of Finncattle combined with the breed's tendency to fatten rather than produce more milk when fed extra may cause problems for farmers used to other dairy breeds.

== Breeds ==
The three Finncattle breeds are the Eastern Finncattle, the Northern Finncattle, and the Western Finncattle. The Western breed has the highest milk production and is the most prevalent of the three. Both the Eastern and Northern breeds are endangered with circa 300 head each. The Finncattle breeds were originally established as separate breeds at the turn of the 20th century. With the growing popularity of more modern, imported dairy breeds, their numbers have declined greatly. The stud books were merged in the latter half of the 20th century, and the Western breed was selected as the official, desirable type for the new combined Finncattle breed. However, the three types remained distinct, and are considered separate breeds today, despite the shared studbook.

The Finnish celebrity and artist Miina Äkkijyrkkä is known as a spokesman for Finncattle, and especially as a breeder and great afficiando of the Eastern Finncattle.

== Breeding ==
There are many problems related to breeding Finncattle. The breeds were established relatively late, and even after the founding of the studbooks the breeding has been done on a small scale. After World War II, foreign, modern dairy cattle breeds were imported to Finland in growing numbers, and the amount of Finncattle diminished quickly: in 1960, there were still almost 60.000 Finncattle cows recorded, ten years later 7.000, and in 2005 as little as 2.500. In addition to the small numbers, the breeding has been affected by the fact that after the war there were many highly popular bulls. For example, a Western Finncattle animal that does not have the 1960s bull Opari SSS 13088 in its pedigree is a rare find. Inbreeding is another problem with the breeds, since private cattle breeders have had the tendency to strongly favour the few best-rated bulls.

Western Finncattle can be bred for quality and production, but for the time being, the breeding of the endangered Eastern and Northern breeds is, by necessity, concentrated on preserving and broadening their gene pools.
