= Niskanen =

Niskanen is a Finnish surname. Notable people with the surname include:

- Esko Niskanen (1928–2013), Finnish politician
- Heikki Niskanen (1896–1962), Finnish farmer and politician
- Henrik Niskanen (1873–1951), Finnish farmer and politician
- Hugo Niskanen (1920–2014), Finnish long-distance runner
- Iivo Niskanen (born 1992), Finnish cross-country skier
- Inka Niskanen (born 1974), Finnish air force officer
- Ilmari Niskanen (born 1997), Finnish professional footballer
- Jyrki Niskanen (born 1956), Finnish opera singer
- Kerttu Niskanen (born 1988), Finnish cross-country skier
- Matt Niskanen (born 1986), American ice hockey player
- Mika Niskanen (born 1973), Finnish ice hockey player
- Mikko Niskanen (1929–1990), Finnish film director
- Tanja Niskanen (born 1992), Finnish ice hockey player
- Ville Niskanen (1887–1970), Finnish diplomat
- William A. Niskanen (1933–2011), American economist, after whom the Niskanen Center is named

== See also ==
- Niskanen Center, Washington, D.C.–based think tank
