= Telkkämäki Nature Reserve =

Open-air museum and heritage farm in Kaavi, Finland

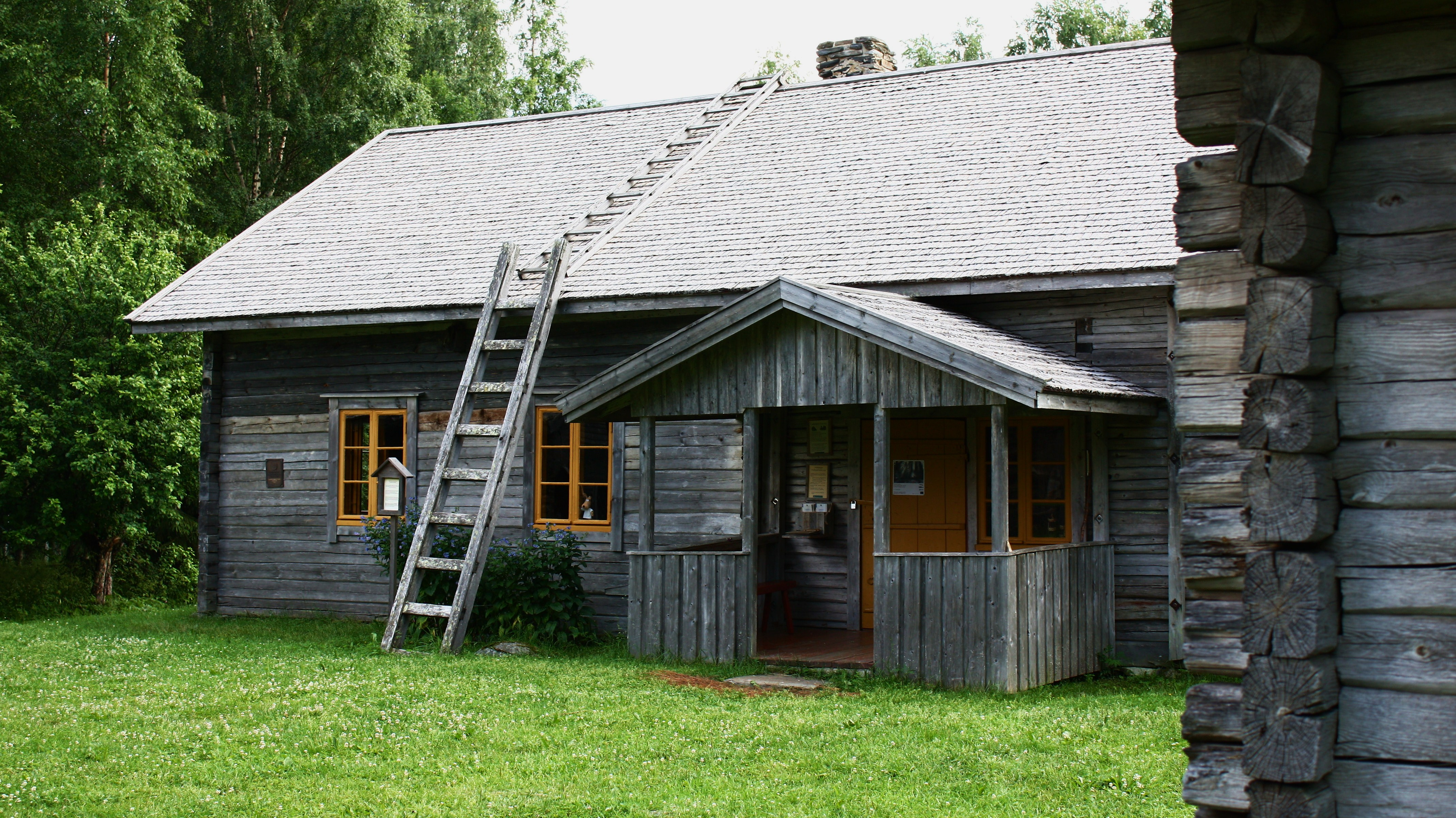
- Telkkämäki farm dates to the beginning of the 20th century.

- Location within Finland
- Location: Northern Savonia, Finland
- Coordinates: 63°02′20″N 28°29′32″E
- Established: 1989
- Visitors: 2000 (in 2020)
- Governing body: Metsähallitus
- Website: www.luontoon.fi/telkkamaki

The Telkkämäki Nature Reserve (in Finnish: Telkkämäen luonnonsuojelualue or Telkkämäen kaskiperinnetila) is an open-air museum and a heritage farm in the municipality of Kaavi, in the Northern Savonia region of Finland. It covers one square kilometer (0.39 sq mi).

The reserve was established in 1989, allowing visitors to see how people lived and farmed when slash-and-burn agriculture was practiced in Eastern Finland in the 15th century. Some areas of Telkkämäki are still burned annually.

The area is managed by a state-owned enterprise, Metsähallitus, which manages most of the protected areas in Finland.

== Natural environment ==
Telkkämäki Nature Reserve is mostly covered by green-leafed forests, its most typical trees are alder and birch. There are also many damp forests around the farm.

Wild berries such as wild strawberries (Fragaria vesca) and wild blueberries (bilberries) grow in the forests of Telkkämäki.

Among the many bird species in the reserve are the chaffinch, the common blackbird and the willow warbler. The Arctic warbler (Phylloscopus borealis) and the greenish warbler (Phylloscopus trochiloides) also nest there.

There are three brooks in the area.

== Slash-and-burn agriculture ==
Metsähallitus has been practicing slash-and-burn agriculture at Telkkämäki since 1993. Turnip and rye are typical crops grown on a Telkkämäki farm. The rye is indigenous to this area, and samples are saved in a gene bank. Barley, buckwheat, flax and oat are also grown on the fields of this demonstration farm.

There are many fields and meadows in the Telkkämäki heritage farm because of the mowing and grazing of the grounds associated with agriculture. Plant species in the old slash-and-burn clearings include the bluebutton (or field scabious), common yarrow (Achillea millefolium) and rough hawkbit. Meadow flowers to be found in Telkkämäki include the fireweed, meadow buttercup, wild angelica and red campion.

The bristly bellflower (Campanula cervicaria) grows in Telkkämäki. It is a threatened species in Finland.

== Sights ==
There is an authentic farm and farmyard in Telkkämäki Nature Reserve that dates to the beginning of the 20th century. In the summer, Telkkämäki is a lively sight with farm animals such as the finnhorse, eastern finncattle and finnsheep on the fields. There are also some hens and a rooster.

There are two marked nature trails through the fields and forested land. It is possible to see the areas which have been molded by slash-and-burn fires. In the summer there is a Metsähallitus guide in Telkkämäki.

== Gallery ==
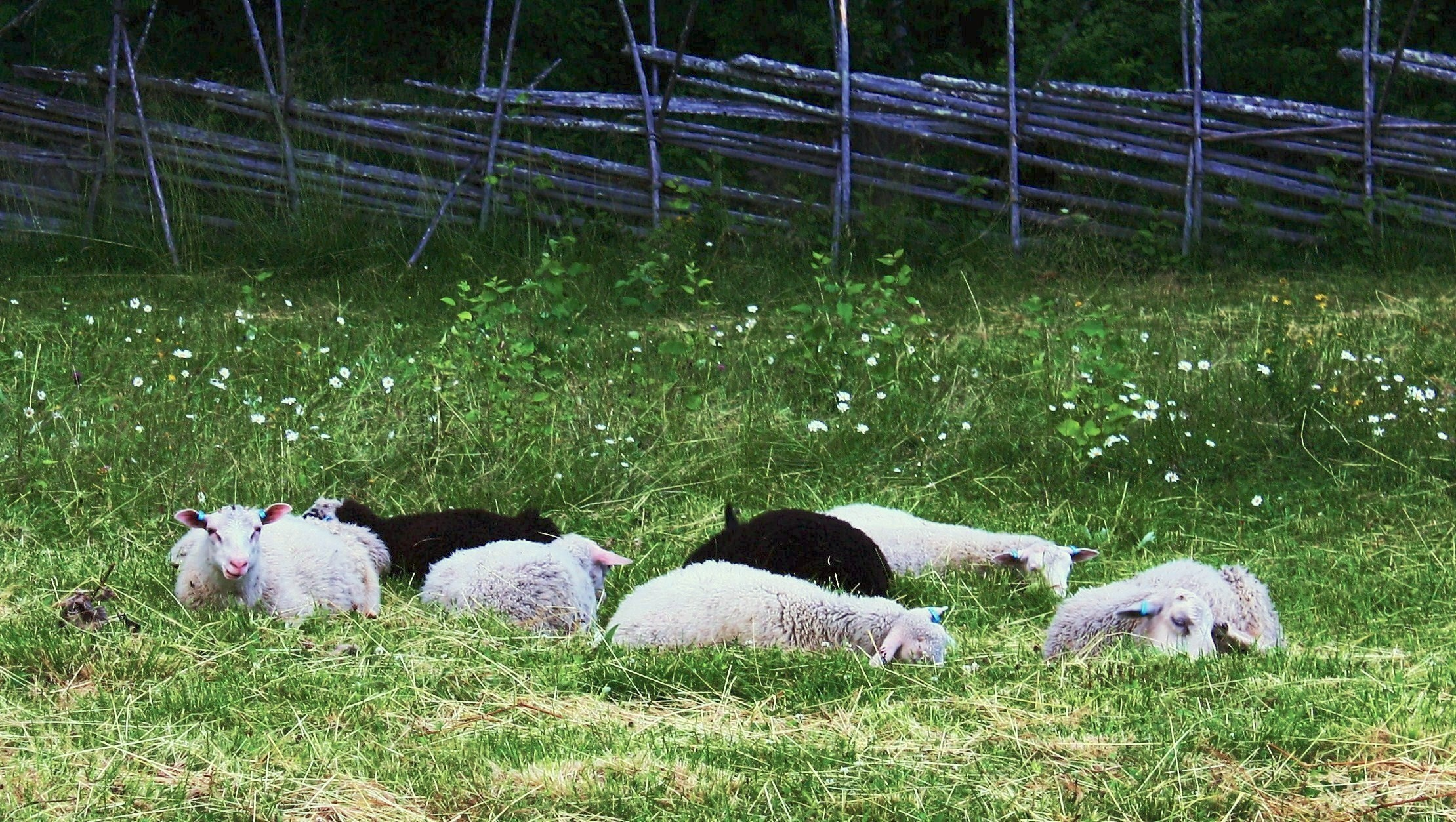
Finnsheep of Telkkämäki.

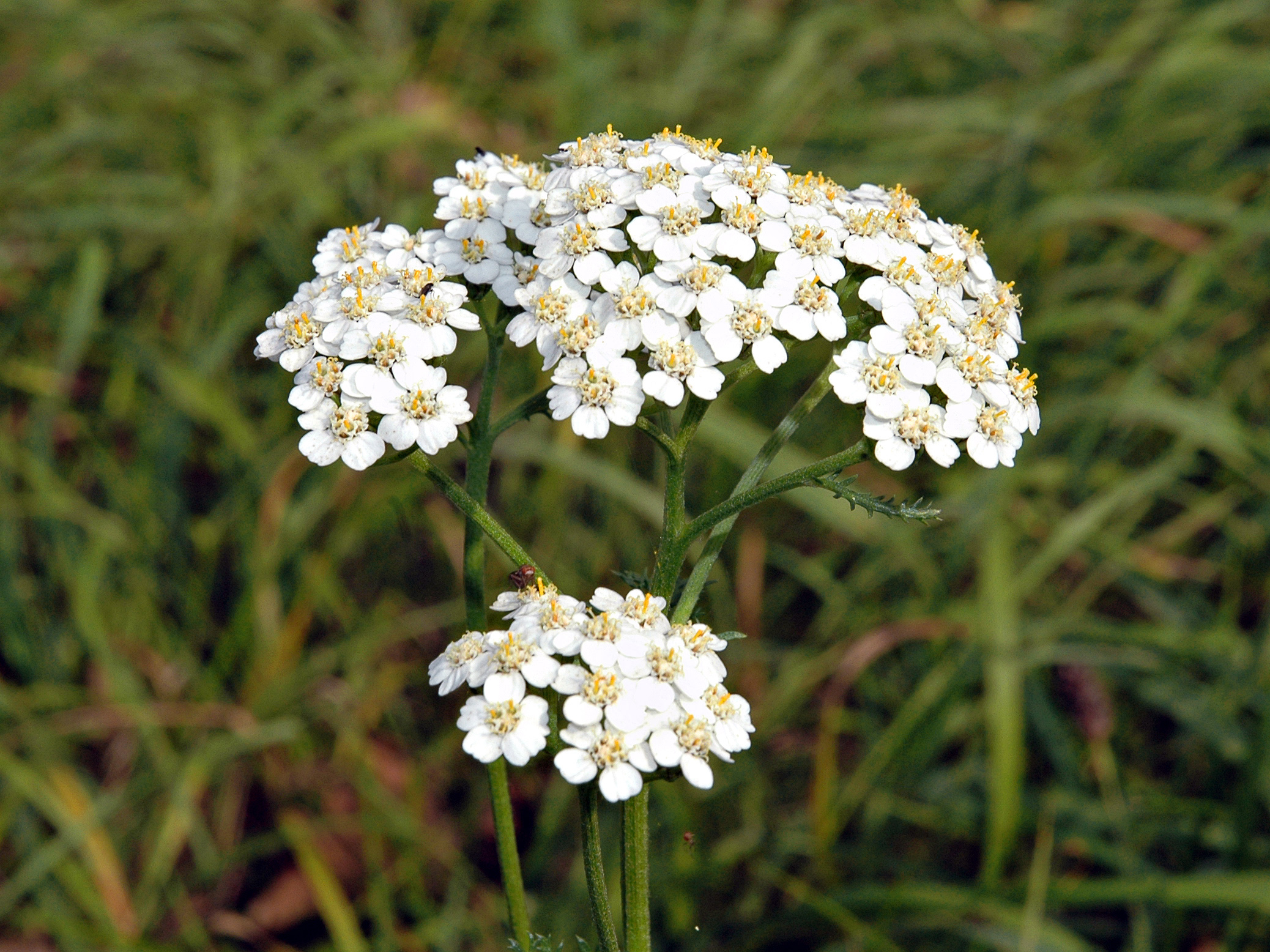
Common yarrow (Achillea millefolium).

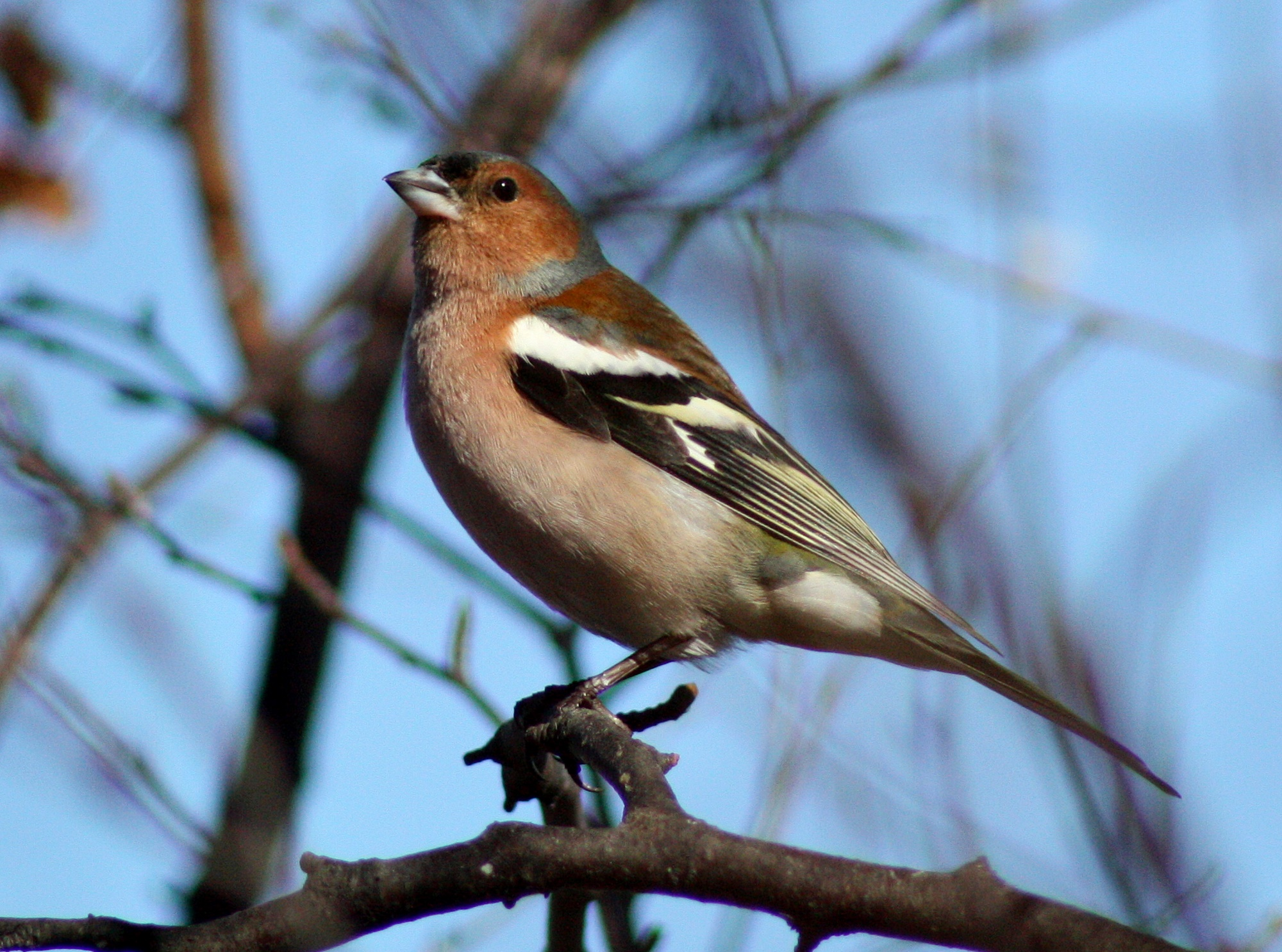
Common chaffinch (Fringilla coelebs).

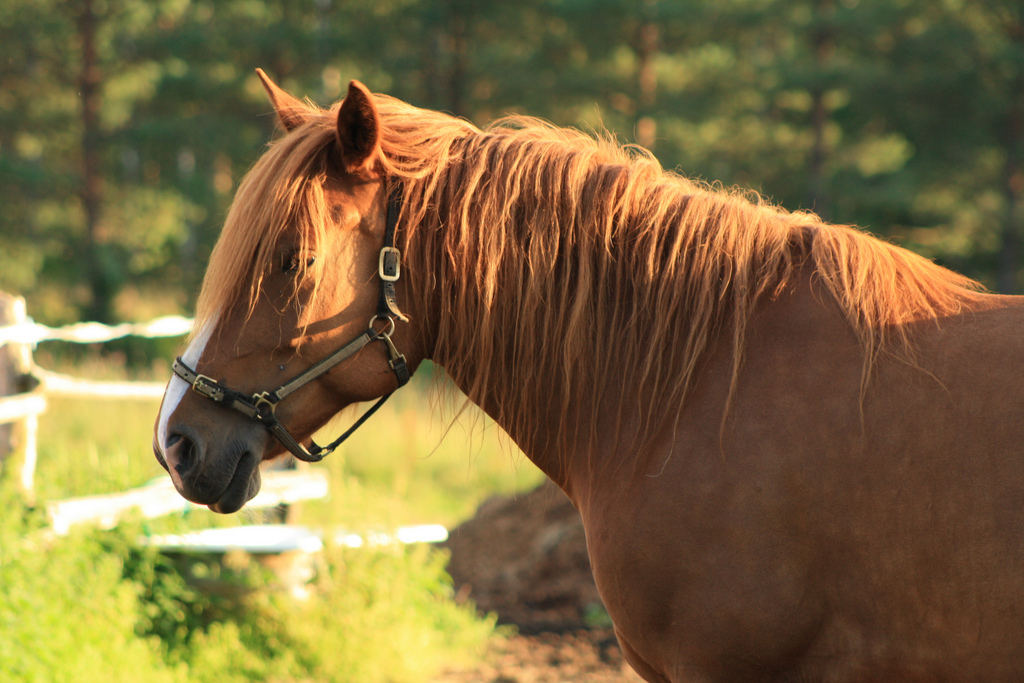
A Finnhorse.

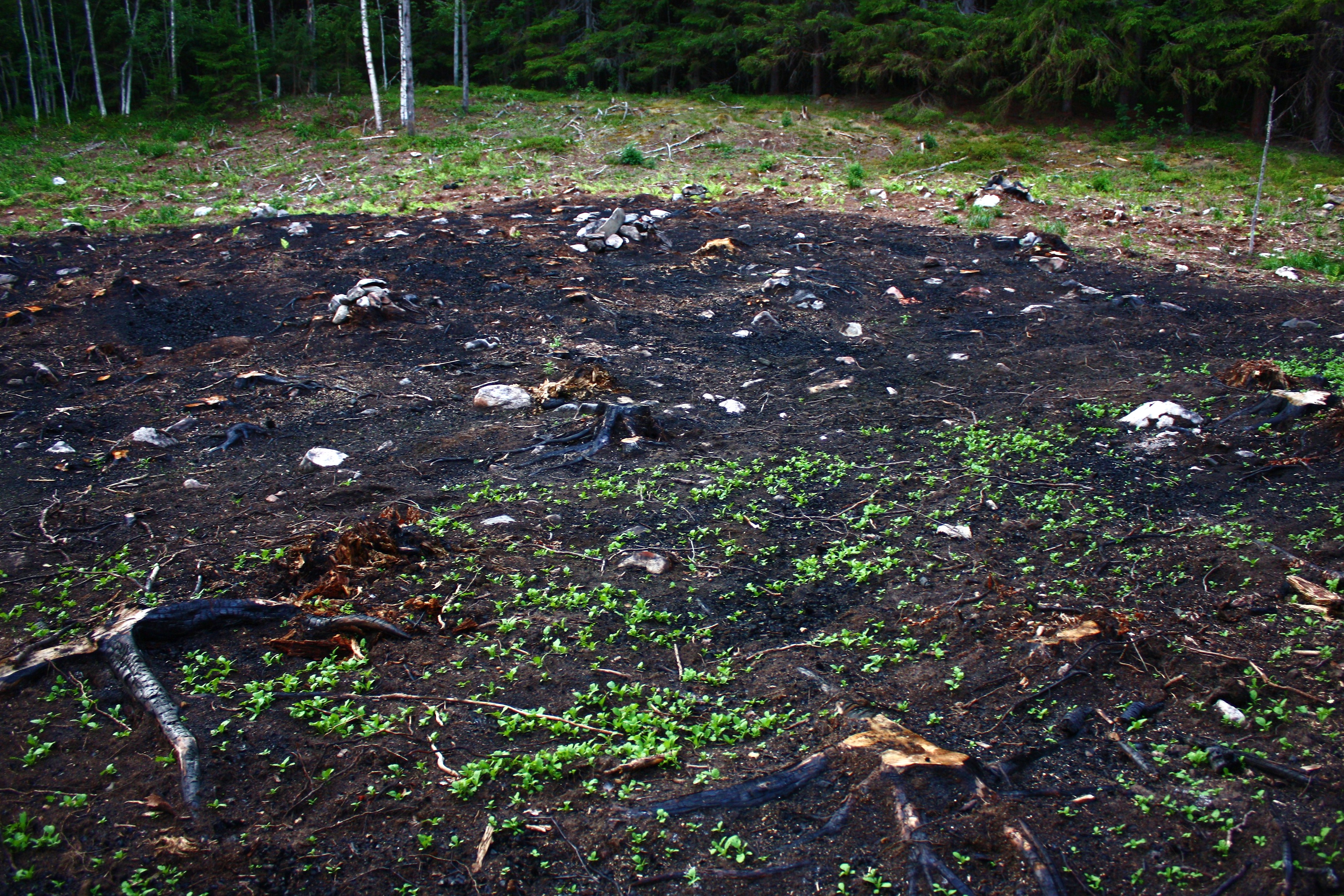
Slashed-and-burned soil.

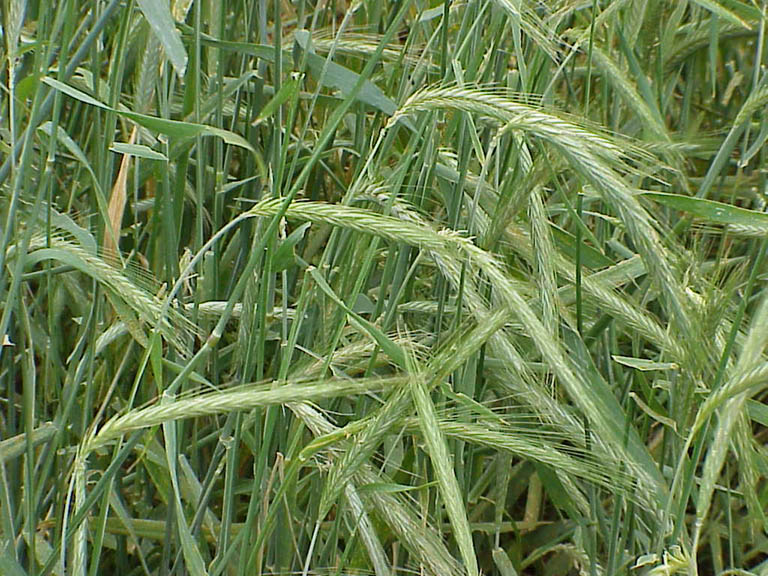
Rye
