= Slash-and-burn agriculture =

Agricultural practice

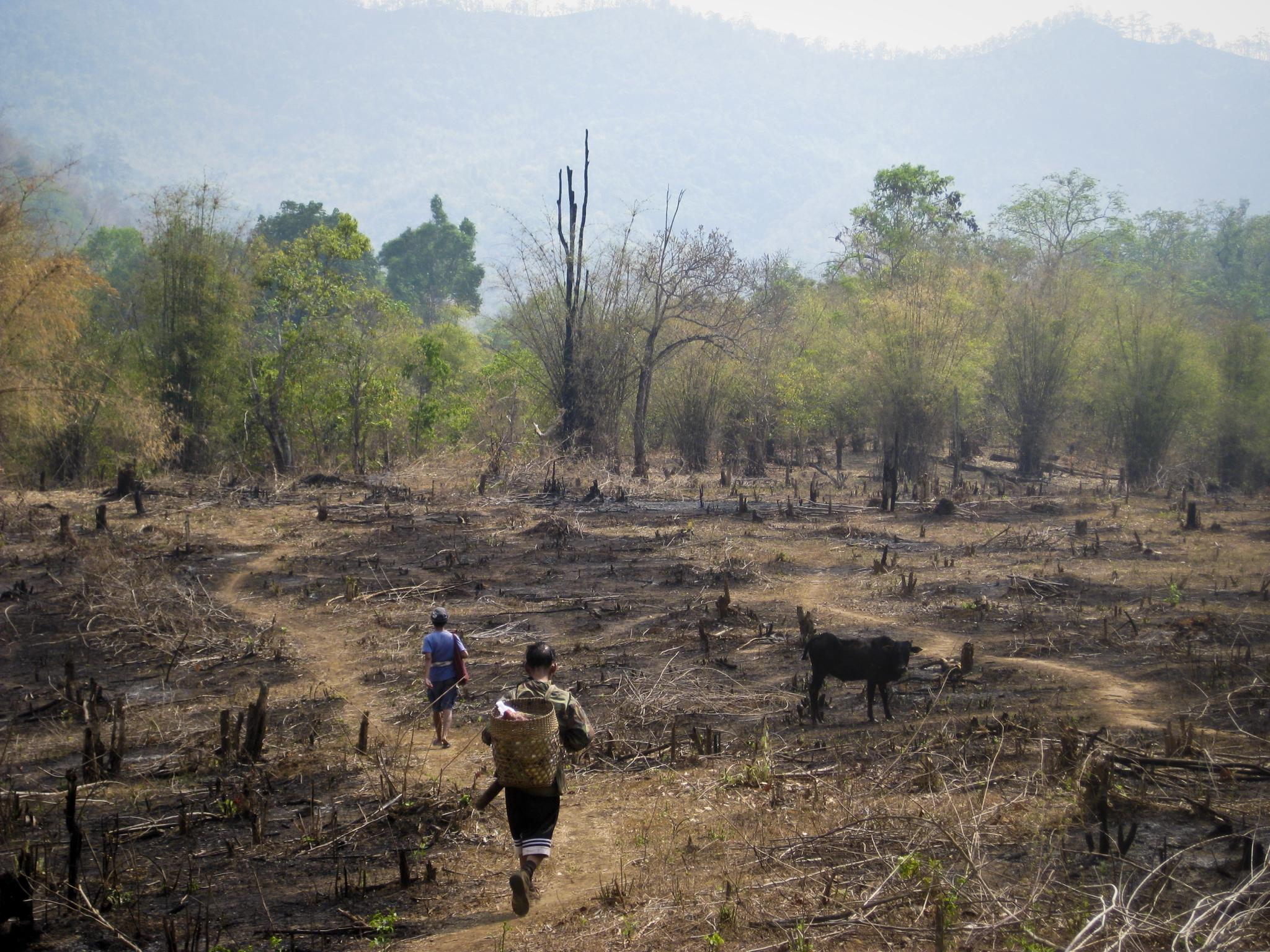
Slash-and-burn agriculture in Chiang Mai, Thailand

Slash-and-burn agriculture is a form of shifting cultivation in agriculture that involves the cutting and burning of plants in a forest or woodland to create a field called a swidden. The process begins with cutting down the trees and woody plants in a given area. The downed vegetation, or "slash", is left out to dry, usually right before the rainiest part of the year. The biomass is then burned, resulting in a nutrient-rich layer of ash which increases soil fertility and temporarily eliminates weeds and pests. After about three to five years, the plot's productivity decreases due to depletion of nutrients along with weed and pest invasion, causing farmers to abandon the plot and move to a new area. The time it takes for a swidden to recover depends on the location and can be as little as five years to more than twenty years, after which the plot can be slashed and burned again, repeating the cycle. In Bangladesh and India, the practice is known as jhum or jhoom.

A rough estimate says that about 200–300 million people worldwide use slash-and-burn agricultural techniques. Slash-and-burn causes deforestation and habitat loss. Ashes from the burnt trees help farmers by providing nutrients for the soil. While slash-and-burn agriculture has historically been sustainable in areas with low population density, increasing populations have accelerated the rate of deforestation, depleting the Earth's carbon reservoirs.

== History ==
Historically, slash-and-burn cultivation has been practiced throughout much of the world. Fire was already used by hunter-gatherers before the invention of agriculture, and still is in present times. Clearings created by the fire were made for many reasons, such as to provide new growth for game animals and to promote certain kinds of edible plants.

During the Neolithic Revolution, groups of hunter-gatherers domesticated various plants and animals, permitting them to settle down and practice agriculture, which provided more nutrition per hectare than hunting and gathering. Some groups could easily plant their crops in open fields along river valleys, but others had forests covering their land. Thus, since Neolithic times, slash-and-burn agriculture has been widely used to clear land to make it suitable for crops and livestock.

Large groups wandering in the woodlands was once a common form of society in European prehistory. The extended family burned and cultivated their swidden plots, sowed one or more crops, and then proceeded on to the next plot.

== Technique ==
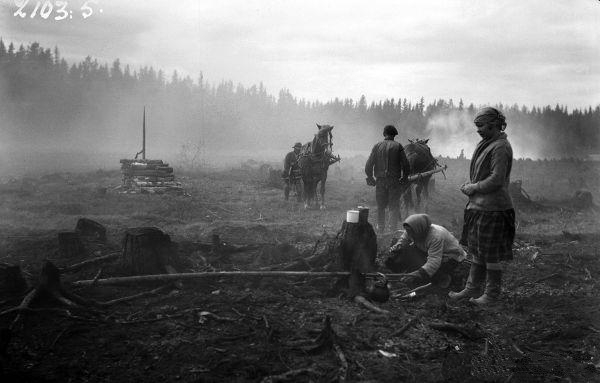
Slash-and-burn agriculture in Maaninka, Finland, in the 1920s

Slash-and-burn fields are typically used and owned by a family until the soil is exhausted. At this point the ownership rights are abandoned, the family clears a new field, and trees and shrubs are permitted to grow on the former field. After a few decades, another family or clan may then use the land and claim usufructuary rights. In such a system there is typically no market in farmland, so land is not bought or sold on the open market and land rights are traditional.

In slash-and-burn agriculture, forests are typically cut months before a dry season. The "slash" is permitted to dry and then burned in the following dry season. The resulting ash fertilizes the soil and the burned field is then planted at the beginning of the next rainy season with crops such as rice, maize, cassava, or other staples. This work was once done using simple tools such as machetes, axes, hoes and shovels.

== Benefits and drawbacks ==
This system of agriculture provides millions of people with food and income. It has been ecologically sustainable for thousands of years. Because the leached soil in many tropical regions, such as the Amazon, are nutritionally extremely poor, slash-and-burn is one of the only types of agriculture which can be practiced in these areas. Slash-and-burn farmers typically plant a variety of crops, instead of a monoculture, and contribute to a higher biodiversity due to creating mosaic habitats. The general ecosystem is not harmed in traditional slash-and-burn, aside from a small temporary patch.

This technique is most unsuitable for the production of cash crops. A huge amount of land, or a low density of people, is required for sustainable slash-and-burn. When slash-and-burn is practiced in the same area too often, e.g., because the human population density has increased to an unsustainable level, the forest will eventually be destroyed.

== Regionally ==
=== Asia ===
Tribal groups in the northeastern Indian states of Tripura, Arunachal Pradesh, Meghalaya, Mizoram and Nagaland and the Bangladeshi districts of Rangamati, Khagrachari, Bandarban and Sylhet refer to slash-and-burn agriculture as podu, jhum or jhoom cultivation. The system involves clearing land, by fire or clear-felling, for economically important crops such as upland rice, vegetables or fruits. After a few cycles, the land's fertility declines and a new area is chosen. Jhum cultivation is most often practiced on the slopes of thickly-forested hills. Cultivators cut the treetops to allow sunlight to reach the land, burning the trees and grasses for fresh soil. Although it is believed that this helps fertilize the land, it can leave it vulnerable to erosion. Holes are made for the seeds of crops such as sticky rice, maize, eggplant and cucumber. After considering jhum's effects, the government of Mizoram has introduced a policy to end the method in the state.

Vietnam is home to a diverse range of ethnic groups. Some of these groups form primarily rural communities that reside far from the larger cities of the country, living on swidden fields where slash-and-burn agriculture is still in regular use as a part of everyday life.

=== Americas ===
Some American civilizations, like the Maya, have used slash-and-burn cultivation since ancient times. Native Americans in the United States also used fire in agriculture and hunting. In the Amazon, many peoples such as the Yanomami Indians also live off the slash and burn method due to the Amazon's poor soil quality.

Indigenous peoples in what is now modern-day Brazil also utilized slash-and-burn agriculture as land management in the Atlantic Forest prior to European colonization.

=== Portugal ===
In Portugal, slash-and-burn agriculture was historically known as roças and queimadas. Until the early 20th century, it was a pervasive element of the rural economy, particularly in the southern regions of Beira Baixa and Alentejo, as well as in mountain areas. The French historian Albert Silbert, in his study of the region's agrarian history, described the practice as a "mode of production that occupied a central place in agricultural life," noting similarities to tropical swidden systems.

The traditional agricultural cycle involved cutting vegetation in the spring, allowing it to dry, and burning it in August. The ash fertilized the soil for the cultivation of cereals such as rye, wheat, and barley, which were planted with the onset of the first rains. This practice supported a socio-ecological mosaic of cultivated fields, moors (charnecas), common lands (baldios), and woodlands.

The decline of slash-and-burn in Portugal began with the rise of the modern liberal state in the 19th century, which privatized common lands and confiscated ecclesial properties. Enlightened agrarian reformers increasingly characterized the practice as backward and destructive. In 1886, the newly established Forestry Service banned queimadas within 200 meters of state forests, a distance extended to one kilometer in 1926.

The eradication of the practice accelerated under the Estado Novo dictatorship (1933–1974). Policies such as the Wheat Campaign of 1929 and the Afforestation Law of 1938 sought to transform uncultivated moors into wheat monocultures and upland commons into state forests. These "fascist modernist landscapes" were designed to exclude fire, backed by scientific forestry narratives that viewed swidden cultivation as primitive. By the mid-1960s, state-sponsored afforestation—often utilizing fast-growing species like Eucalyptus globulus for the pulp industry—had further marginalized traditional fire use.

While roças and queimadas have largely vanished, modern experts argue that the exclusion of fire contributed to the severity of contemporary wildfires. The accumulation of fuel loads, combined with rural flight and monoculture plantations, has created a landscape prone to destructive mega-fires, leading some researchers to reconsider the utility of traditional fire management techniques.

=== Northern Europe ===
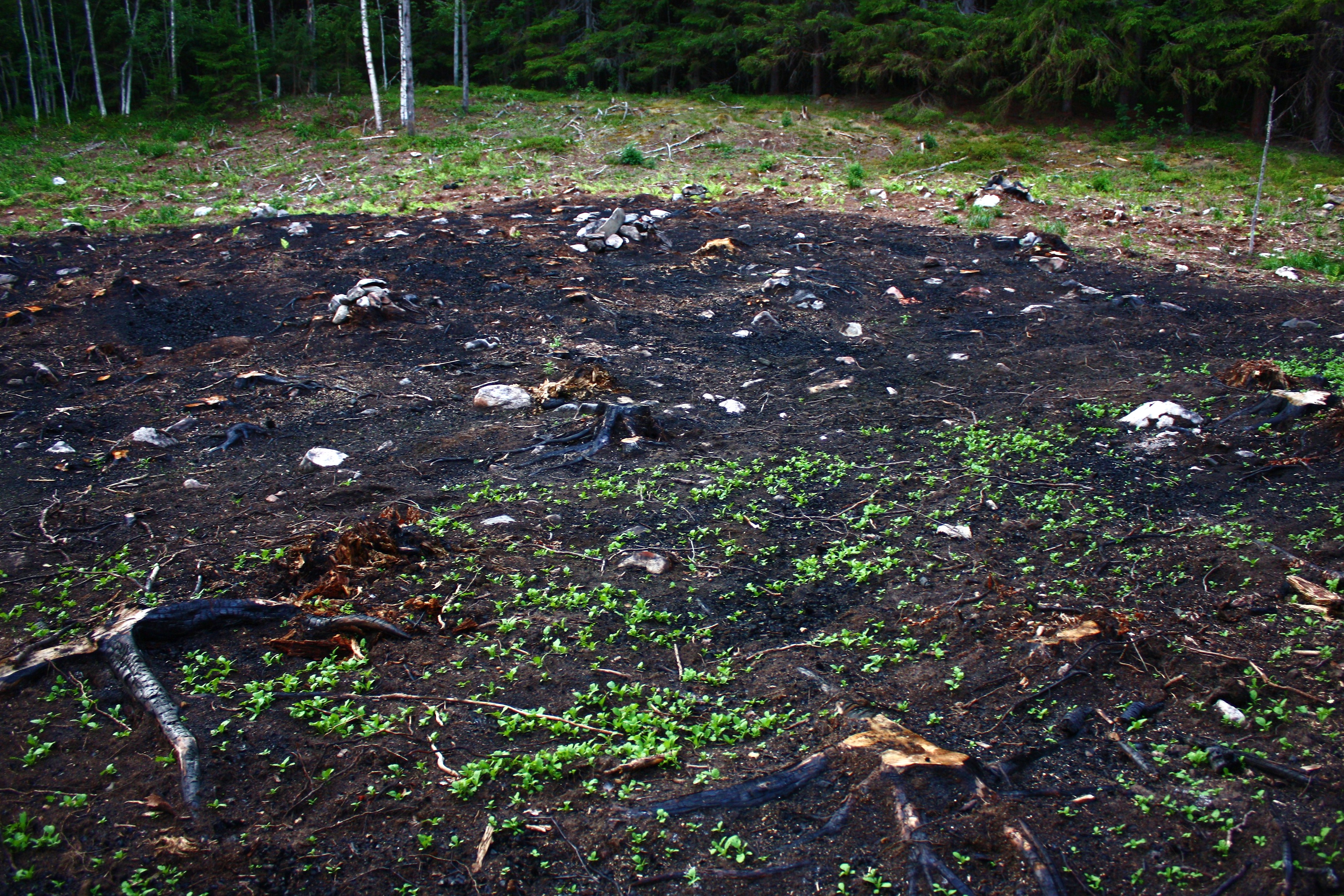
A recently burned area at the Telkkämäki Heritage Farm in Finland, demonstrating the technique.

Slash-and-burn techniques were used in northeastern Sweden in agricultural systems. In Sweden, the practice is known as svedjebruk.

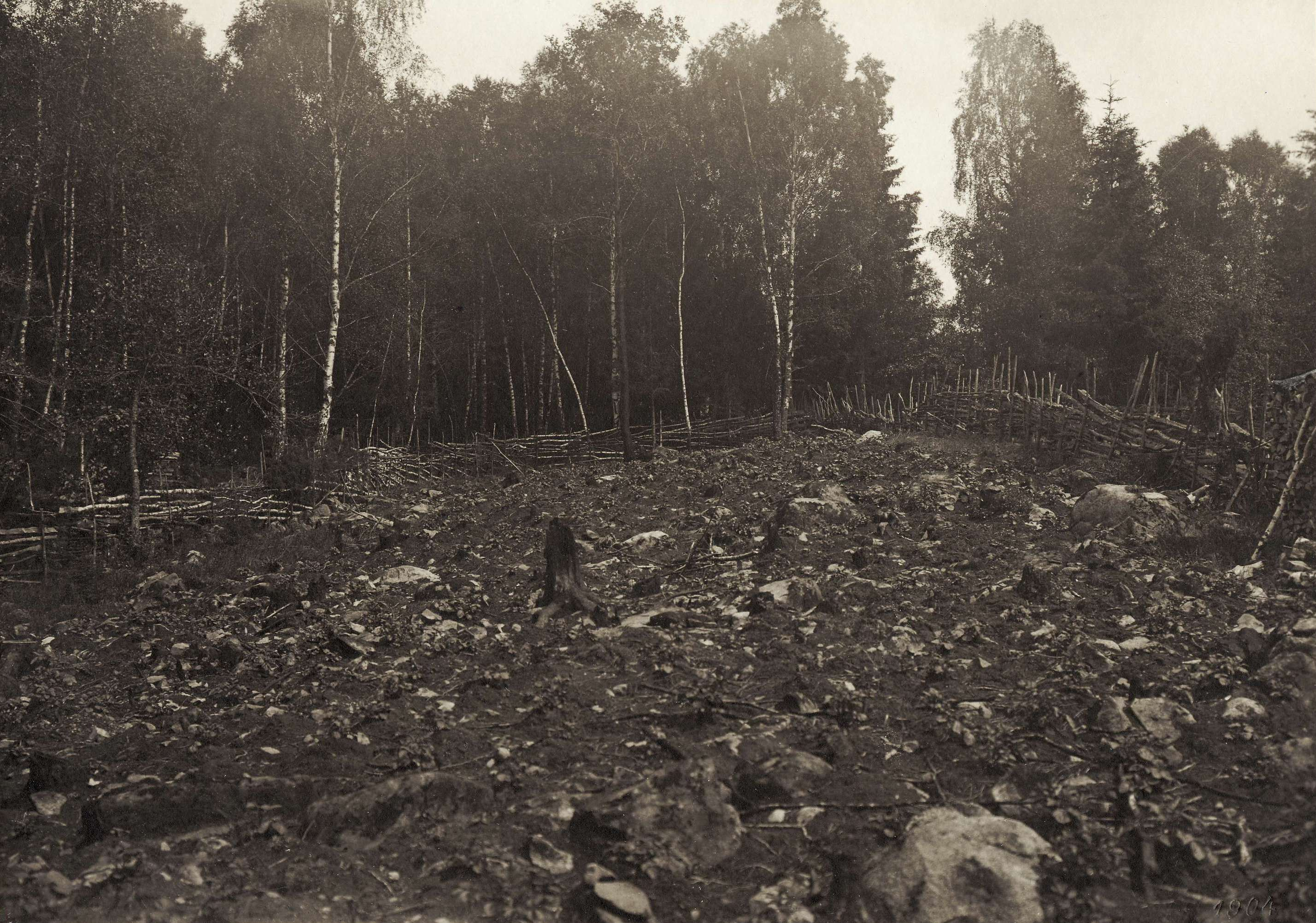
Slash-and-burn in Småland, Sweden (1904)

Telkkämäki Nature Reserve in Kaavi, Finland, is an open-air museum where slash-and-burn agriculture is demonstrated. Farm visitors can see how people farmed when slash-and-burn was the norm in the Northern Savonian region of eastern Finland beginning in the 15th century. Areas of the reserve are burnt each year.

==== Svedjebruk ====
Svedjebruk is a form of slash-and-burn agriculture practiced in Sweden and Norway. It originated in Russia in the region of Novgorod and was widespread in Finland and Eastern Sweden during the Medieval period. It spread to western Sweden in the 16th century when Finnish settlers were encouraged to migrate there by King Gustav Vasa to help clear the dense forests. Later, when the Finns were persecuted by the local Swedes, svedjebruk farming was spread by refugees to eastern Norway, more specifically in the eastern part of Solør, in the area bordering Sweden known as Finnskogen ("the Finnish woods").

The practice spread to New Sweden in North America. Reinforced by the use of fire in agriculture and hunting by American Indians, it became an important part of pioneering in America.

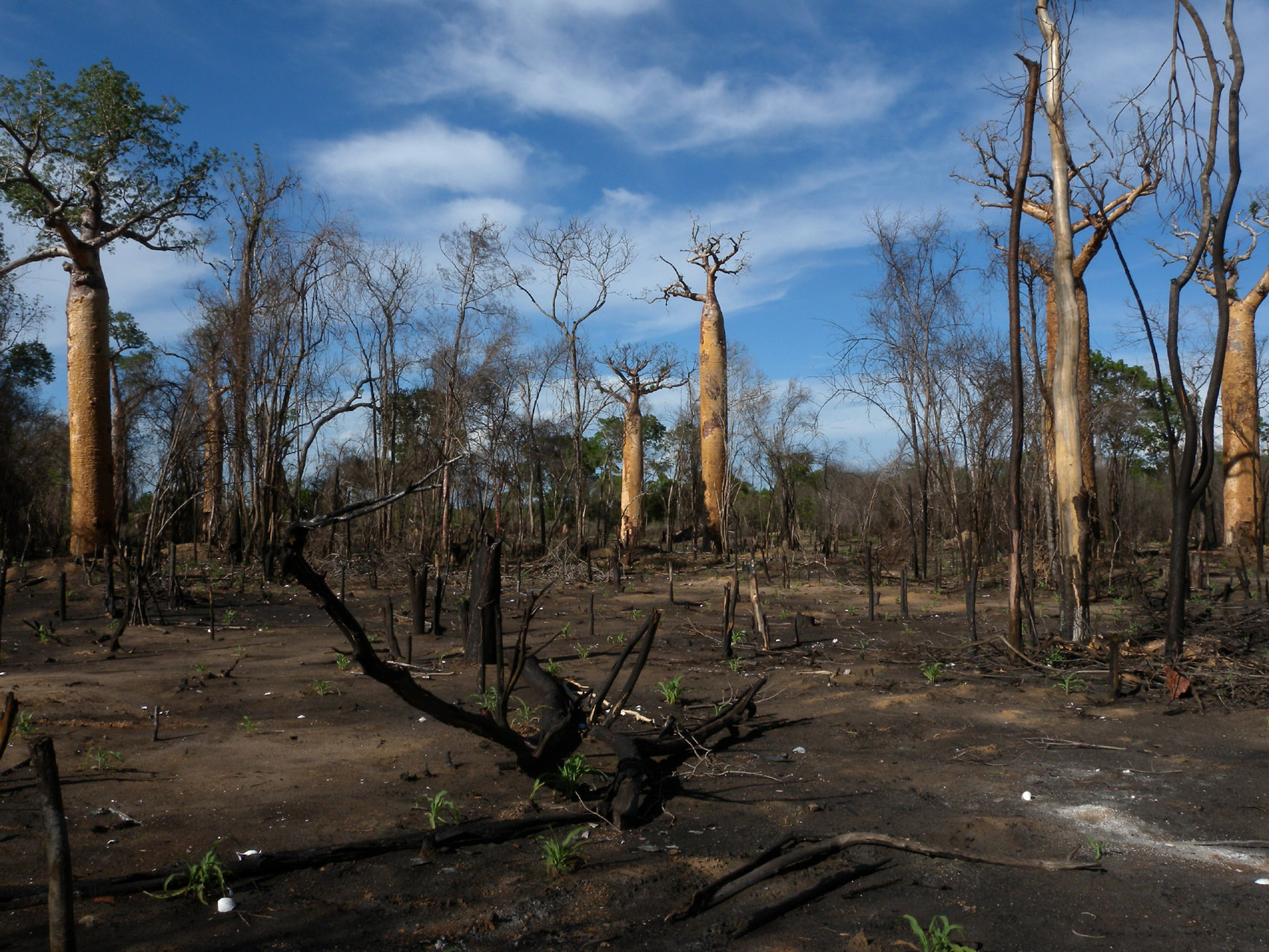
Lemurs in dry deciduous forests of Madagascar are threatened by deforestation for the creation of farmland and pasture.

===== Description of process =====
Svedjebruk involved stripping a ring of bark completely around the trunk of coniferous trees like pine or spruce or felling them, allowing them to dry, setting fire to the dried forest and growing crops on the fertile ash-covered soil. The resulting ash was highly fertile, but only for a short period. The clearing was initially planted to rye as soon as the ash had fully settled and sufficiently cooled. When the rain came, it packed the ash around the rye. The rye germinated and grew prolifically, with anywhere from 25 to 100 stalks (or straws), each with multiple grains.

Only two tools were required, the axe and the sickle. The axe cut the trees to start the cycle. When the rye had ripened, it was harvested with a sickle, which could reach among the rocks and stumps where a scythe would have been ineffective.

In the second and third year the field would be sown with turnips or cabbages. It then might be grazed for several years before being allowed to return to woodland.

===== Svedjebruk culture =====
Svedjebruk required felling new forest and burning a new area every year. It was necessary to allow the former fields to regrow with forest for 10–30 years before repeating the cycle. As a result, the dwellings were often many kilometers from the fields. Furthermore, since the process was man-power intensive, extended families tended to work together and live in compact communities.

The svedjebruk farming approach required a large area. When forest was plentiful, the Finns were very prosperous. As population grew and restrictions were placed on the forest which could be burned, it became increasingly difficult. By 1710, during the conflict with Sweden, because of their suspect loyalties Norwegian authorities considered expelling them from the border area, but did not do so because it was judged they were too poor to survive if evicted.

== Research ==
Not allowing the slashed vegetation to burn completely and ploughing the resultant charcoal into the soil (slash-and-char) has been proposed as a way to boost yields.

Promoters of a project from the early 2000s claimed that slash-and-burn cultivation could be reduced if farmers grew black pepper crops, turmeric, beans, corn, cacao, rambutan, and citrus between Inga trees, which they termed 'Inga alley cropping'.

A method of improving the yields in a type of traditional assarting cultivation used to grow common beans in Central America called 'slash-and-cover' has been proposed by additionally planting leguminous shrubs to act as a fallow crop after the soil is exhausted and one is ready to clear a new patch of forest.

== Gallery ==
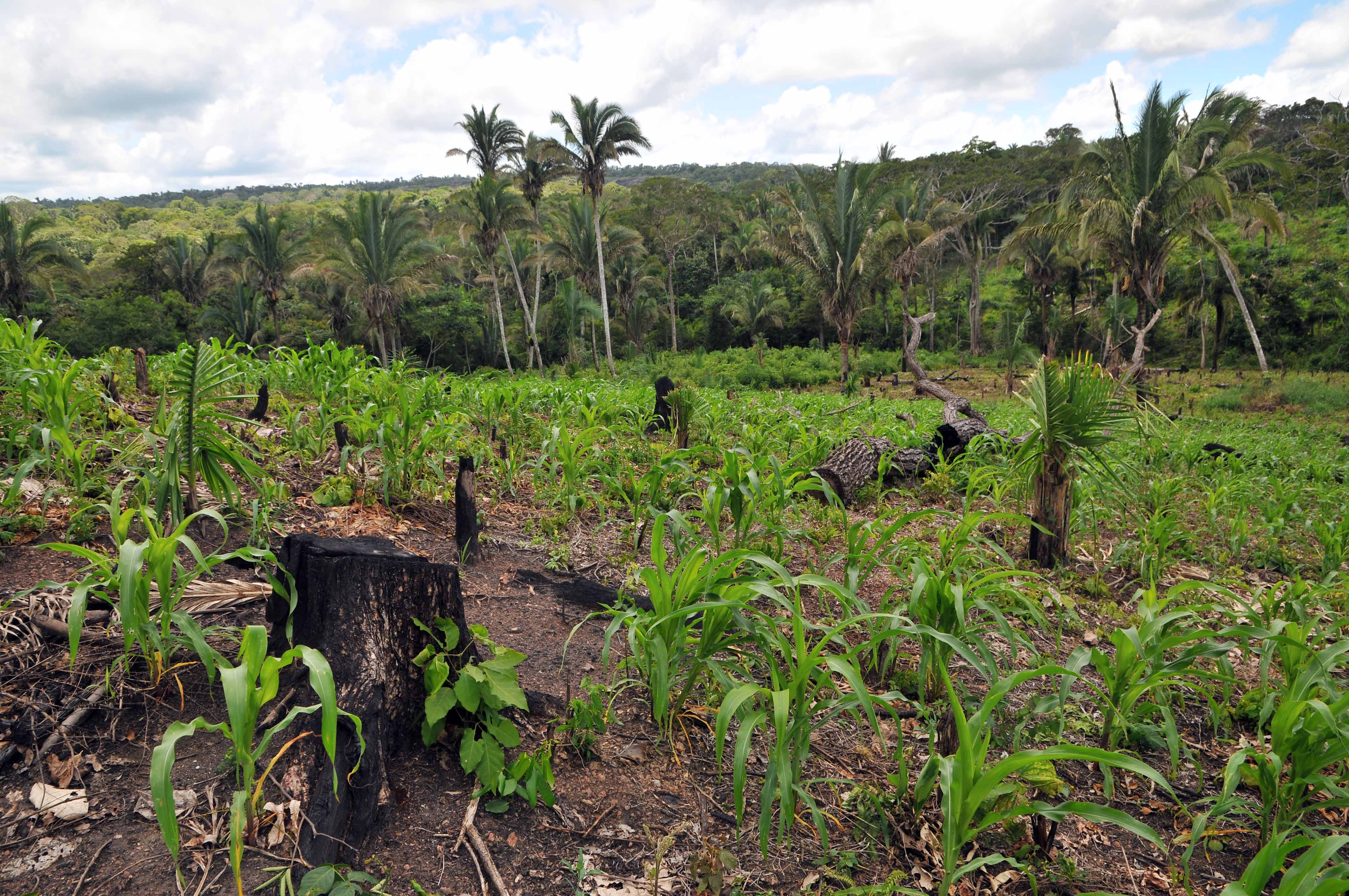
Santa Cruz, Bolivia

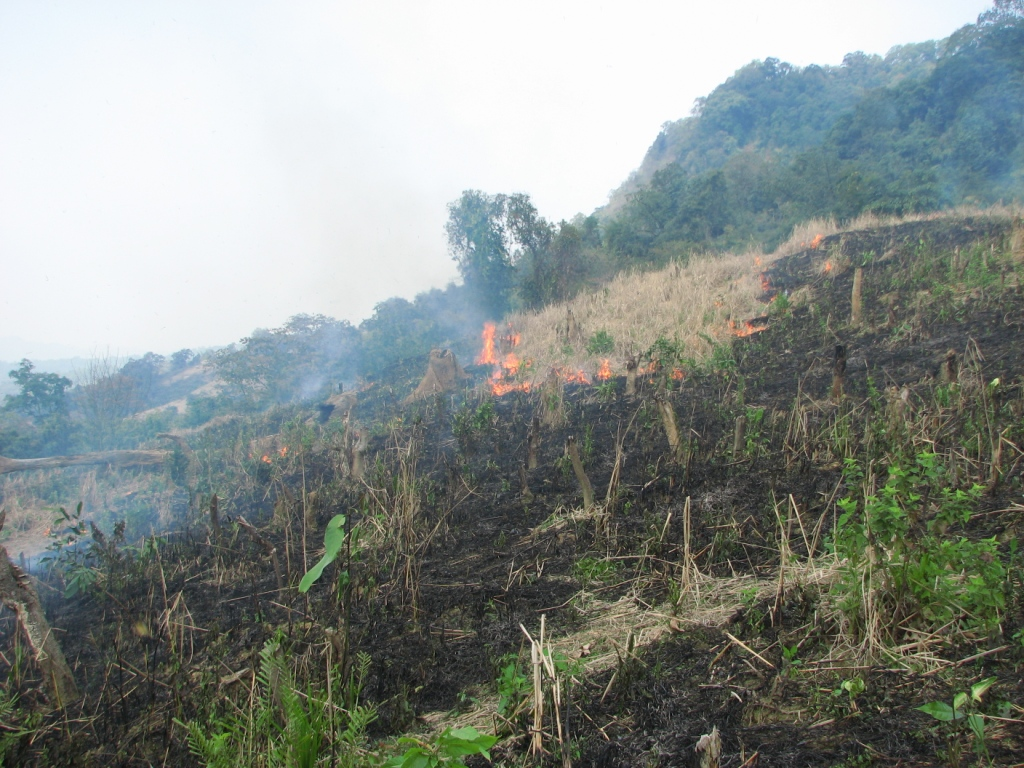
Arunachal Pradesh, India

== See also ==
- 2006 Southeast Asian haze
- 2013 Southeast Asian haze
- 2015 Southeast Asian haze
- 2019 Amazon rainforest wildfires
- History of the forest in Central Europe
- Agricultural waste

== General literature ==
- Conklin, H. C. (February 1961). "The Study of Shifting Cultivation" (PDF). Current Anthropology. 2 (1): 27–61. doi:10.1086/200160. JSTOR 2739597. S2CID 132297474. Archived from the original (PDF) on 2025-07-04.
- Nesholen, Birger (1994). "Svedjebrukerne", Østlandske Skogsområder, Den Norske Turistforening.
- Pyne, Stephen J. (1997). Vestal Fire: An Environmental History, Told Through Fire, of Europe and Europe's Encounter with the World. Seattle and London: University of Washington Press. ISBN 0-295-97596-2.
- Sawyer, Birgit; Sawyer, Peter H. (1993). Medieval Scandinavia: from Conversion to Reformation, Circa 800–1500. University of Minnesota Press. ISBN 0-8166-1739-2.
- Stagg, Frank Noel (1956). East Norway and Its Frontier. Allen & Unwin.
