= Finnsheep =

Finnish breed of sheep

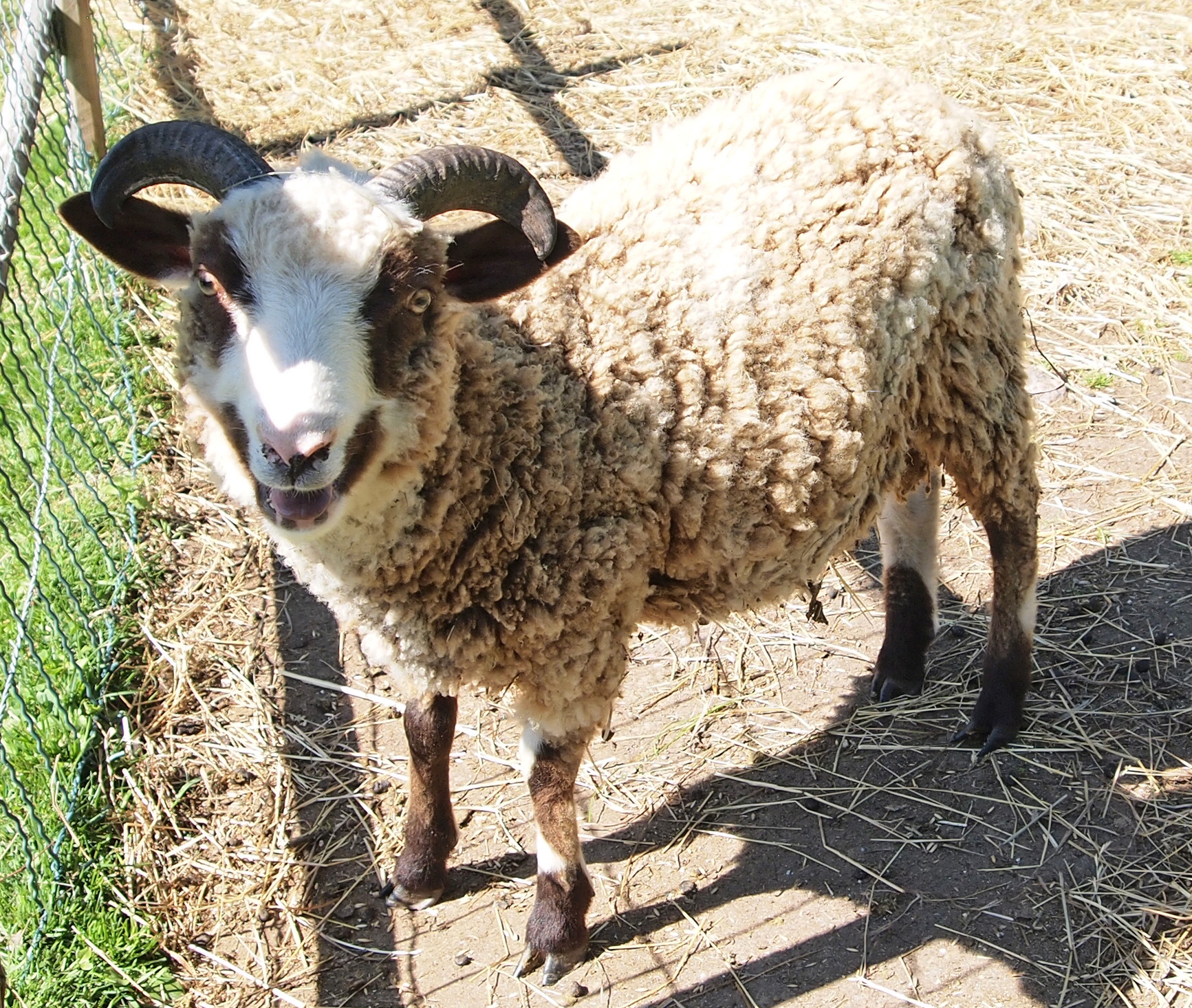

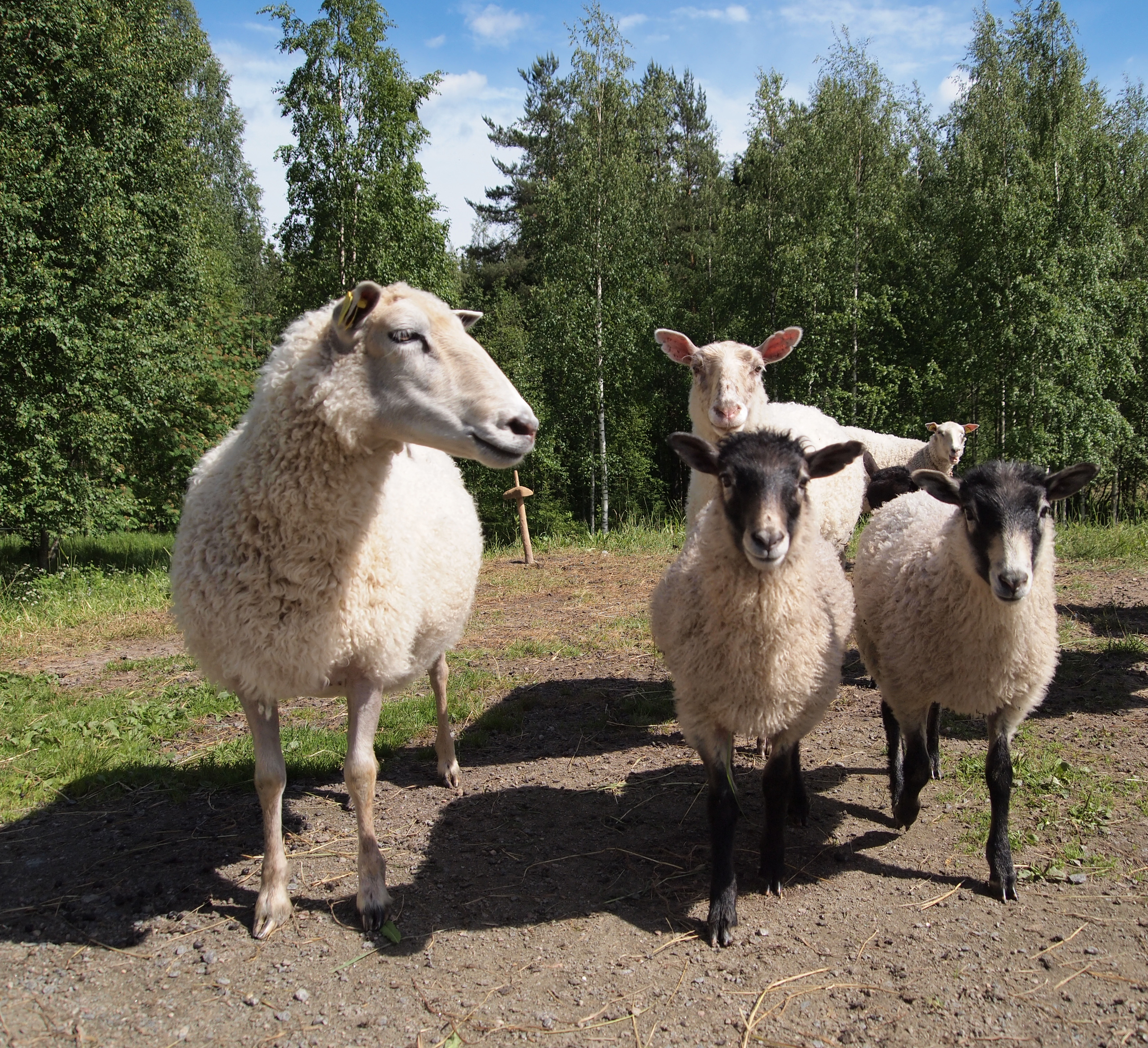
- Conservation status: FAO (2007): not at risk; DAD-IS (2026): not at risk
- Country of origin: Finland
- Distribution: Canada; Denmark; Netherlands; Norway; Uruguay
- Use: meat; wool; milk; conservation grazing

Traits
- Weight: Male: 100 kg; Female: 72 kg
- Height: Male: 79 cm; Female: 65 cm
- Wool colour: usually white; also black, brown or grey

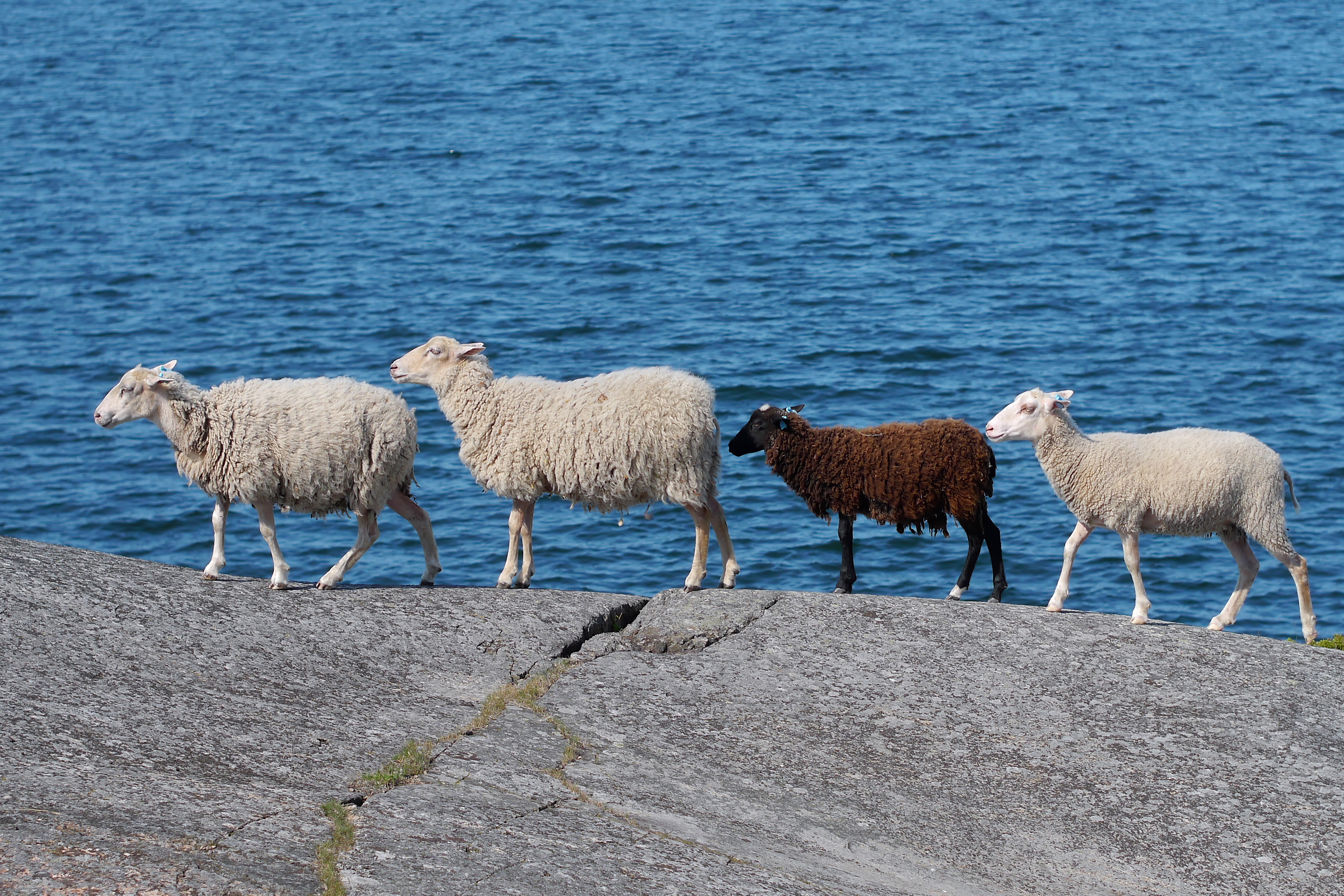
On the island of Konungsskär for conservation grazing

The Finnsheep or Suomenlammas is a Finnish breed of domestic sheep. It is one of the large Northern European short-tailed group of breeds. The lambs mature early and can be mated at six months of age. Ewes commonly breed out of season and some may lamb twice in a year.

== Characteristics ==
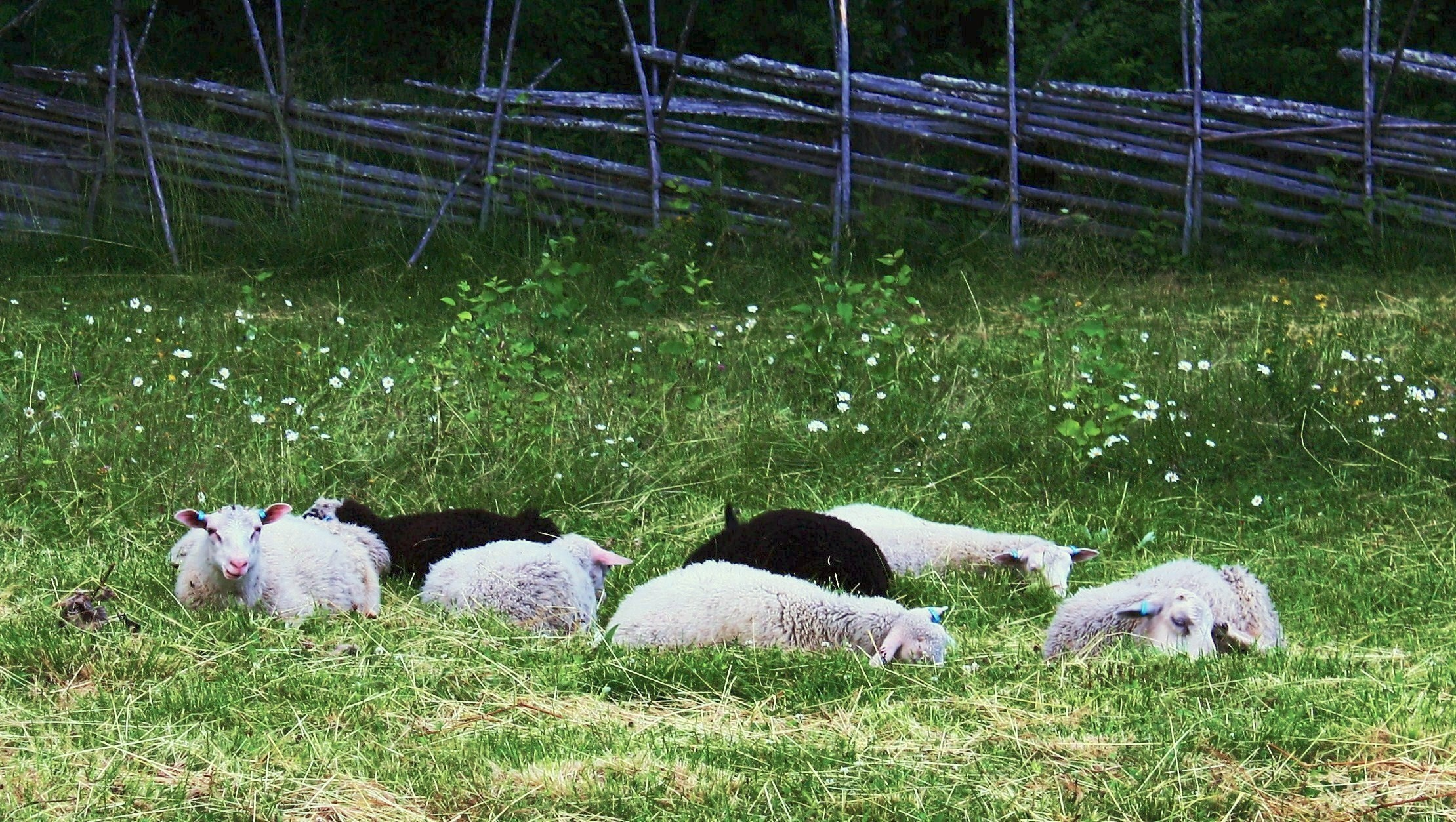
In Telkkämäki Nature Reserve

== Use ==
The fineness of Finnsheep wool has some individual variation, but the American Sheep Industry’s Wool Council ranks Finnsheep in the fine end of the medium wool category.

Although not a large sheep, Finns produce a lean, succulent meat with a delicate and mild flavor, even as adults.

=== Fertility ===
Finnsheep mature early and are known for their fertility. Rams can be bred at four to eight months of age, and ewes are expected to lamb at twelve months with multiple lambs. Although twins and triplets are most common, there have been litters born with as many as seven viable lambs.

== United States ==
Finnsheep were first brought to North America by the University of Manitoba, CA in 1966. A few years later, Finnsheep made their way down into the US by enthusiasts who hoped to improve maternal qualities in commercial flocks. By 1971, The Finnsheep Breeders Association had formed, providing shepherds with a standard of documentation to maintain and improve the integrity of the breed.
