= Juutila Foundry =

Finnish bell foundry

Juutila Foundry (Juutilan valimo)
- Type: General partnership
- Industry: Foundry
- Genre: Sand casting foundry
- Founded: 1881
- Founder: Mr Heikki Juutilainen
- Headquarters: Kaavi, Finland
- Key people: Mr Eljas Juutilainen (–2019)
- Products: Church bells, jingle bells, sleight bells, reliefs, grave crosses, family crests, business gifts
- Website: Juutila Foundry

Juutila Foundry Museum
- Established: 2004
- Location: Kaavi, Finland
- Coordinates: 63.071667°N 28.440278°E
- Website: Juutila Foundry Museum

Juutila Foundry is the oldest working bell foundry in Finland. Juutila foundry was founded in 1881.

Juutila Foundry (Juutilan valimo or Metallivalimo H & E Juutilainen in Finnish) is situated in the village of Vehkalahti in Kaavi, Northern Savonia.

Juutila Foundry Museum is in the old foundry building. It is a unique museum in the Nordic countries introducing the traditional sand casting method of the foundry.

== History ==
Juutila Foundry casts products out of bronze and brass. The foundry can make single pieces up to 500 kg (about 1100 lb).

The different kinds of bells and mortars and pestles were one of the main products in the early history of the foundry. The products of Juutila were originally sold as far as in Vyborg and Sortavala in Karelia. Some of the products found their way even to St. Petersburg.

In the 1940s the foundry made a large number of school bells. Five men were working in the foundry then. In the 1960s Juutila Foundry started to make church bells, which became the main products in the 1980s and 1990s. Nowadays Juutila Foundry manufactures about half a dozen church bells annually.

For its first hundred years the foundry operated in an old workshop. The new foundry building of brick was built in 1982.

=== Craftsmanship since 1881 ===
Mr Eljas Juutilainen (August 4, 1947 – March 6, 2019) carried on the tradition of his forebears by sand casting. The craft of casting and foundry work came to Juutila farm with Juutilainen's grandfather's uncle from nearby Juankoski ironworks. The history of Juutila Foundry dates back to 1881.

Mr Eljas Juutilainen was a third-generation craftsman. He worked at the foundry more than 40 years. Juutilainen was awarded Finnish State Award of Industrial Arts in 1975. The Finnish Chambers of Commerce has given him the Golden Medal of Merit. The Cross of Merit of the Order of the Lion of Finland was awarded him by the President of Finland.

== Products ==
Juutila Foundry makes many kinds of bells (church bells, jingle bells, sleigh bells), candlesticks, reliefs, grave crosses, business gifts, etc.

In the 21st century Juutila Foundry has also been casting the medallions of Cranbrook chairs (new production) designed by Eliel Saarinen.

== Commissions ==
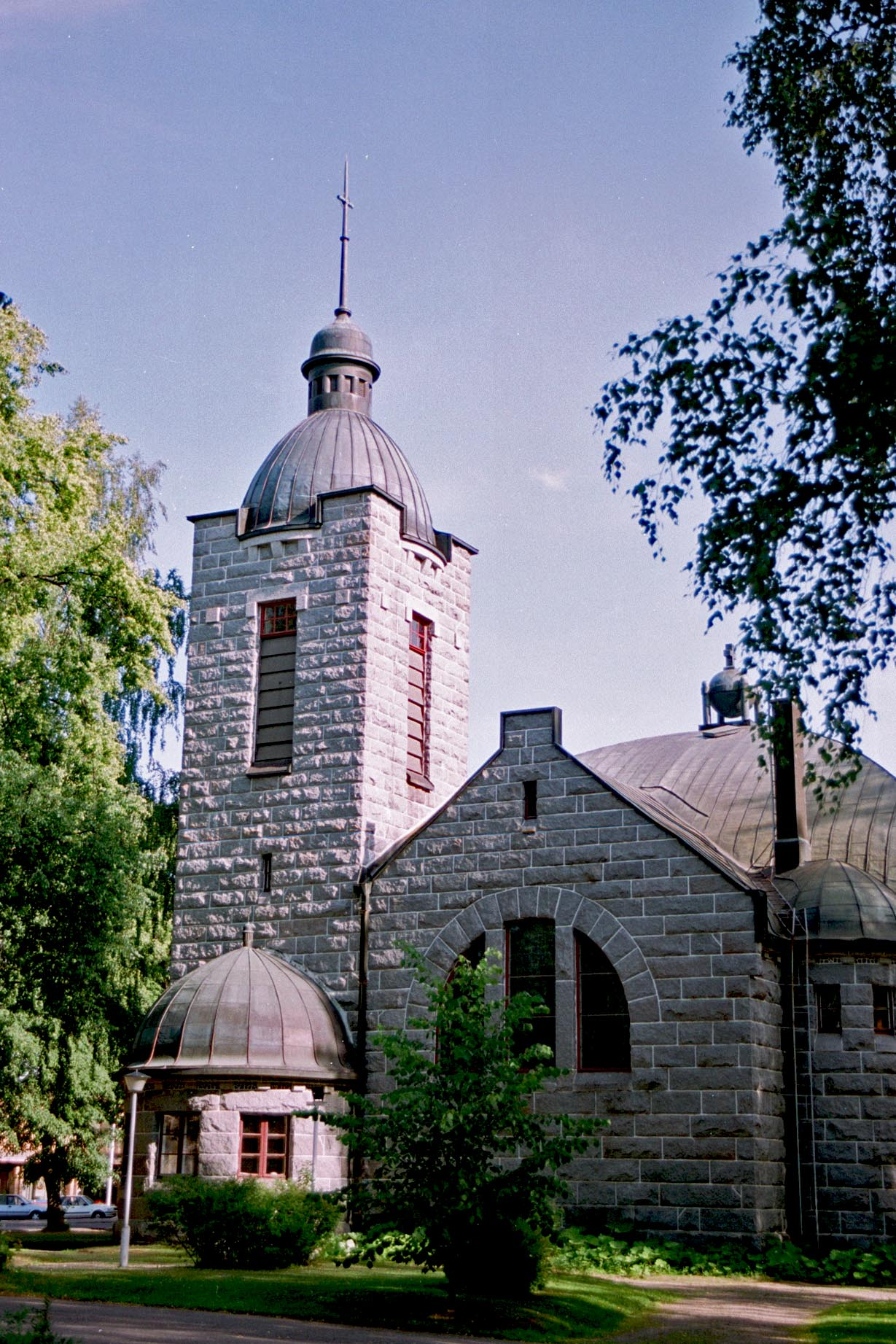
Hartola Church in Päijät-Häme

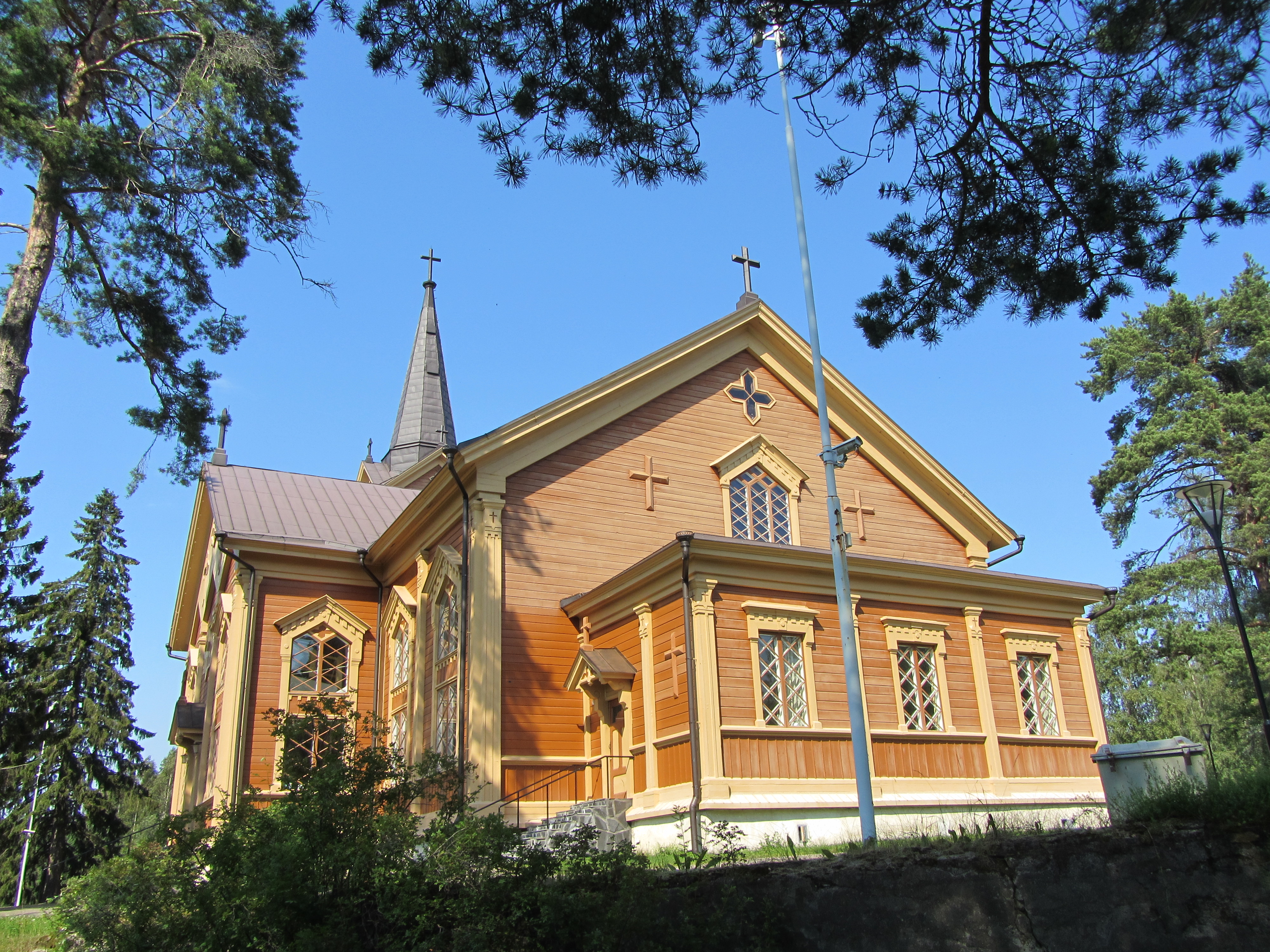
Kontiolahti Church in North Karelia

Juutila Foundry has manufactured church bells e.g. of these churches in Finland:

- Hanko
- Hartola, Hartola Church
- Iisalmi
- Kaavi, Luikonlahti Orthodox Chapel
- Kangasala, Sahalahti Church
- Kempele, Kempele Church
- Kiuruvesi, Lapinsalo Church
- Kontiolahti, Kontiolahti Church
- Kuopio, Church of the Resurrection of Christ (Ylösnousemuksen kirkko) in Juankoski
  - two brass bells (since 1990)
  - bigger bell: diameter about 77 cm (ca 30 inches), weight 265 kg (about 584 pounds), pitch B
  - smaller bell: diameter about 60 cm (ca 24 inches), weight 135 kg (about 298 pounds), pitch D
- Kuopio, Juankoski Orthodox Church
- Kuopio, Murtolahti Chapel in Nilsiä
  - brass bell (since 2005)
  - diameter about 41 cm (about 16 inches)
- Lahti, Mukkula Parish Centre
- Lapinlahti, Alapitkä Church
- Lappeenranta, Orthodox church of Lappeenranta
  - bronze bell, weight 180 kg
- Nivala, Karvoskylä Chapel
- Nokia, Pinsiö Church
- Pyhäjoki, Pyhäjoki Church
- Pyhäjärvi, Pyhäjärvi Church
- Ristijärvi, Ristijärvi Church
  - since 2007
  - weight 160 kg
- Savonlinna, Haukiniemi Orthodox Chapel
  - three bells
  - largest bronze bell weight 40 kg
- Utsjoki, Nuorgam

The Venehjärvi Orthodox Chapel in Republic of Karelia, Russia, and a church in Koltuši (Колтуши), Russia, have bells from Juutila Foundry. Juutila bells have also been exported to Australia, Bolivia, Kenya, Namibia, Senegal, Tanzania, and Uruguay.

== Juutila Foundry Museum ==
At the beginning of the new millennium they decided to establish a foundry museum to preserve the foundry's history. With the expertise of the Finnish National Board of Antiquities the items of the old foundry were counted. They listed almost 2,000 objects from the foundry.

The old foundry got a new location in the other side of the yard, and it became a museum introducing especially the traditional sand casting method of the foundry.

Juutila Foundry Museum was opened in 2004. It is open in summer.

== See also ==
- Photo: Moving old foundry to new location (building Foundry Museum)
- Photo: Juutila's horse bell, diameter 10,7 cm (about 4 inches), from Museum of Lieksa (Pielisen museo)
