= Miina Äkkijyrkkä =

Finnish artist (born 1949)

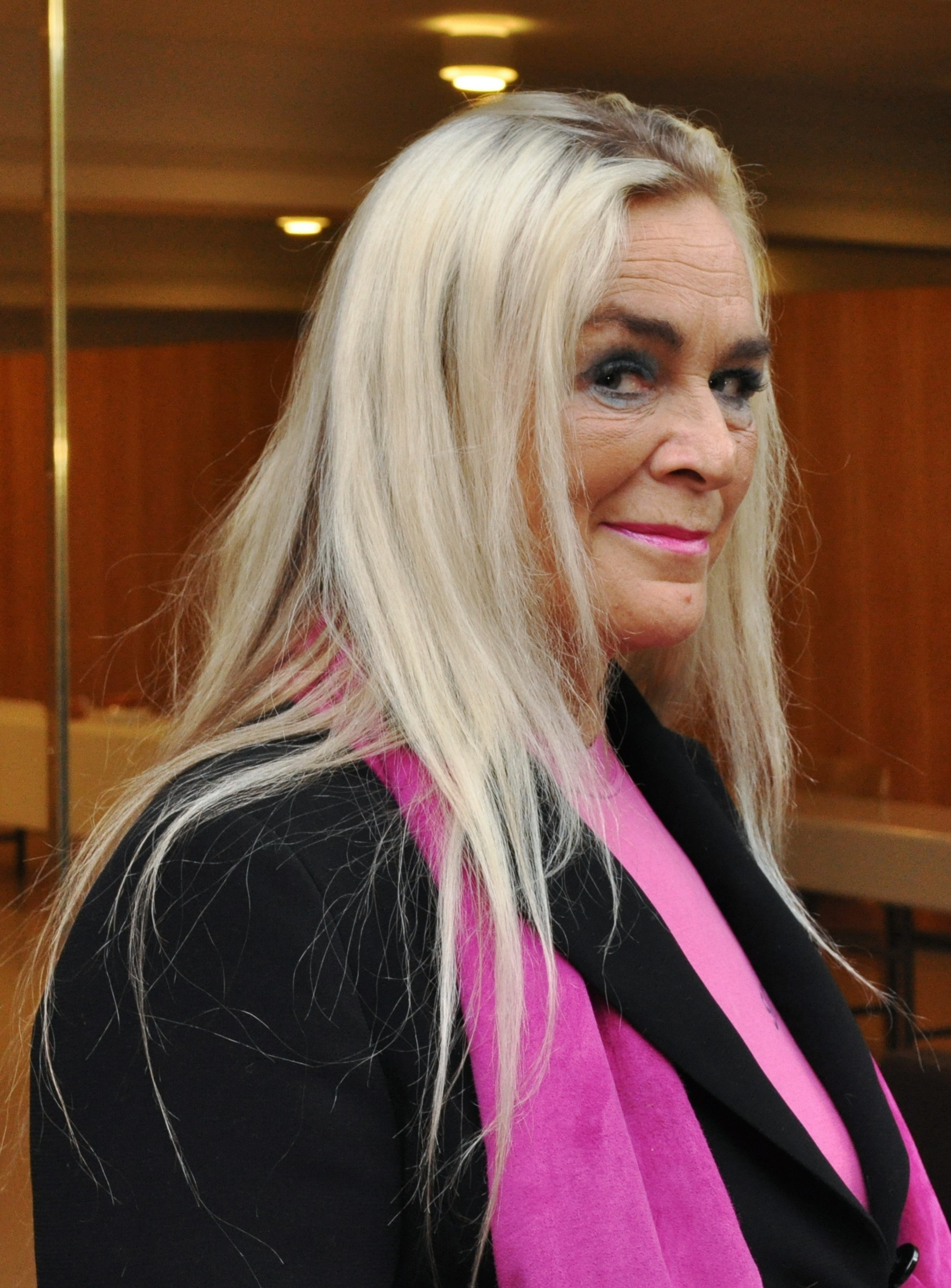
- Miina Äkkijyrkkä in February 2009
- Born: Riitta Loiva; 2 July 1949 (age 77); Iisalmi, Finland

Miina Äkkijyrkkä (born Riitta Loiva; 2 July 1949 in Iisalmi, Finland), also known as Liina Lång, is a Finnish artist. She is known for her paintings, drawings and sculptures. She is also a protector of Finncattle, the native Finnish dairy breed. She is known for her disdain for mainstream culture, and her actions have aroused controversy.

== Personal life ==
Äkkijyrkkä has three children. She stated in 2008 and 2009 that she is on the autism spectrum.
