= Western Finncattle =

Breed of cattle

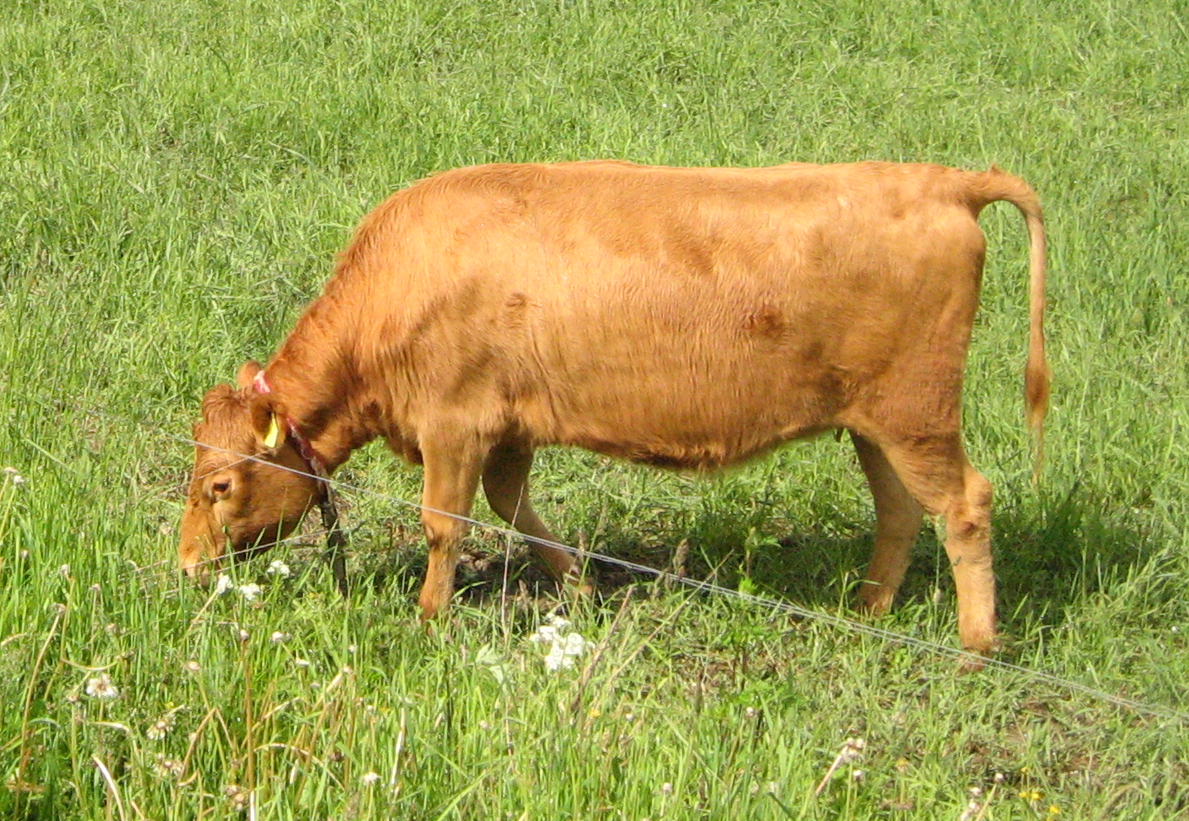
Finnish native cattle grazing on a field in Tampere. Western Finnish heifer.

Western Finncattle are a breed of cattle from western Finland. They are a dual purpose breed, used in dairy and beef production. These cattle are usually red and polled (hornless).

Cows produce approximately 6100 kg of milk with 4.4% fat and 3.5% protein.
