= Ville Niskanen =

Finnish diplomat

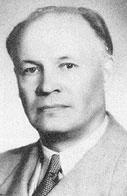
Ville Niskanen.

Ville Niskanen (9 August 1887 – 1970) was a Finnish diplomat.

Niskanen was born in Maaninka. His parents were farmer Paavo Niskanen and Hedvig Rönkä. He graduated in 1907 and later studied languages in London in 1924 and in Paris in 1927–1928.

Niskanen was Secretary of the Young Finnish Party from 1911 to 1914, President of the Vigilant Commitment Board of the Vyborg Provincial in 1917-1919 and acted as businessman in 1919–1921. He has been employed by the Foreign Service since 1921 at various diplomatic missions in Tallinn, London, Hamburg, Berlin, Shanghai, Cape Town, New York, Belgrade and Sofia. Niskanen was an envoy for Yugoslavia from 1948 to 1953. He served in the Ministry of Foreign Affairs from 1942 to 1945 and again since 1953.

Ville Niskanen was married in 1912–1916 with Hulda Kuusamo (née Klingsten) and since 1918 with Helmi Blasnialis.
