= Hugo Niskanen =

Finnish long-distance runner

Hugo Olavi Niskanen (8 September 1920 – 4 December 2014) was a Finnish former long-distance runner who competed in the 1952 Summer Olympics. He was born in Kaavi.

Niskanen died in Outokumpu at age 94.
