= Northern Finncattle =

Breed of cattle

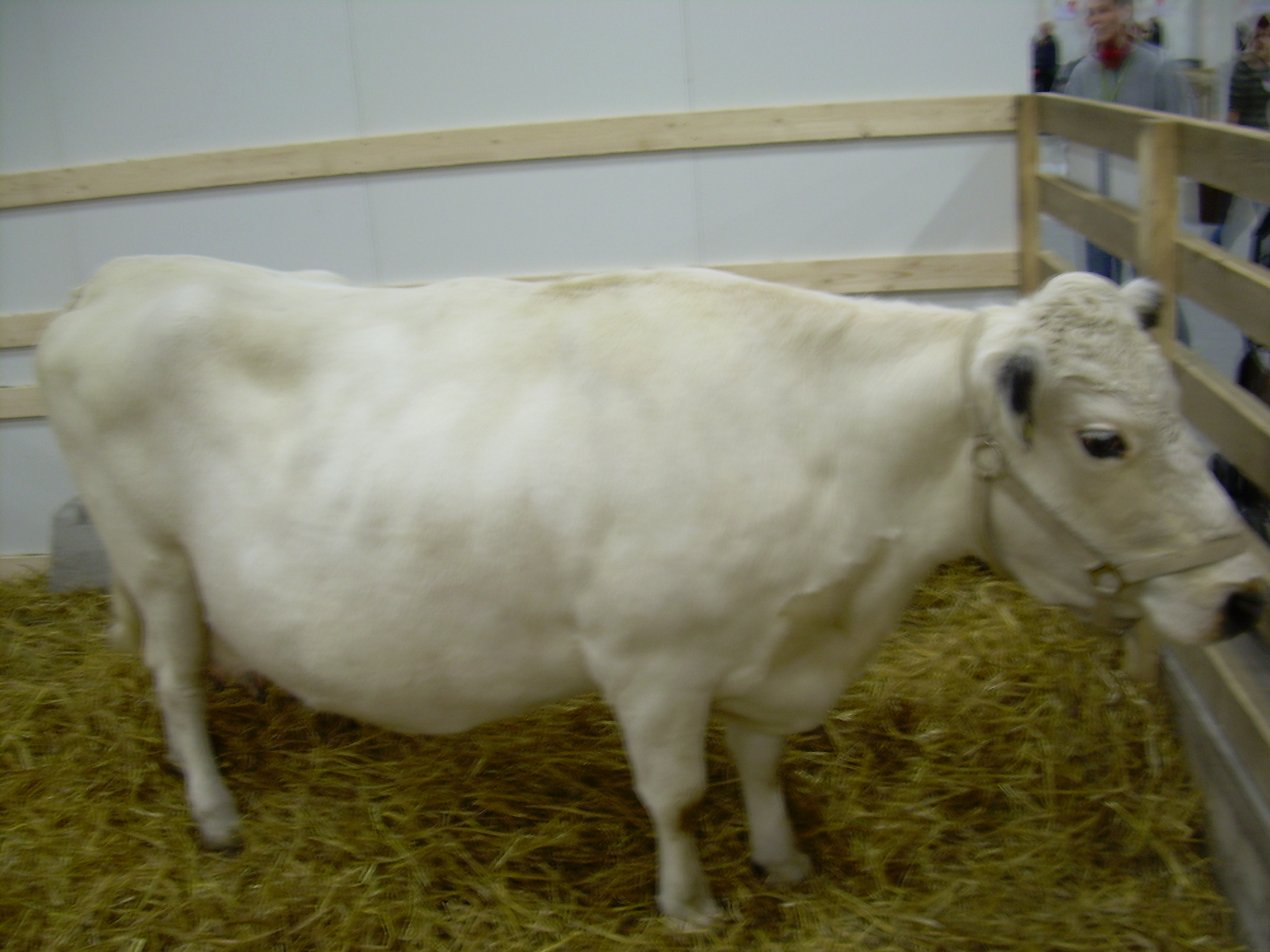
Northern Finncattle

Northern Finncattle are a dual breed of cattle from Finland, used in both dairy and beef production. These cattle are usually white with pigmented ears and muzzle, and naturally polled.

Cows produce approximately 4000 kg of milk per lactation.

== Breed conservation ==
Herds of Northern are kept at prison farms at Pelso and Sukeva. Private farms are given conservation grants to keep Finncattle. The Nordic Gene Bank for Farm Animals (NGH), founded in 1984, co-ordinates the conservation of Nordic rare breeds. Genetic studies show common ancestry with Icelandic cattle, Swedish Mountain cattle and Western Fjord cattle. These breeds produce a quality of milk protein well suited to manufacturing.
