= Eastern Finncattle =

Breed of cattle

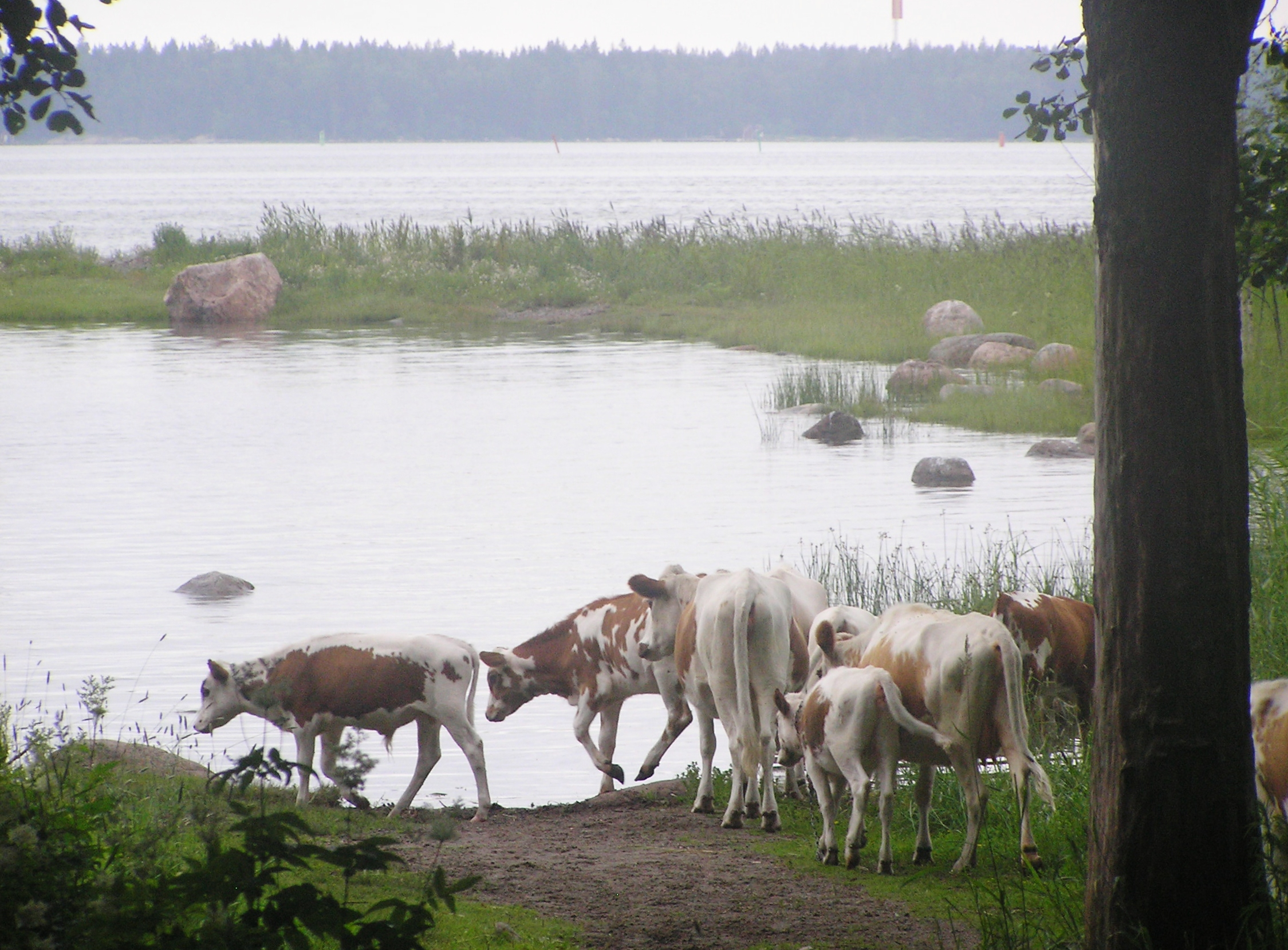
Eastern Finncattle cows with youngstock.

Eastern Finncattle (Finnish: itäsuomenkarja or kyyttö, pronounced [ˈitæˌsuo̯menˌkɑrja] and [ˈkyːtːø]) are a breed of cattle from eastern Finland. They are a dual purpose breed, used in dairy and beef production.

Cows produce approximately 4100 kg of milk per lactation, with about 4.4% fat and 3.5% protein.

The Eastern Finncattle cows were recognized as a separate breed in the 1890s. There was a need to improve milk production and the recognition of breeds was part of the development work. The general interest in well characterized breeds coincided with strong nationalistic feelings at the time.
