= Kaavi =

- Municipality
- Kaavin kunta Kaavi kommun
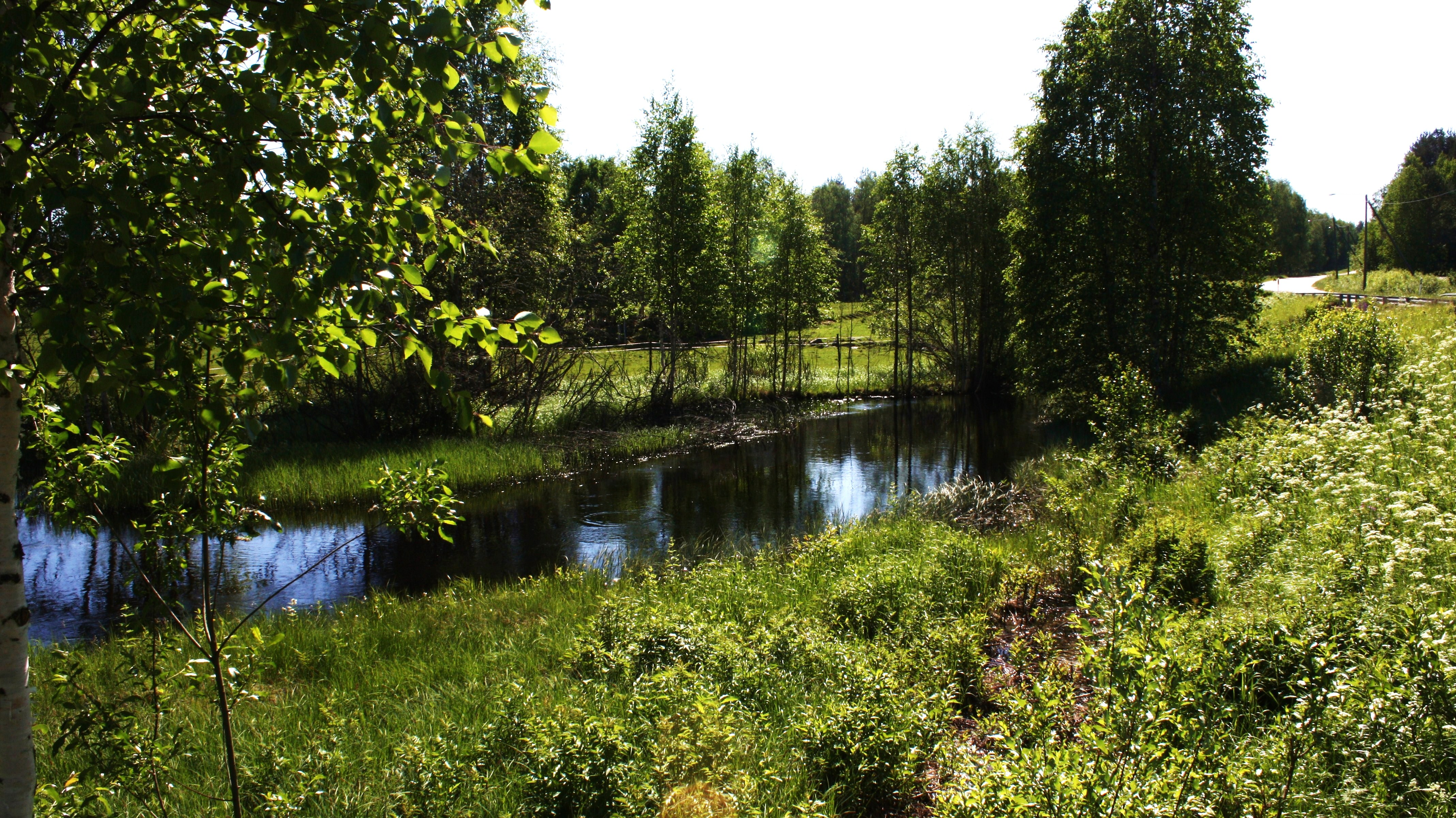
- Sivakkajoki River flows through Kaavi.

- Coat of arms

- Location of Kaavi in Finland
- Interactive map of Kaavi
- Coordinates: 62°58.5′N 028°29′E
- Country: Finland
- Region: North Savo
- Sub-region: Northeast Savo
- Charter: 1875

Government
  - Municipal manager: Harri Korhonen

Area (2018-01-01)
  - Total: 789.59 km^{2} (304.86 sq mi)
  - Land: 674.08 km^{2} (260.26 sq mi)
  - Water: 115.49 km^{2} (44.59 sq mi)
  - Rank: 126th largest in Finland

Population (2025-12-31)
  - Total: 2,547
  - Rank: 230th largest in Finland
  - Density: 3.78/km^{2} (9.8/sq mi)

Population by native language
  - Finnish: 97.6% (official)
  - Others: 2.4%

Population by age
  - 0 to 14: 11.1%
  - 15 to 64: 53.2%
  - 65 or older: 35.7%
- Time zone: UTC+02:00 (EET)
  - Summer (DST): UTC+03:00 (EEST)
- Website: kaavi.fi

Kaavi is a municipality of Finland. It is located in the North Savo region. Kaavi is also a part of historical Karelia. The municipality has a population of 2,547 (31 December 2025) and covers an area of 789.59 square kilometres (304.86 sq mi) of which 115.49 km^{2} (44.59 sq mi) is water. The population density is 3.78 inhabitants per square kilometre (9.8/sq mi). It is 60 kilometres (37 mi) from Kuopio and 90 kilometres (56 mi) from Joensuu. Neighbouring municipalities are Kuopio, Juuka, Outokumpu, Polvijärvi and Tuusniemi.

The municipality is unilingually Finnish.

== Sights and activities ==
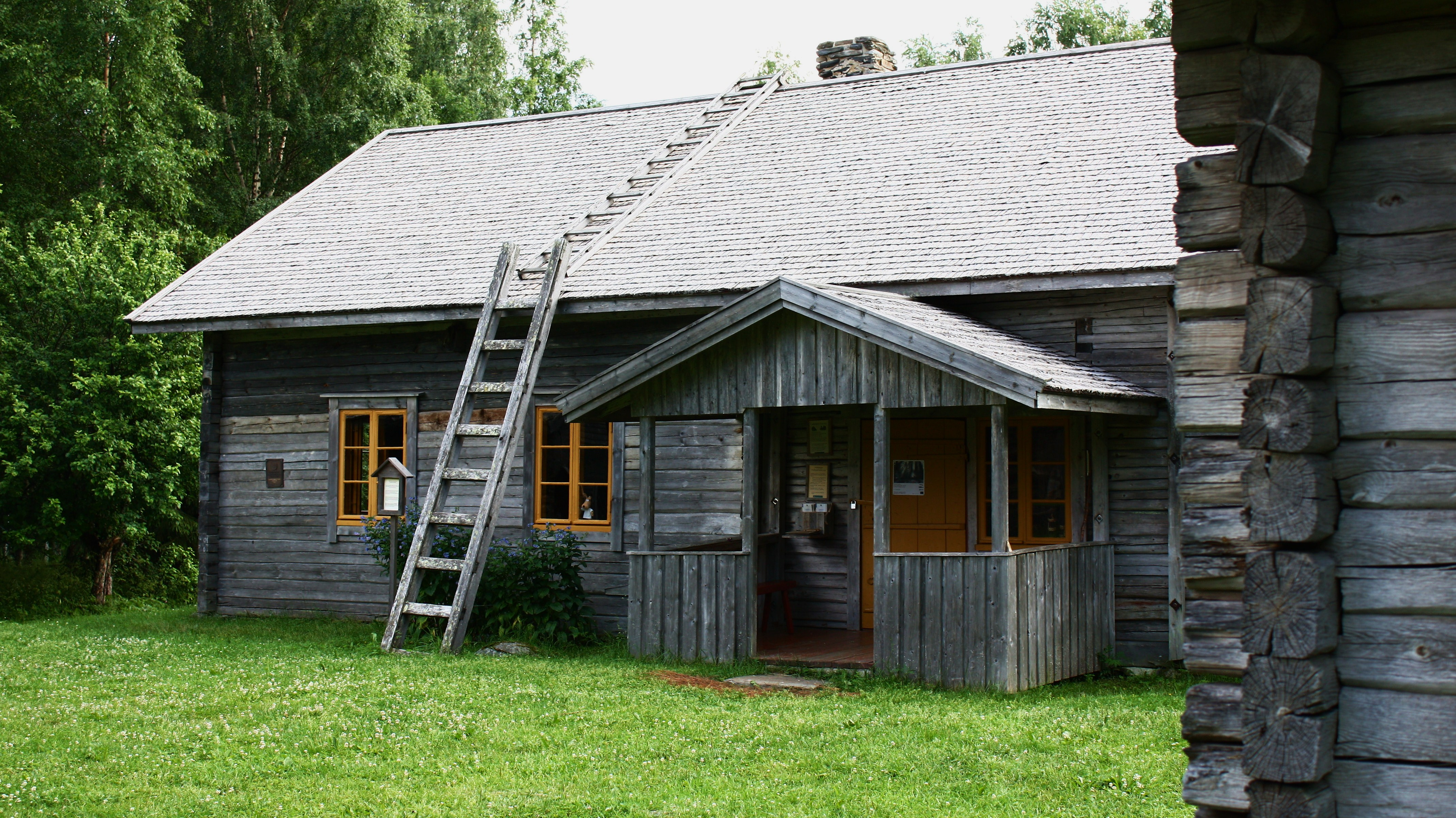
Telkkämäki Heritage Farm.

- Telkkämäki Nature Reserve (Heritage Farm)
- Juutila Foundry Museum (the only sand casting museum in the Nordic countries, foundry since 1881)
- Vaikkojoki River; shooting the rapids, fishing, hiking, canoeing
- Kaavi Blues Festival in June
- Summer theaters in Luikonlahti and Maarianvaara
- Kaavi Church
- Orthodox Chapel in Luikonlahti

== Twin towns ==
- Mõniste, Estonia
- Võru County, Estonia

== Notable people ==
- Harri Hakkarainen, javelin thrower
- Isto Hiltunen, musician
- Matti Koivunen, ice hockey player
- Seppo Kononen, journalist, had award 2011 (Suomen kuvalehti)
- Hugo Niskanen, runner
- Mira Salo, Miss Finland
