= Nerkoonjärvi =

Nerkoonjärvi may refer to:

- Nerkoonjärvi (Iisalmi), a lake in Finland
- Nerkoonjärvi (Kihniö), a lake in Finland
