= Petsamo =

Petsamo may refer to:

- Petsamo Province, a province of Finland from 1921 to 1922
- Petsamo, Tampere, a district in Tampere, Finland
- Pechengsky District, Russia, formerly known as Petsamo
- Pechenga (urban-type settlement), Murmansk Oblast, Russia, formerly known as Petsamo
