= Nuotio =

Surname list

Nuotio is a surname. Notable people with the surname include:

- Eppu Nuotio (born 1962), Finnish actress and author
- Paavo Nuotio (1901–1968), Finnish ski jumper
