= Lapinniemi =

City district in Tampere, Finland

Coordinates: 61°30′40.80395″N 23°46′19.59510″E

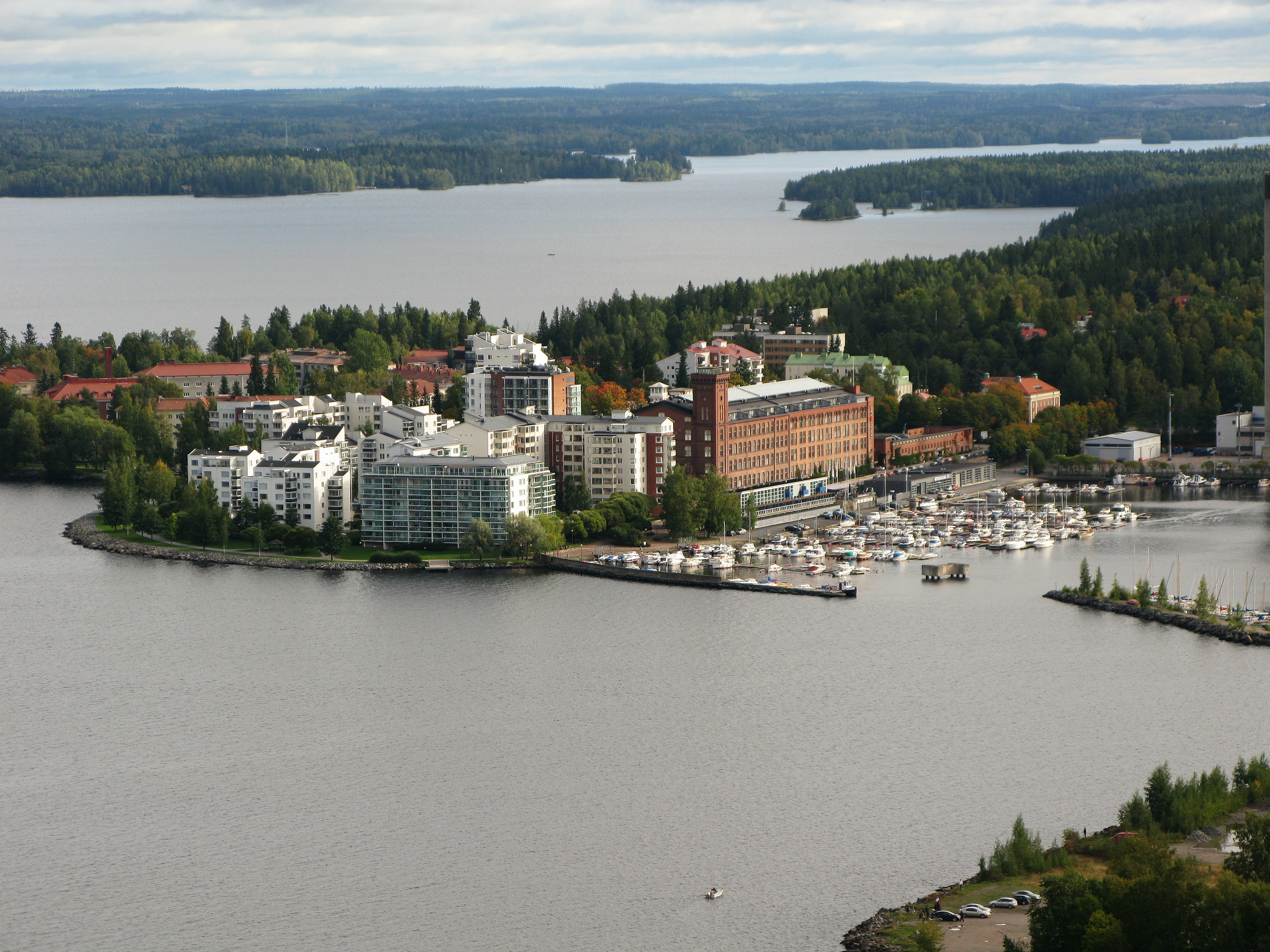
Lapinniemi as seen from Näsinneula

Lapinniemi (Finnish pronunciation: [ˈlɑpinˌnːie̯mi]) is a district in the northern part of Tampere, Finland. It is located on a peninsula formed on the shores of Lake Näsijärvi. Neighboring parts of the city are Petsamo, Lappi and Tampella. It is about a kilometer from the city center of Tampere to Lapinniemi, but it takes about five minutes by bus through Tammela and 10 minutes to the Central Square.

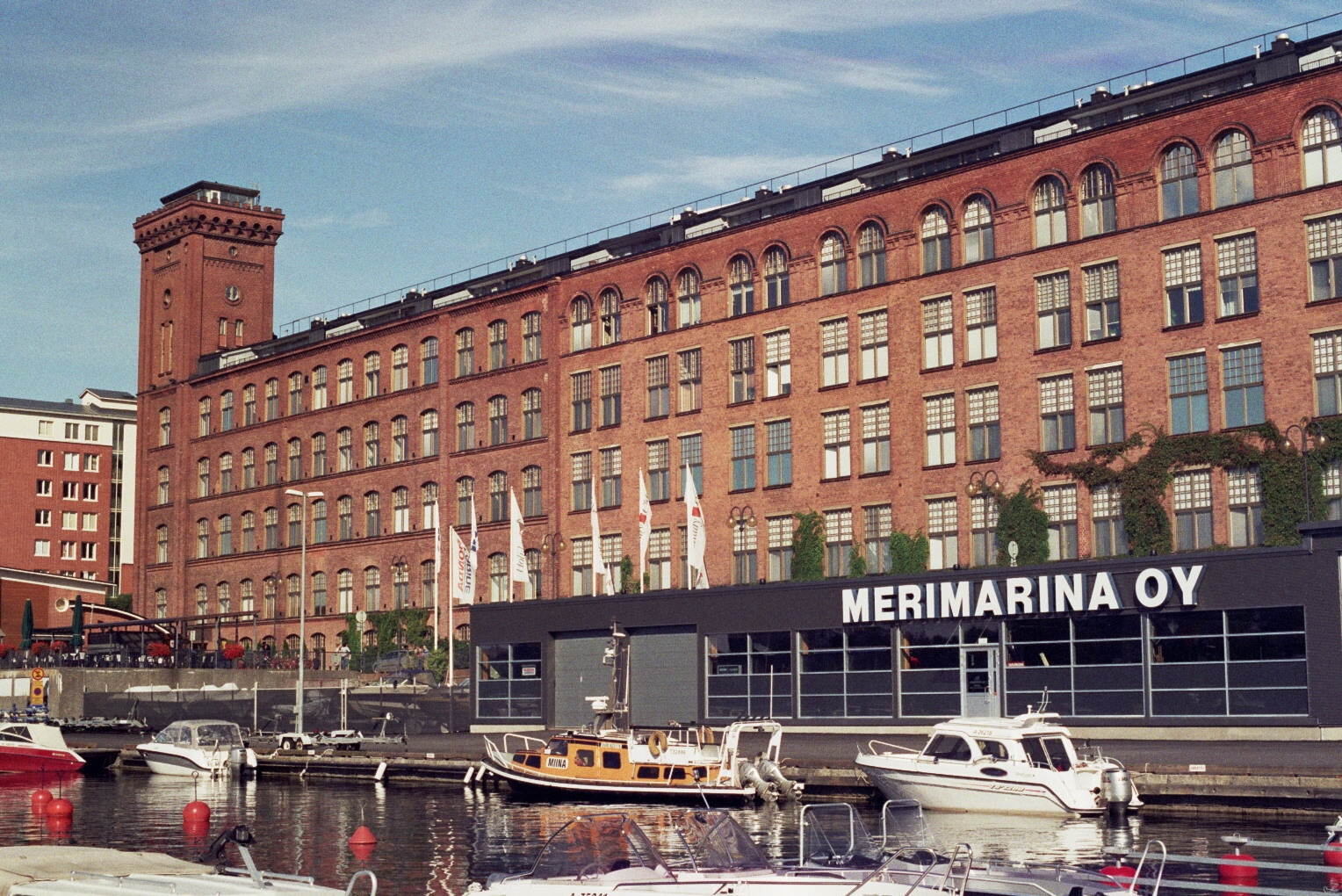
Holiday Club Tampere

The cotton mill of Tampereen Puuvillateollisuus Oy, which manufactured fabrics and yarns, was completed in the Lapinniemi area in 1899 and was integrated into Tampella in 1934. The mill was in operation until the mid-1980s. In Lapinniemi, there is the Rauhaniemi folk spa, the Holiday Club Tampere spa (built in an old cotton factory), and the Koukkuniemi's retirement home. Lapinniemi operated as a housing fair in 1990.

== See also ==
- Lappi, Tampere

== Sources ==
- Maija Louhivaara: Tampereen kadunnimet. Tampereen museoiden julkaisuja 51, 1999, Tampere. ISBN 951-609-105-9. (in Finnish)
