= Osmonmäki =

City district in Tampere, Finland

Coordinates: 61°30′22″N 23°46′43″E

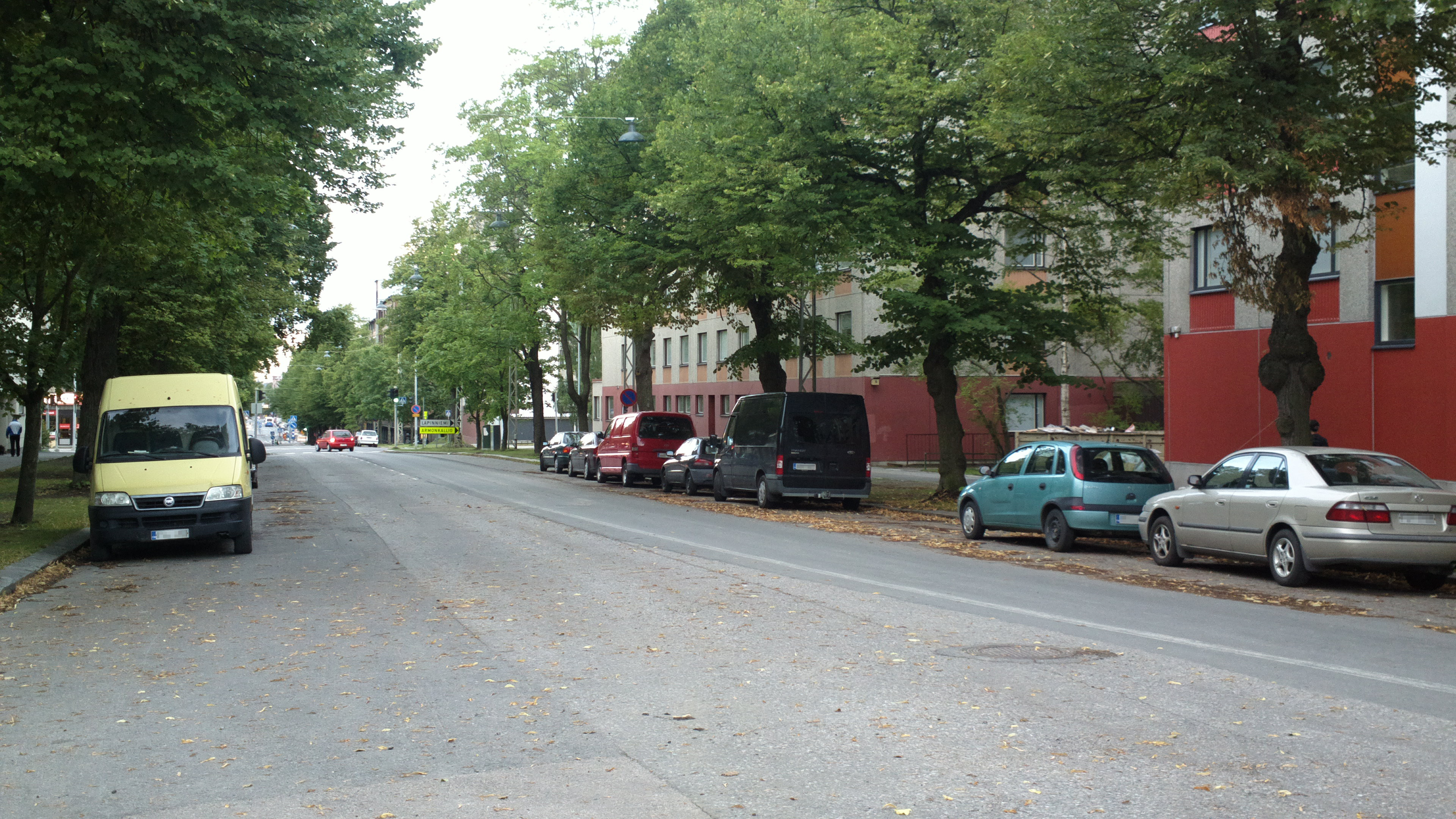
Tammelan puistokatu street in Osmonmäki

Osmonmäki is a district in the center of Tampere, Finland. The immediate neighbors of the area are Tammela, Tampella, Lappi and Petsamo. There are apartment buildings in the area, but also hundred-year-old wooden buildings. In 2011, the district had 1,613 inhabitants.

== History ==
Construction of the northern part of Tammela, called Osmonmäki, began in the 1890s as a result of the renovation of Kyttälä. In the second half of the 1910s, a suburb of Lappi was built on the north side of the district, to which people traveled along the Lapintie street. Lapintie, which crossed the railway through the Kastinsilta bridge, was also a route from Osmonmäki to the city center.
