= Lapinlahti =

- Municipality
- Lapinlahden kunta Lapinlahti kommun
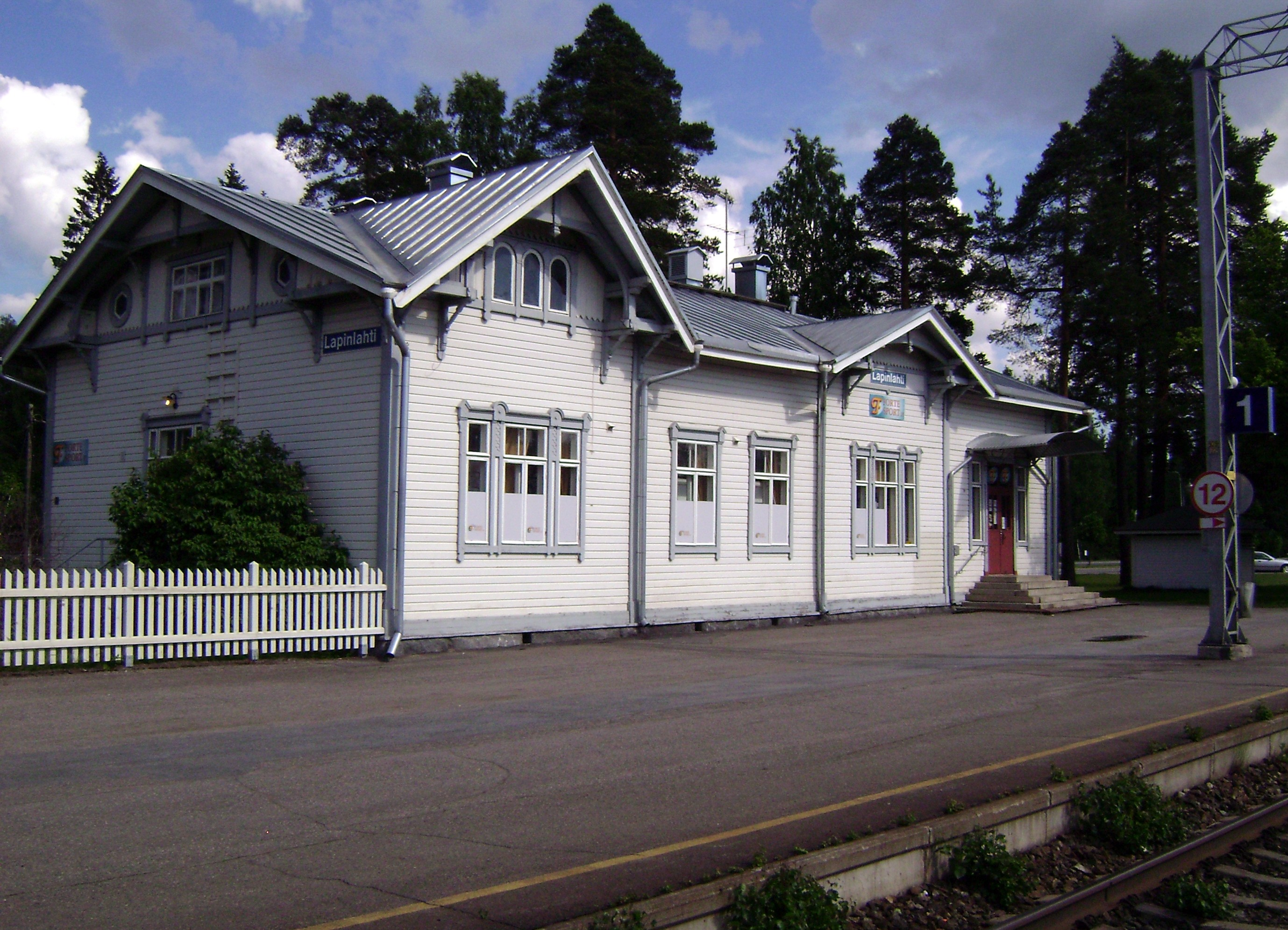
- Lapinlahti railway station

- Coat of arms

- Location of Lapinlahti in Finland
- Interactive map of Lapinlahti
- Coordinates: 63°22′N 027°23′E
- Country: Finland
- Region: Northern Savo
- Sub-region: Upper Savonia
- Charter: 1874

Government
  - Municipal manager: Heikki Airaksinen

Area (2018-01-01)
  - Total: 1,245.16 km^{2} (480.76 sq mi)
  - Land: 1,096.71 km^{2} (423.44 sq mi)
  - Water: 148.58 km^{2} (57.37 sq mi)
  - Rank: 70th largest in Finland

Population (2025-12-31)
  - Total: 8,803
  - Rank: 110th largest in Finland
  - Density: 8.03/km^{2} (20.8/sq mi)

Population by native language
  - Finnish: 96.6% (official)
  - Swedish: 0.1%
  - Others: 3.3%

Population by age
  - 0 to 14: 14.8%
  - 15 to 64: 56.7%
  - 65 or older: 28.5%
- Time zone: UTC+02:00 (EET)
  - Summer (DST): UTC+03:00 (EEST)
- Website: www.lapinlahti.fi

Lapinlahti (Finnish: [ˈlɑpinˌlɑhti]; Swedish: Lapinlahti, also Lapinlax) is a municipality of Finland. It is part of the Northern Savo region, located 59 kilometres (37 mi) north of the city of Kuopio. The municipality has a population of 8,803 (31 December 2025) and covers an area of 1,245.16 square kilometres (480.76 sq mi) of which 148.58 km^{2} (57.37 sq mi) is water. The population density is 8.03 inhabitants per square kilometre (20.8/sq mi). The municipality is unilingually Finnish.

The neighboring municipalities of Lapinlahti are Iisalmi, Kuopio, Rautavaara, Siilinjärvi and Sonkajärvi. The neighboring municipality of Varpaisjärvi was consolidated with Lapinlahti on 1 January 2011.

There are a total of 229 lakes in the municipality of Lapinlahti, the largest of which include Lake Onkivesi.
