= Lake Haapajärvi =

Lake

- Location within Finland
- Coordinates: 63°34′32″N 26°58′00″E
- Basin countries: Finland
- Max. depth: 8.5 metres (28 ft)
- Shore length^{1}: 87.22 kilometres (54.20 mi)
- Surface elevation: 85.9 metres (282 ft)
- ^{1} Shore length is not a well-defined measure.

Lake Haapajärvi is a middle size lake in the area of Iisalmi, Northern Savonia, Finland. There are 38 lakes with the name Haapajärvi in Finland, with this particular lake being the largest in size.

== See also ==
- List of lakes in Finland
