= Nerkoonjärvi (Iisalmi) =

Lake of Northern Savonia region, Finland

- Location within Finland
- Coordinates: 63°27.5′N 027°17′E
- Lake type: Natural
- Primary inflows: Peltosalmi
- Primary outflows: Nerohvirta
- Catchment area: Vuoksi
- Basin countries: Finland
- Surface area: 15.664 km^{2} (6.048 sq mi)
- Average depth: 3.06 m (10.0 ft)
- Max. depth: 11.97 m (39.3 ft)
- Water volume: 0.048 km^{3} (0.012 cu mi)
- Shore length^{1}: 66.08 km (41.06 mi)
- Surface elevation: 85.8 m (281 ft)
- Frozen: December–April
- Islands: Luhtasaari, Heiskalansaari, Aittosaari
- Settlements: Iisalmi, Lapinlahti
- ^{1} Shore length is not a well-defined measure.

Nerkoonjärvi is a medium-sized lake in the Vuoksi main catchment area. It is located in Iisalmi and Lapinlahti, in Northern Savonia region, Finland.

== See also ==
- List of lakes in Finland
