= Porovesi =

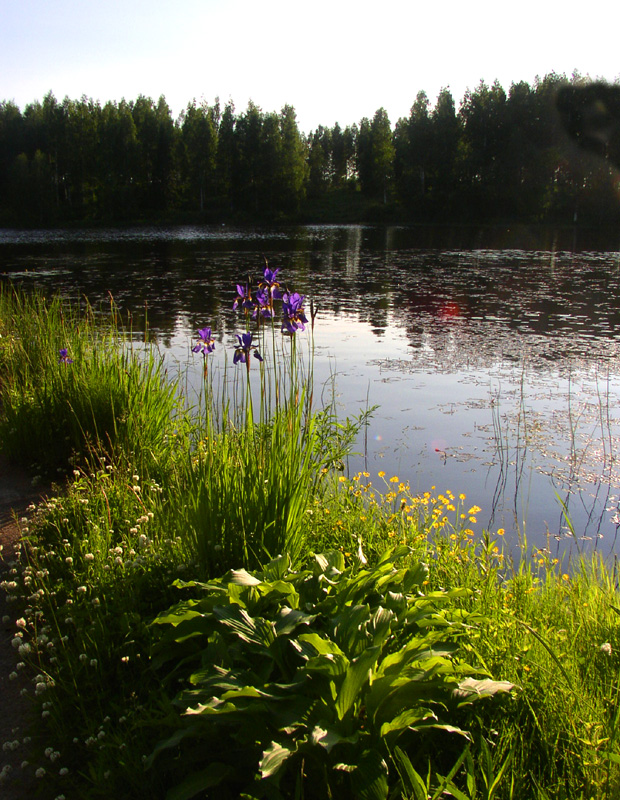
- By the lake Porovesi in iisalmi, Finland

- Location within Finland
- Coordinates: 63°33′N 027°10′E
- Type: Lake
- Primary inflows: Koljonvirta
- Catchment area: Vuoksi
- Basin countries: Finland
- Surface area: 22.115 km^{2} (8.539 sq mi)
- Average depth: 5.41 m (17.7 ft)
- Max. depth: 24.97 m (81.9 ft)
- Water volume: 0.12 km^{3} (97,000 acre⋅ft)
- Shore length^{1}: 61.51 km (38.22 mi)
- Surface elevation: 85.88 m (281.8 ft)
- Frozen: December–April
- Islands: Kumpusaari, Haukisaari
- Settlements: Iisalmi
- ^{1} Shore length is not a well-defined measure.

Porovesi is a medium-sized lake in the Vuoksi main catchment area. It is located in the Iisalmi town, North Savo region in Finland.

== See also ==
- List of lakes in Finland
