= Iisalmi =

Iisalmi Idensalmi
- Town
- Iisalmen kaupunki Idensalmi stad
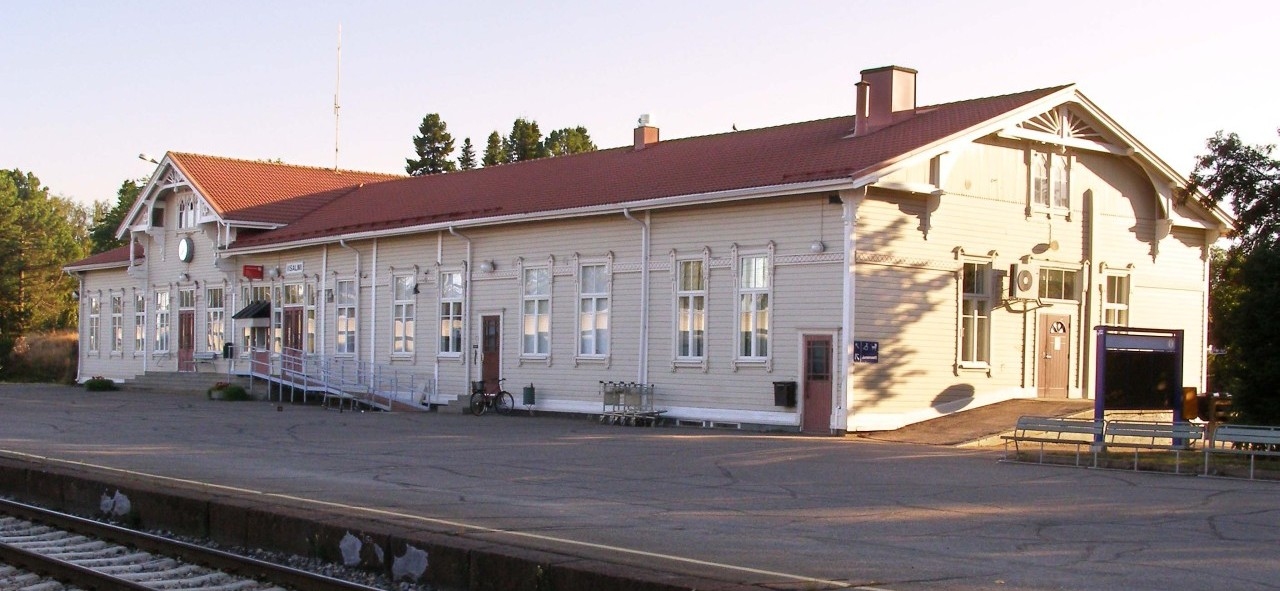
- Iisalmi railway station

- Flag Coat of arms

- Location of Iisalmi in Finland
- Interactive map of Iisalmi
- Coordinates: 63°33′24″N 27°11′18″E
- Country: Finland
- Region: North Savo
- Sub-region: Upper Savo
- Charter: 1627
- City rights: 1891

Government
  - City Mayor: Jarmo Ronkainen (2013–)
  - Chairman of the City Board: Juho Pulkka (2021–25)
  - Chairman of the City Council: Kati Åhman (2021–25)

Area (2018-01-01)
  - Total: 872.20 km^{2} (336.76 sq mi)
  - Land: 762.99 km^{2} (294.59 sq mi)
  - Water: 109.22 km^{2} (42.17 sq mi)
  - Rank: 110th largest in Finland

Population (2025-12-31)
  - Total: 20,205
  - Rank: 53rd largest in Finland
  - Density: 26.48/km^{2} (68.6/sq mi)

Population by native language
  - Finnish: 95% (official)
  - Others: 5%

Population by age
  - 0 to 14: 14.9%
  - 15 to 64: 58%
  - 65 or older: 27.2%
- Time zone: UTC+02:00 (EET)
  - Summer (DST): UTC+03:00 (EEST)
- Website: www.iisalmi.fi

Iisalmi (Finnish: [ˈiːsɑlmi]; Swedish: Idensalmi) is a town and municipality in the region of North Savo in Finland. It is located 87 kilometres (54 mi) north of Kuopio and south of Kajaani. The municipality has a population of 20,205 (31 December 2025), which makes it the second largest of the five towns in North Savo in population, only Kuopio being larger. It covers an area of 872.20 square kilometres (336.76 sq mi) of which 109.22 km^{2} (42.17 sq mi) is water. The population density is 26.48 inhabitants per square kilometre (68.6/sq mi). The municipality is unilingually Finnish.

In the 2010s, Iisalmi is known as an export industry town, as well as a significant study town in the region.

== History ==
Iisalmi traces its roots back to 1627, when the parish of Iisalmi was formed around the local church. The town's old wooden church, Gustav Adolf Church, was consecrated in 1780.

In the 18th century, when Finland was under Swedish control, Sweden was frequently at war with Imperial Russia, and the area of Koljonvirta in Iisalmi was a battlefield on which one of the greatest Swedish victories (and the last Swedish victory on Finnish soil) occurred. However, Sweden lost its last war with Russia and had to surrender Finland to the Russian Empire in 1809.

Iisalmi gained its status as town on October 20, 1891.

== Geography ==
There are 111 lakes in the Iisalmi region, the largest of which are Lake Onkivesi, Lake Haapajärvi, Lake Porovesi and Lake Nerkoo.

== Economy ==
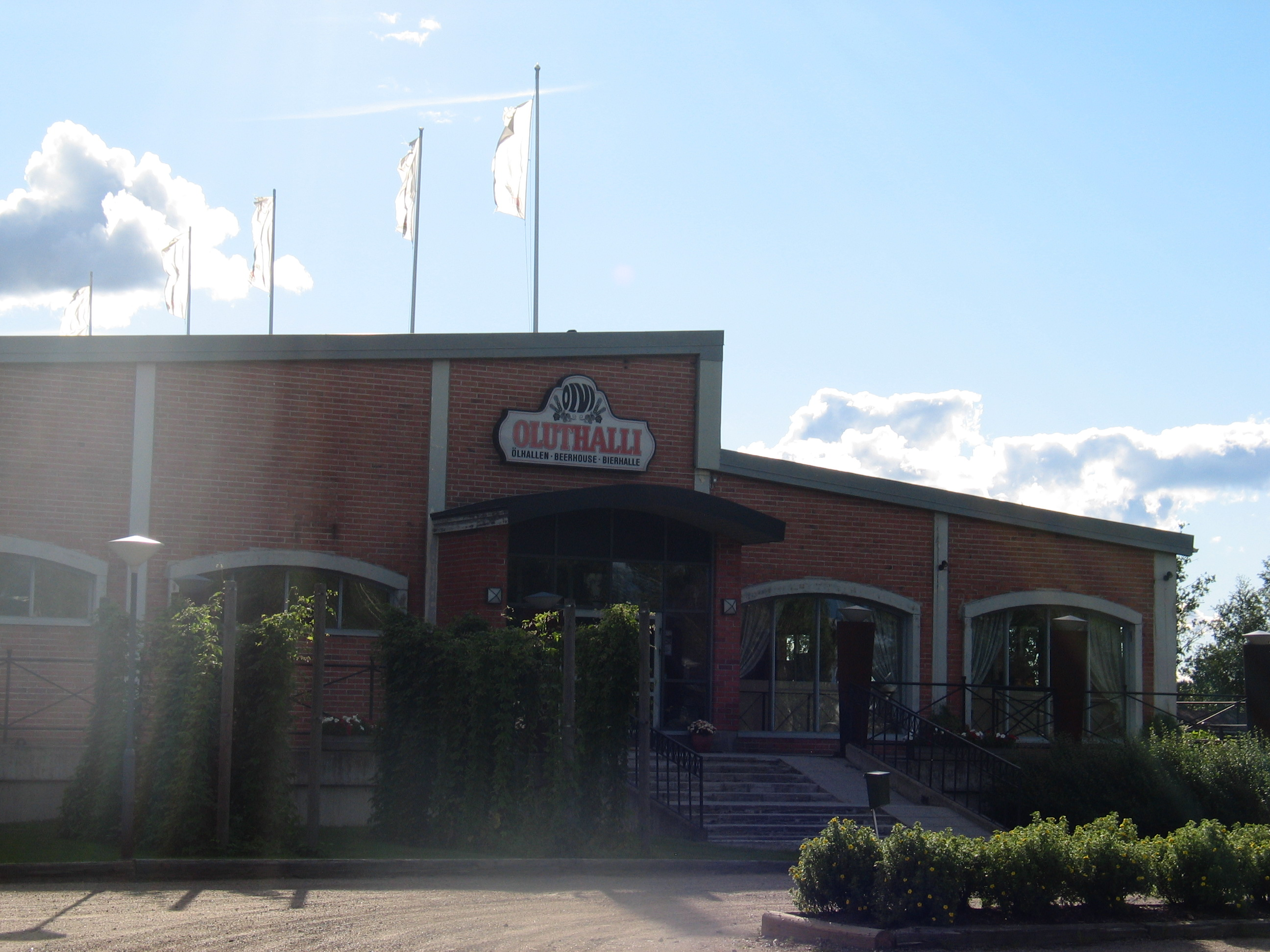
The Olvi beer restaurant in Iisalmi

Olvi, the last big independent beer brewery in Finland, has its factory and headquarters in Iisalmi. (Other big Finnish breweries have been bought by multinational companies.)

Genelec, a manufacturer of active monitors and loudspeakers used in recording studios worldwide, has its factory and headquarters in Iisalmi.

Normet, engineers and manufacturers of mechanised equipment for underground rock-mining and tunnelling, also has its factory and headquarters in Iisalmi.

Profile Vehicles makes ambulances and police cars.

Iisalmi has its own railway station on the VR network. The line between Iisalmi and Oulu was electrified in December 2006, replacing diesel haulage of trains.

== Culture ==
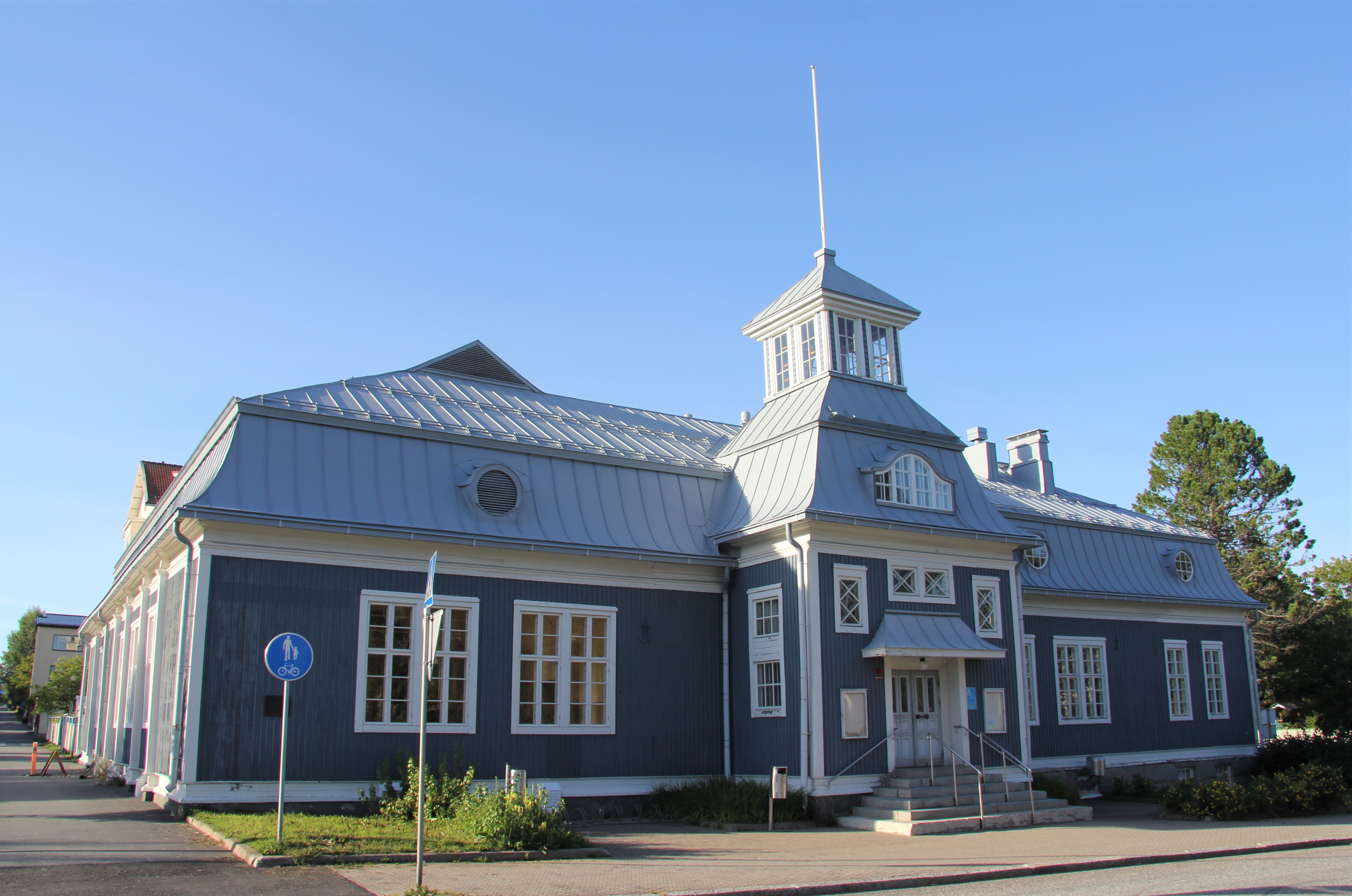
Iisalmi Youth Center

=== Events ===
Iisalmi, even though being a relatively small town, has many cultural events on small and somewhat larger scales. One event, of the many, is "Rompepäivät", which translates as "the days of old junk and stuff". People gather together bringing various old items, from small sewing needles to old tractors, for everyone to see and many small things to be sold. A few old restored cars, trucks, motorcycles and tractors, some of them Finnish-made, are displayed for others to see.

"Oluset" is a music festival organized each July annually. The main sponsor is local brewery company Olvi. "Oluset" roughly translates to "a few beers". Also a smaller festival, "Limuset" ("Little soft drink festival" is organize as well by Olvi. "Limuset" is mainly dedicated to kids and young people, and no alcoholic drinks are sold in the area.

=== Food ===
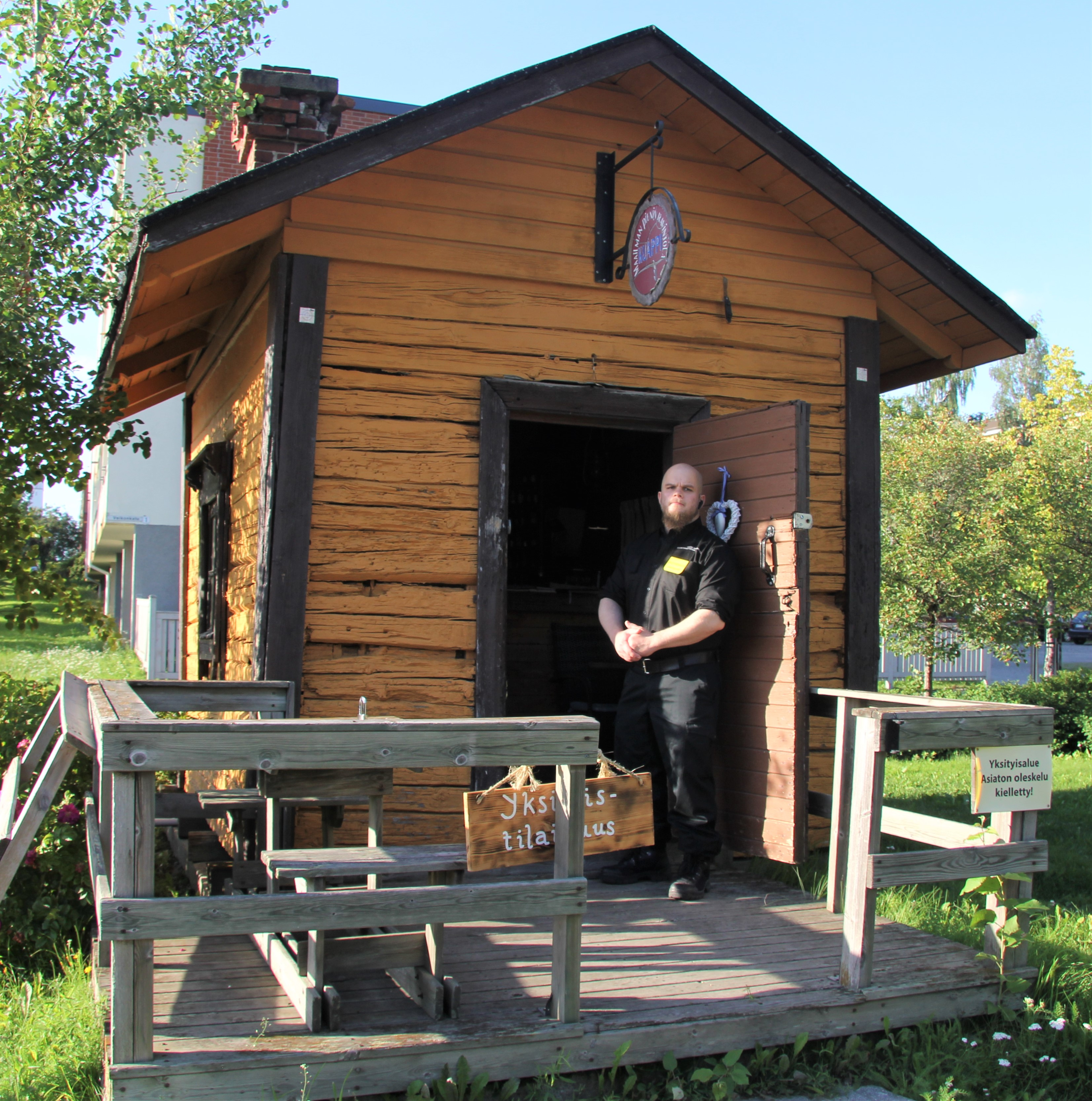
Restaurant Kuappi

In the 1980s, each municipality in Savo voted for its own parish dishes. For Iisalmi, the choice was Muurinpohjalettu, a thin pancake or crêpe made of wheat and barley.

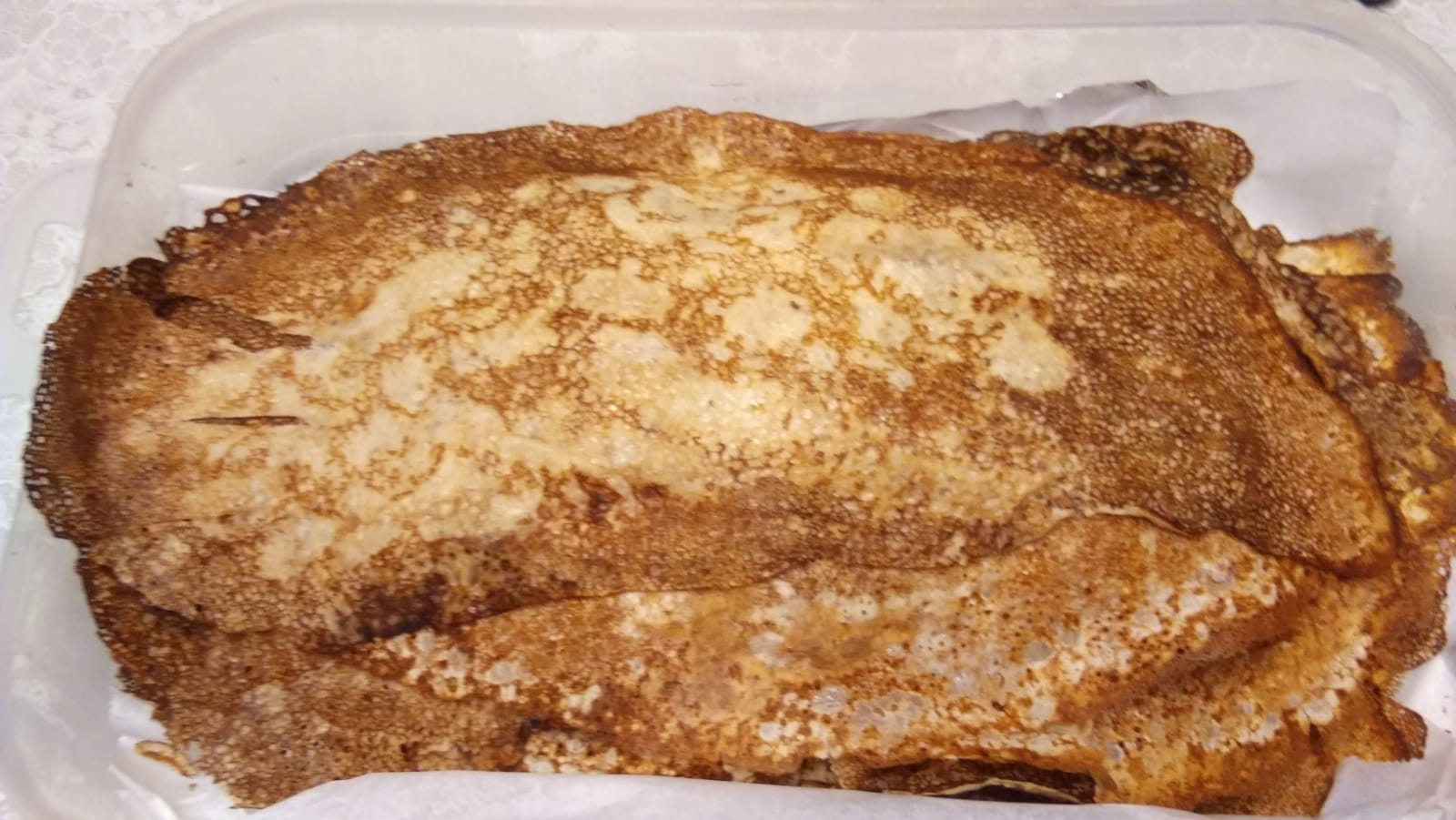
Muurinpohjalettu

According to the Guinness Book of Records, the world's smallest restaurant, Kuappi, is located in Iisalmi.

=== Music ===
Currently the most famous Iisalmi-based band is a humorous country-rock orchestra Halavatun Papat. A rough translation of the name is "Damn Grandfathers".

20th-century composer Joonas Kokkonen was born here, as were singer-songwriter Jaakko Teppo and jazz pianist and composer Jarmo Savolainen.

=== Sports ===
Iisalmi is best known for its football club, PK-37 and ice hockey club, IPK (Iisalmen Peli-Karhut). Other known sports clubs are FBI (floorball club), Iisalmen palloveikot, Klubi-36, Iina, Iisalmen Visa and Koljonvirran ratsastajat (riding club).

Iisalmi has many locations for playing sports. There is a frisbee golf place near the Paloisvuori ski center. There are also many beaches in Iisalmi, for example Perttu's beach and the Beach of the City. Many beaches offer an opportunity for beach volleyball too. In winter time Iisalmi offers ski trails and skating rinks; winter sports fans may also go downhill skiing and snowboarding at the Paloisvuori ski center. In addition, Iisalmi has facilities for gym workouts, swimming, motorsports, bowling and minigolf.

== Notable people ==
- Miina Äkkijyrkkä (born 1949), artist
- Seppo Kääriäinen (born 1948), politician
- Maggie Keskinen (born 1990), politician
- Edvin Laine (1905–1989), film director and actor
- Eppu Nuotio (born 1962), actress and writer

== International relations ==
=== Twin towns — Sister cities ===
Iisalmi is twinned with:

- Notodden, Norway
- Pécel, Hungary
- Nyköping, Sweden
- Lüneburg, Germany
- Nykøbing Falster, Denmark
- Kirishi, Russia
- Võru, Estonia

== See also ==
- Finnish national road 5
- Holy Cross Church, Iisalmi
- Iisalmi Airfield
