= Lappi, Tampere =

City district in Tampere, Finland

Coordinates: 61°30′32.17817″N 23°46′40.01333″E

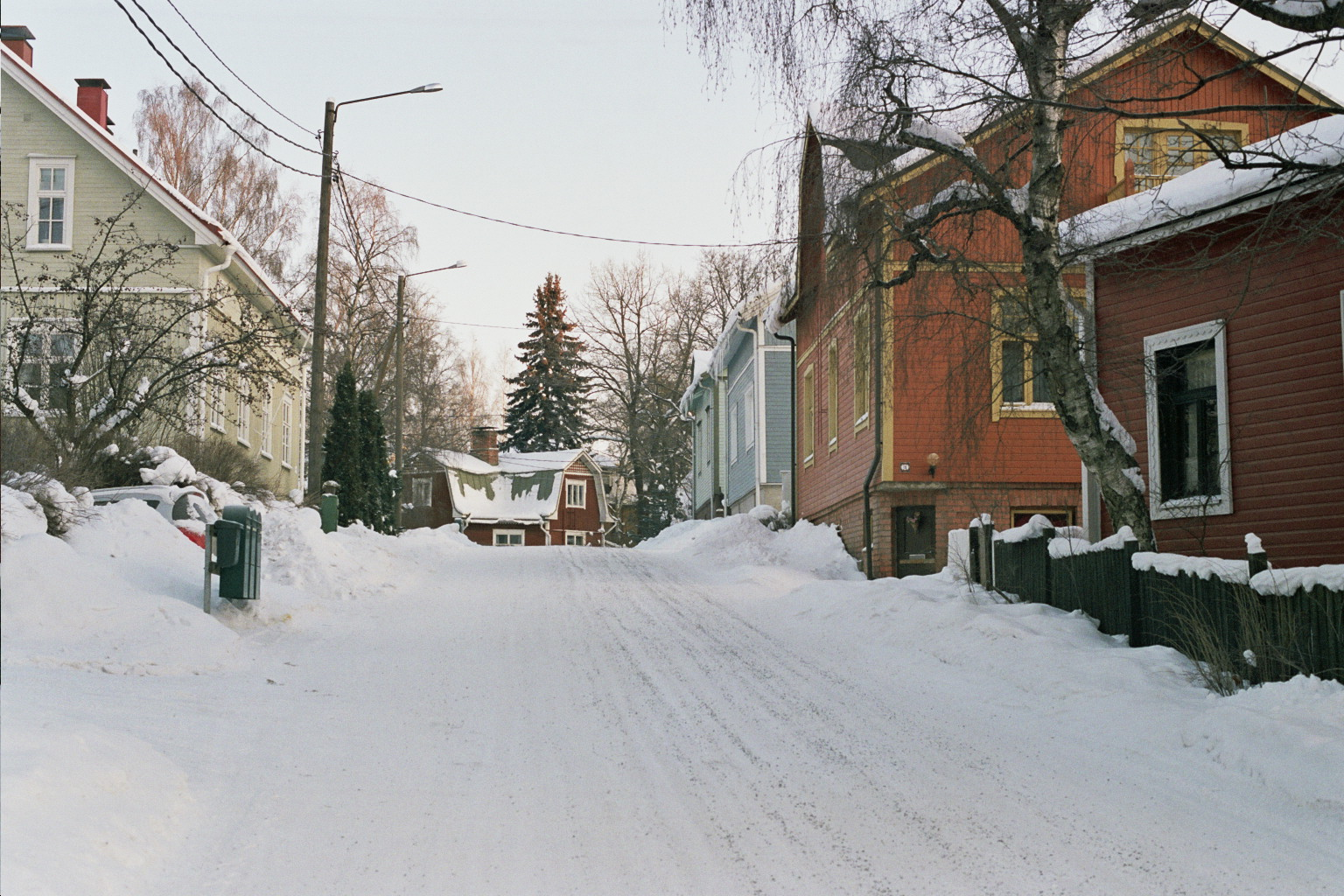
Wooden houses along the Aaltotie street in Lappi

Lappi is a district in Tampere, Finland, near the Lake Näsijärvi and the Kauppi's park area. About 700 people live there. When talking about Lappi, reference is usually made to the Lapinniemi district. The district is home to the Koukkuniemi's nursing home, which is one of the largest nursing homes in Europe. There are also yacht clubs in the area (e.g. Tampere Yacht Club) and a spa and apartments in an old factory building were completed for the 1990 housing fair.

The Lappi district got its name from Lapinniemi, which piers Lake Näsijärvi. The name may refer to early Lappish settlement. Part of the Lappi district is called Käpylä, which refers to the first inhabitant of the area, August Käpynen, a worker who moved there in 1915. The town plan for Lappi was confirmed in 1933. The Naistenlahti area, which officially forms one district of Tampere together with the old factory area of Tampella, became the property of the city of Tampere in 1877, at the same time as the city bought the Kyttälä area from Hatanpää Manor. Behind the name of Naistenlahti is a story according to which women on their way from Teisko to Messukylä Church got ashore here to continue their final journey.

The Finnish Heritage Agency has classified Lappi's detached house area as a nationally significant built cultural environment.

== See also ==
- Petsamo, Tampere

== Sources ==
- Maija Louhivaara: Tampereen kadunnimet. Tampereen museoiden julkaisuja 51, 1999, Tampere. ISBN 951-609-105-9. (in Finnish)
