= Gustav Adolf Church, Iisalmi =

Church in Iisalmi, Finland

Coordinates: 63°34′48″N 027°10′18″E

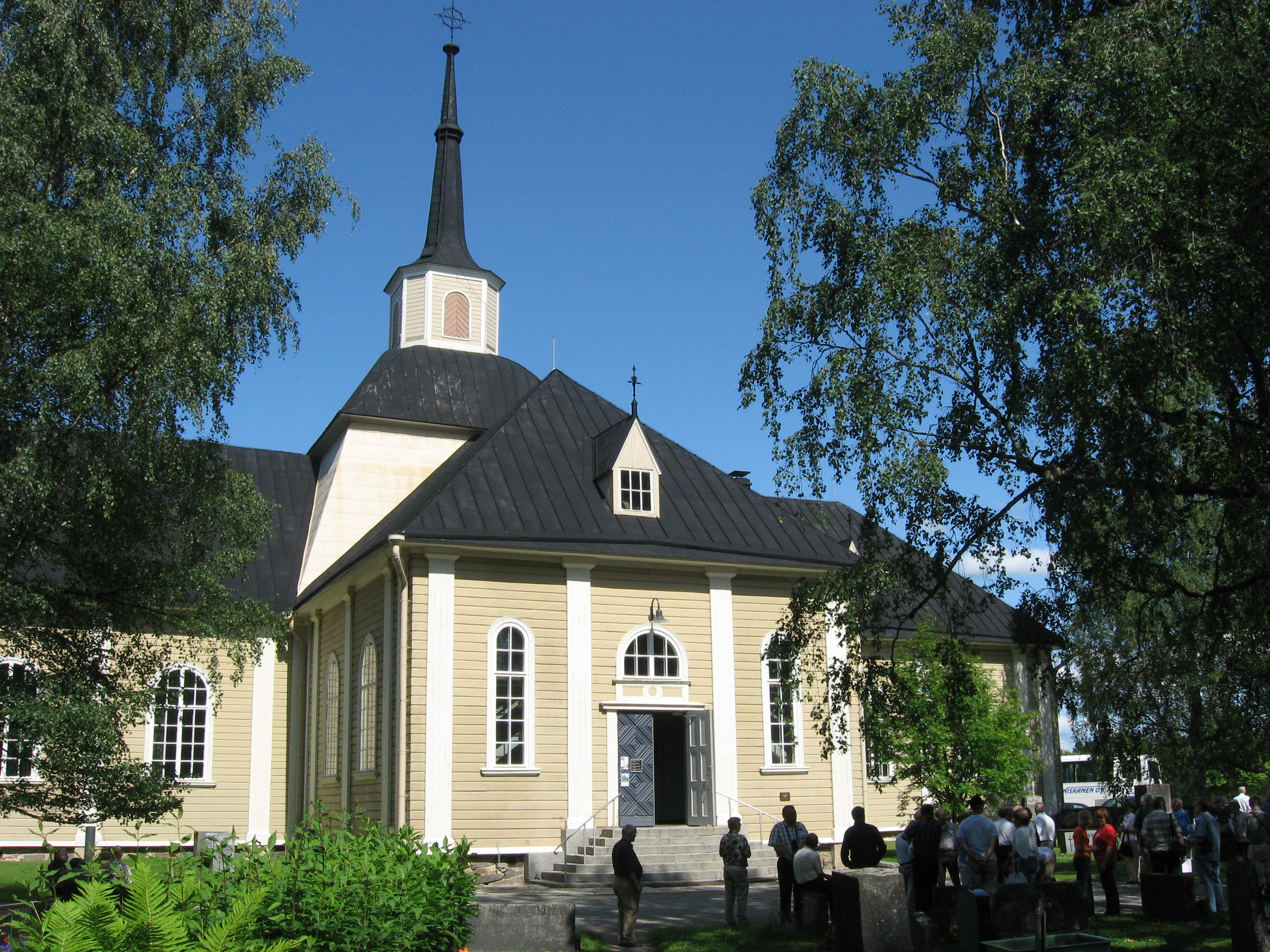
Church at July 2009

Gustav Adolf Church (Finnish: Kustaa Aadolfin kirkko, Swedish: Gustav Adolfs kyrka), also known as Iisalmi Old Church (Finnish: Iisalmen vanha kirkko, Swedish: Idensalmi gamla kyrka), is a wooden church in Iisalmi, Finland, which was consecrated in 1780. The Finnish Heritage Agency has classified the church as a nationally significant built cultural environment. Prior to the union of municipalities and parishes in the early 1970s, the Gustav Adolf Church was the main church of the Iisalmi rural parish, while the town parish used a new church completed in 1934. The church was to be named after the then Swedish heir to the crown, Gustav Adolf, and the use of the name was approved by the ruler later in the autumn.

== History ==
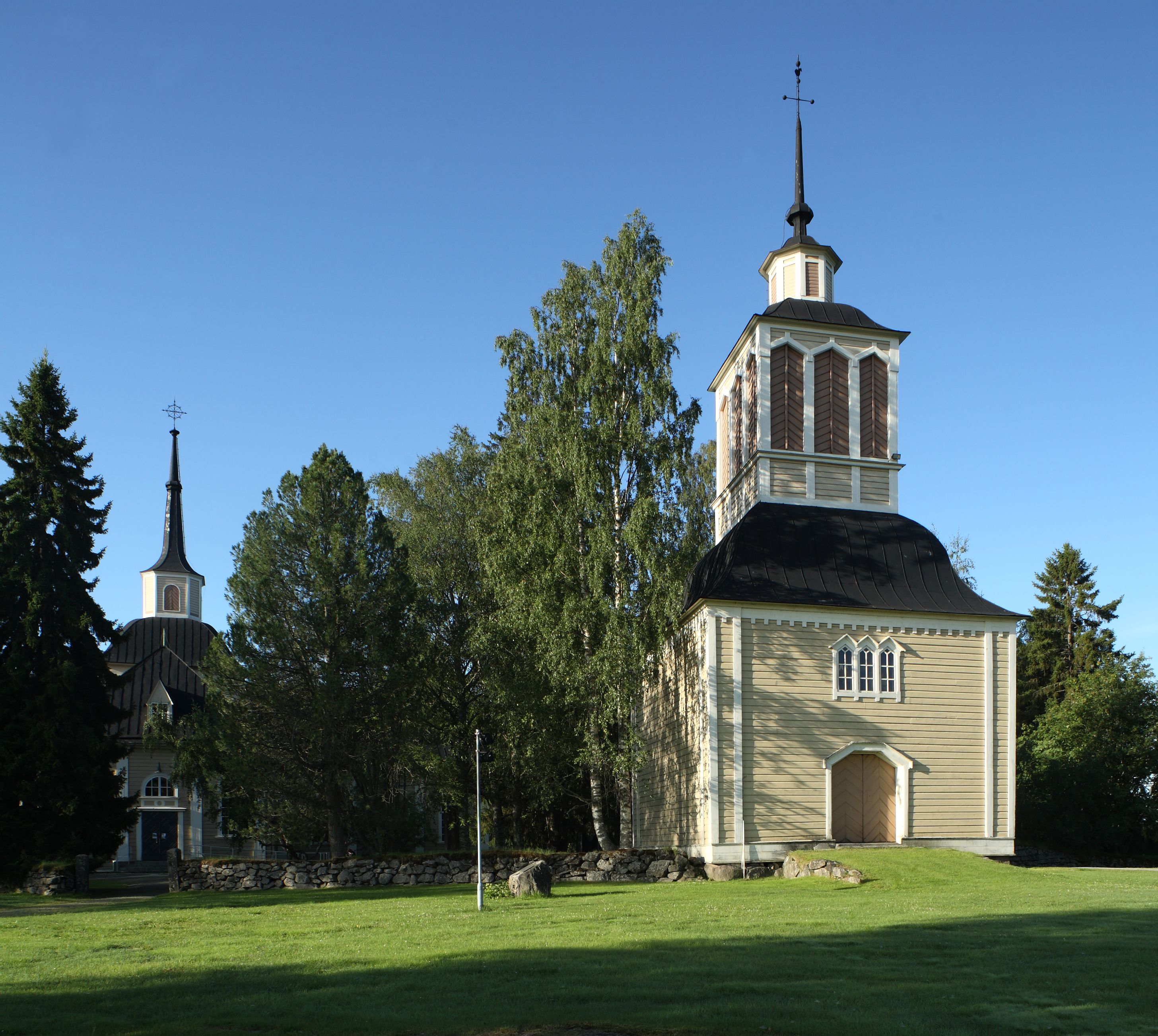
Old belfry

The Gustav Adolf Church is the third church building in the history of the parish; the first church was destroyed in a fire in 1700 and the second was demolished due to its poor condition after the present church was completed. Drawings for the third wooden church were obtained from the Superintendent Office of Stockholm, and the construction work started in 1778 was carried out under the direction of Simon Silvén, a church builder and master builder from Kalajoki, in 1779–1780. The church was consecrated by Pastor Johan Lagus on March 5, 1780.

According to the memorial plaque of the churches attached to the belfry, the belfry dates from 1700. According to the source, the belfry dates back to the middle of the 18th century, but the exact year of construction is unknown. In 1752, the belfry was tarred under the direction of master builder Anders Brovall, and painted by Mikael Toppelius in 1756.

The church has been renovated several times. In 1876, the church was renovated in terms of interior and exterior architecture and interior design in accordance with a proposal made by architect F. A. Sjöström, when, among other things, the inner vault was demolished. In 1927, the church was altered and the interior was renovated according to plans of architect Rafael Blomstedt. Since then, the changes made in the church have been minor.

== See also ==
- Holy Cross Church, Iisalmi

== Sources ==
- Marja Terttu Knapas (1993). "Iisalmen kirkot". Ylä-Savon kirkot (in Finnish). Finnish Heritage Agency. ISBN 951-9075-65-8.
