= Kauppi =

Kauppi is a Finnish surname. Notable people with the surname include:

- Emil Kauppi (1865–1930), Finnish composer
- Kalle Kauppi (1892–1961), Finnish legal scholar and politician
- Waino Kauppi (1898–1932), musician
- Raili Kauppi (1920–1995), Finnish philosopher
- Ossi Kauppi (1929–2000), Finnish ice hockey player
- Kirsti Kauppi (born 1957), Finnish diplomat
- Lo Kauppi (born 1970), Swedish film and theater actress
- Piia-Noora Kauppi (born 1975), Finnish politician
- Minna Kauppi (born 1982), Finnish orienteer
- Kalle Kauppi (footballer) (born 1992), Finnish footballer
- Mauno Kauppi (1927–1998), Hall of Fame Canadian-Finnish hockey player 1943-1954

== See also ==
- Kuappi
