= Maggie Keskinen =

Finnish politician (born 1990)

- Keskinen in 2026.

The Secretary of the National Coalition Party
- Incumbent
- Assumed office 2025

Personal details
- Born: 1990 (age 35–36) Iisalmi, Finland
- Party: National Coalition Party

Maggie Keskinen (born 1990) is a Finnish politician, who has served as the secretary of the National Coalition Party since 2025. She has a background in the leadership of political and international affairs for the City of Tampere, as well as in various elected and organizational roles within the National Coalition Party in the Pirkanmaa region. Keskinen holds a master's degree in Social Sciences from the University of Tampere.

Keskinen is a citizen of both Finland and the United States; she is a registered Democratic voter in Georgia.
