= Normet =

Global technology company

- Company type: Private
- Industry: Underground mining and tunnelling equipment
- Founded: 1962
- Founder: Jaakko Sarvela, Jussi Sarvela
- Headquarters: Espoo, Finland
- Area served: Worldwide
- Key people: Ed Santamaria (President & CEO)
- Products: Underground equipment; concrete spraying; rock reinforcement
- Number of employees: >1,800 (2025)
- Website: www.normet.com

Normet is a private Finland-headquartered, global technology company. The company manufactures underground equipment and applications and provides aftermarket services, construction chemicals, and rock support products and expertise for customer processes in underground mining and tunnelling as well as for civil construction industries. Normet employs over 1,800 professionals and operates globally in over 50 locations and 30 countries.

== History ==
=== Peltosalmi Machine Workshop (1962–1972) ===
Normet's roots trace back to 1962 when brothers, farmer Jaakko Sarvela and agronomist Jussi Sarvela, founded a machine workshop on their farm after transitioning to livestock-free agriculture. In the old barn of the farm, earthmoving equipment suitable for tractors started to be manufactured with a workforce of two employees. Within the first three years of operation, the company's workforce exceeded fifty, and the product range shifted primarily to the manufacturing of forestry machinery. Export of products began.

The company's flagship product was a tractor loader. Other products from the early days of the workshop included forestry machines such as a skidding winch and Finland's first three-axle forestry tractor. The Sarvela brothers received a national entrepreneur award in 1969.

=== Normet Oy (1972–2004) ===
In 1972, the Sarvelas sold their company to Orion Corporation, which acquired the machine workshop employing 180 people. The background of the deal was Orion's fear that the state might socialise the company. By venturing into the machine workshop industry, it believed it would save at least one business area if the state were to take over medicine manufacturing. With the acquisition, the name was changed to Normet Oy, and the company began exporting mining machines to Sweden.

In early 1999, Orion sold its subsidiary Normet to Sitra's' Fenno Management. The company employed approximately 310 people.

In 2004, Normet's net sales were 44 million euros.

=== Normet Group (2005–) ===
In 2005, the entire share capital of Normet was sold to a company named Normet Group. The owners of Normet Group were Cantell Oy (70 percent stake), Anssi Soila, and Normet's management (30 percent combined). Cantell Oy was owned by board professional and investor Aaro Cantell. The group employed about 210 people at this time.

In 2008, Normet had 17 offices in nine countries. A new office was planned in Mongolia, where the world's largest copper deposit had been found. The largest delivery of the year consisted of over 60 mining machines exported to Russia for Norilsk Nickel. The deal was worth over 20 million euros.

In 2009, Normet's net sales exceeded 90 million euros.

In 2010, Normet manufactured a heavy series of mining equipment in Iisalmi and Santiago de Chile, and the group employed about 450 professionals in 23 countries. Also in 2010, Normet expanded its business into construction chemicals by acquiring 40 percent of TAM International. TAM International employed over 70 people, and its net sales were 9 million euros. The group's net sales were over 100 million euros, and it had over 600 employees.

In 2011, Normet acquired Swedish company Essverk Berg AB, which manufactured and serviced mining and tunnel construction equipment. The company had 25 employees in Ludvika. Normet's net sales were 170 million euros.

In early 2012, Normet had 700 employees, about half of whom were in Iisalmi. Large mining and tunnelling machines were assembled at the Iisalmi equipment manufacturing site. In 2012, Normet acquired 60 percent of its associate company TAM Group, which then became fully owned by Normet. Net sales increased that year by nearly 40 percent to 235 million euros, and its operating profit by 68 percent. New subsidiaries started operating in Mexico, Norway, and South Africa. The company's main products were solutions for charging and blasting, drilling processes, and ground support in tunnel construction and underground mining. It also developed, manufactured, and marketed heavy machinery and construction chemicals.

In 2016, Normet acquired the concrete spraying business from Swedish company Atlas Copco.

In 2019, Normet commenced the development of battery powered Normet SmartDrive® vehicles to drive electrification in the industry. The first vehicle to enter the market was an electric battery powered concrete spraying version.

In 2019, Ed Santamaria took over as President and CEO, succeeding Robin Lindahl.

In 2022, Normet acquired the Australian company Garock, a leading manufacturer of ground support systems for the mining industries rock reinforcement solutions. The acquisition of Aliva Equipment, a manufacturer of equipment and accessories for the application of sprayed concrete, also took place in 2022.

In 2022, Normet opened a global technology and production hub in Jaipur, India. The new facility houses an equipment production facility, a service rebuild centre, an R&D centre, a remote monitoring centre, and a technology training centre for operations and maintenance.

In 2023, Normet acquired the Finland-based boom systems manufacturer Rambooms and hydraulic attachments supplier Marakon.

In 2023, Normet also acquired Finland-based Remion Ltd, which designs and implements industrial internet service solutions.

In 2023, Normet became a minority shareholder of Lekatech, a Finnish start-up focused on revolutionising electric hammering technology, and the Swiss company Motics, a specialist in electric drive and battery storage solutions for off-highway applications.

=== Accolades ===
Ernst & Young awarded Aaro Cantell the Entrepreneur of the Year award in 2008. In 2011, Normet Group was awarded the President of the Republic's Internationalization Award.
