= Holy Cross Church, Iisalmi =

Church in Iisalmi, Finland

Coordinates: 63°33′30.9″N 027°10′55.6″E

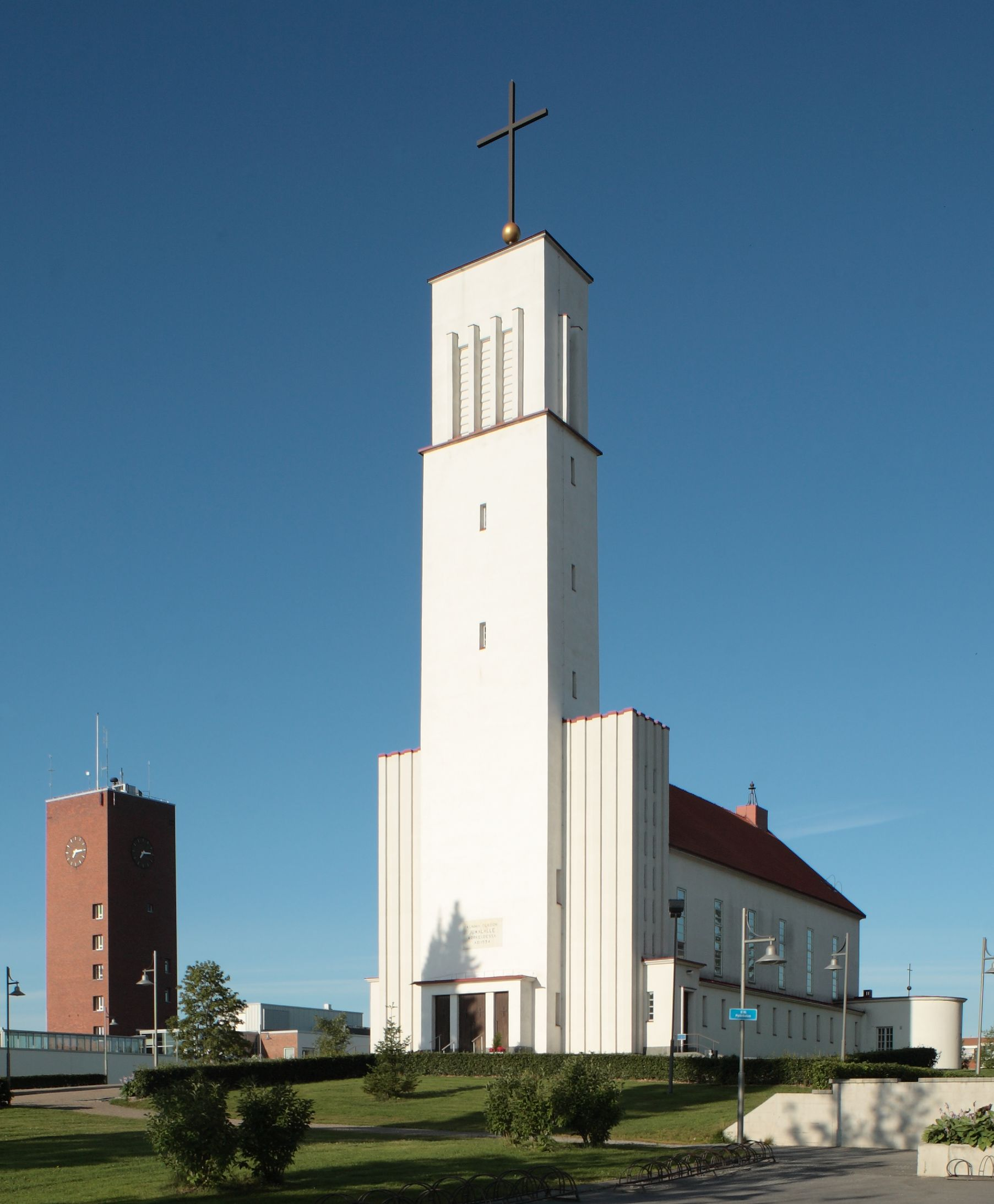
Church at July 2009

Holy Cross Church (Finnish: Pyhän Ristin kirkko), also known as Iisalmi New Church (Finnish: Iisalmen uusikirkko), is a stone church in Iisalmi, Finland, which was consecrated in 1934. The church, designed by Eino Pitkänen, is a basilica with an end tower. The church, built of brick and concrete, represents a modernity based on classicism, which already resembles functionalism with its light wall surfaces. Before the association of municipalities and parishes in the North Savo region in 1970, the Holy Cross Church was the main church of the Iisalmi Town Parish.

The altarpiece is a mosaic by artist Uuno Eskola and depicts the crucified Jesus.

== See also ==
- Gustav Adolf Church, Iisalmi

== Sources ==
- Marja Terttu Knapas (1993). "Iisalmen kirkot". Ylä-Savon kirkot (in Finnish). Finnish Heritage Agency. ISBN 951-9075-65-8.
