= Petsamo, Tampere =

City district in Tampere, Finland

Coordinates: 61°30′25.80″N 23°47′41.08″E

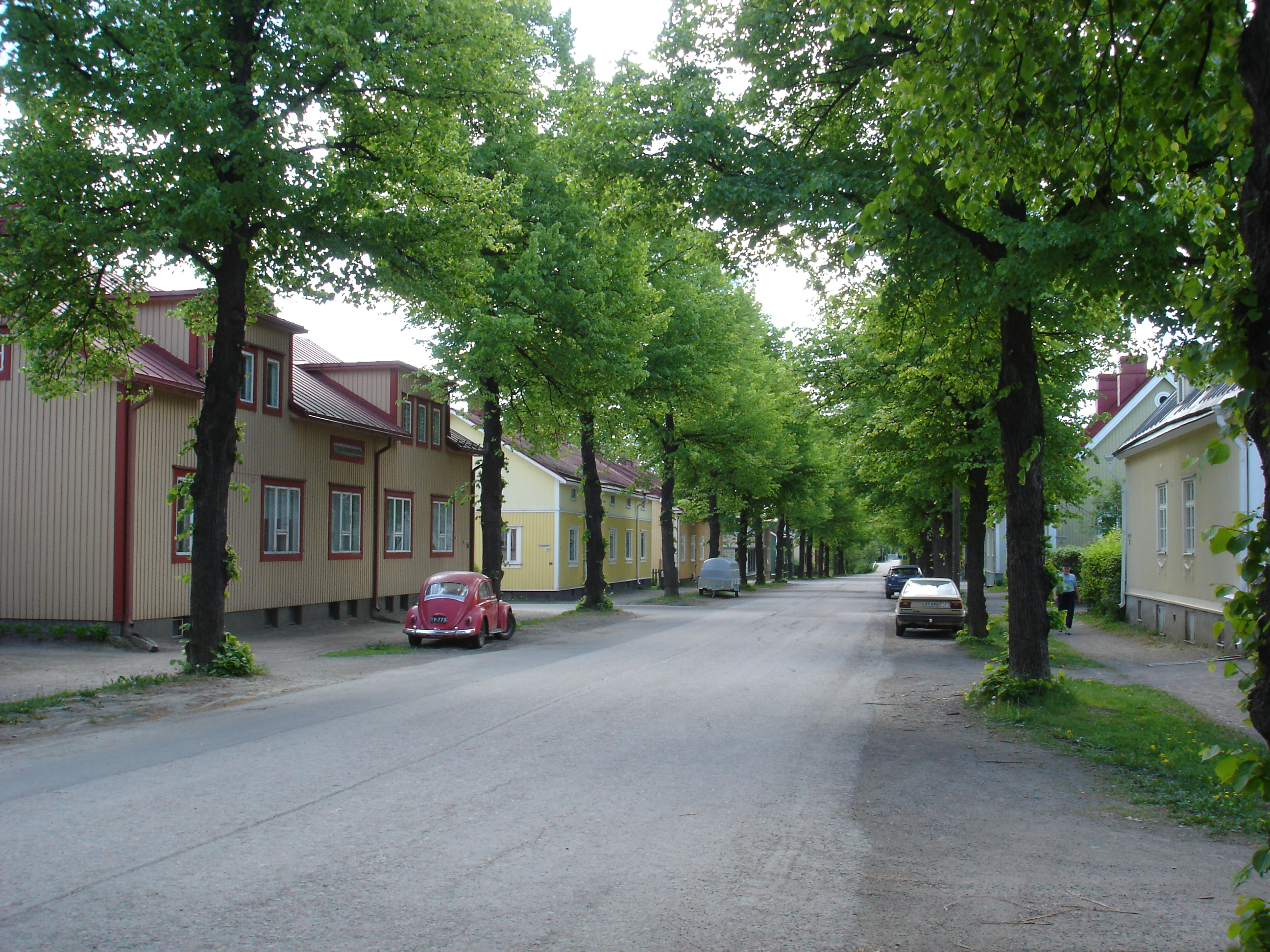
Wooden houses along the Kaupinkatu street in Petsamo

Petsamo is a district of Tampere, Finland. The district is named after Pechenga (Finnish: Petsamo), which Finland acquired in the Treaty of Tartu. At the same time as Soviet Russia ceded Petsamo to Finland in 1920, some large Tamperean industrial plants began to build a residential area for their working population on the northeast corner of the city. When the area seemed to be far from the center, the informal name of the district was born as a result of the image.

The neighboring parts of Petsamo are Kauppi, Kaleva, Liisankallio, Tammela, Osmonmäki, Lappi and Lapinniemi. Petsamo is bordered on the north by Kauppi, on the east by Kauppi and Kaleva, on the south by the Ilmarinkatu street and in the west by Tammela.

The Litukka's allotment garden, founded in 1922, is located in the Petsamo and Kauppi districts. The name Litukka is derived from Vilhelmiina and Erland Litukka, who moved from Pirkkala to the area in the late 19th century and built a small farm on land leased from the city of Tampere. Before the allotment garden, a nursery for schoolchildren was established in the Litukka area. Tampere's eastern bypass, Kekkosentie, completed in 1989, bisects the allotment garden and the entire Petsamo district. In addition to the allotment garden, the area is home to Kauppi's old hospital area, Kauppi's observatory, and Kauppi's both old and new water towers.

== Sources ==
- Pentti W. Jokinen (2004). Pellavanpetsamo : ”Petsamon sonsarit siellä taas luikkaa!” : elämän kirjoa Saukonmäessä 1920-luvulta 1970-luvulle (in Finnish). ISBN 952-91-7765-8.
