= Nerkoonjärvi (Kihniö) =

Lake of Kihniö, Finland

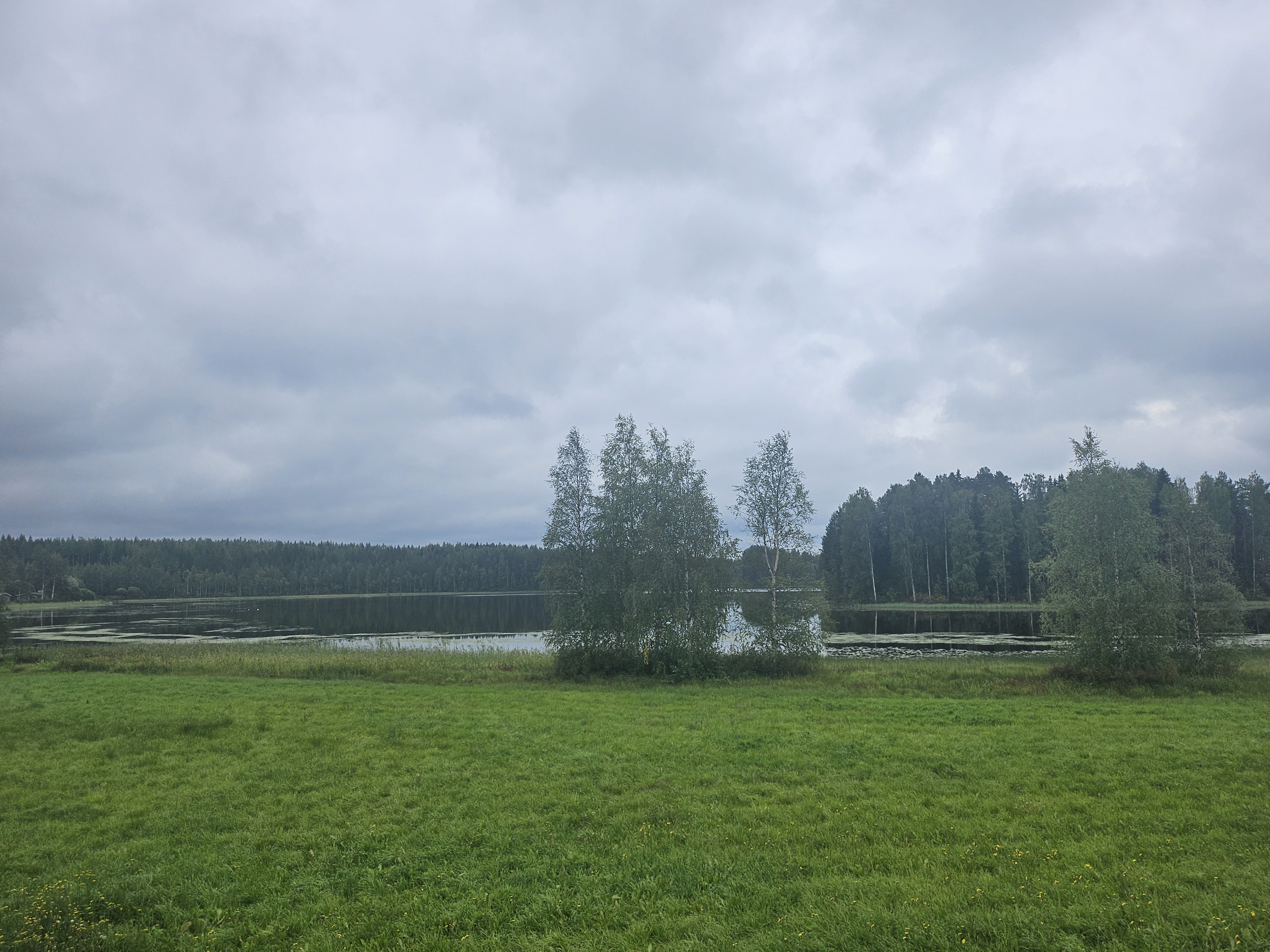

- Location within Finland
- Location: Pirkanmaa
- Coordinates: 62°9′1″N 23°13′2″E
- Primary inflows: Myllyjoki
- Primary outflows: Hirvijoki
- Catchment area: Kokemäenjoki
- Basin countries: Finland
- Surface area: 15.163 km^{2} (5.854 sq mi)
- Average depth: 3.66 m (12.0 ft)
- Max. depth: 16 m (52 ft)
- Water volume: 0.0558 km^{3} (0.0134 cu mi)
- Shore length^{1}: 63.03 km (39.17 mi)
- Surface elevation: 142.8 m (469 ft)
- Frozen: December-April
- Settlements: Kihniö
- ^{1} Shore length is not a well-defined measure.

Nerkoonjärvi (Kihniö) is a medium-sized lake of Pirkanmaa region in Finland. It belongs to Kokemäenjoki main catchment area and it is situated on Kihniö municipality.

== See also ==
- List of lakes in Finland
