= Onkivesi =

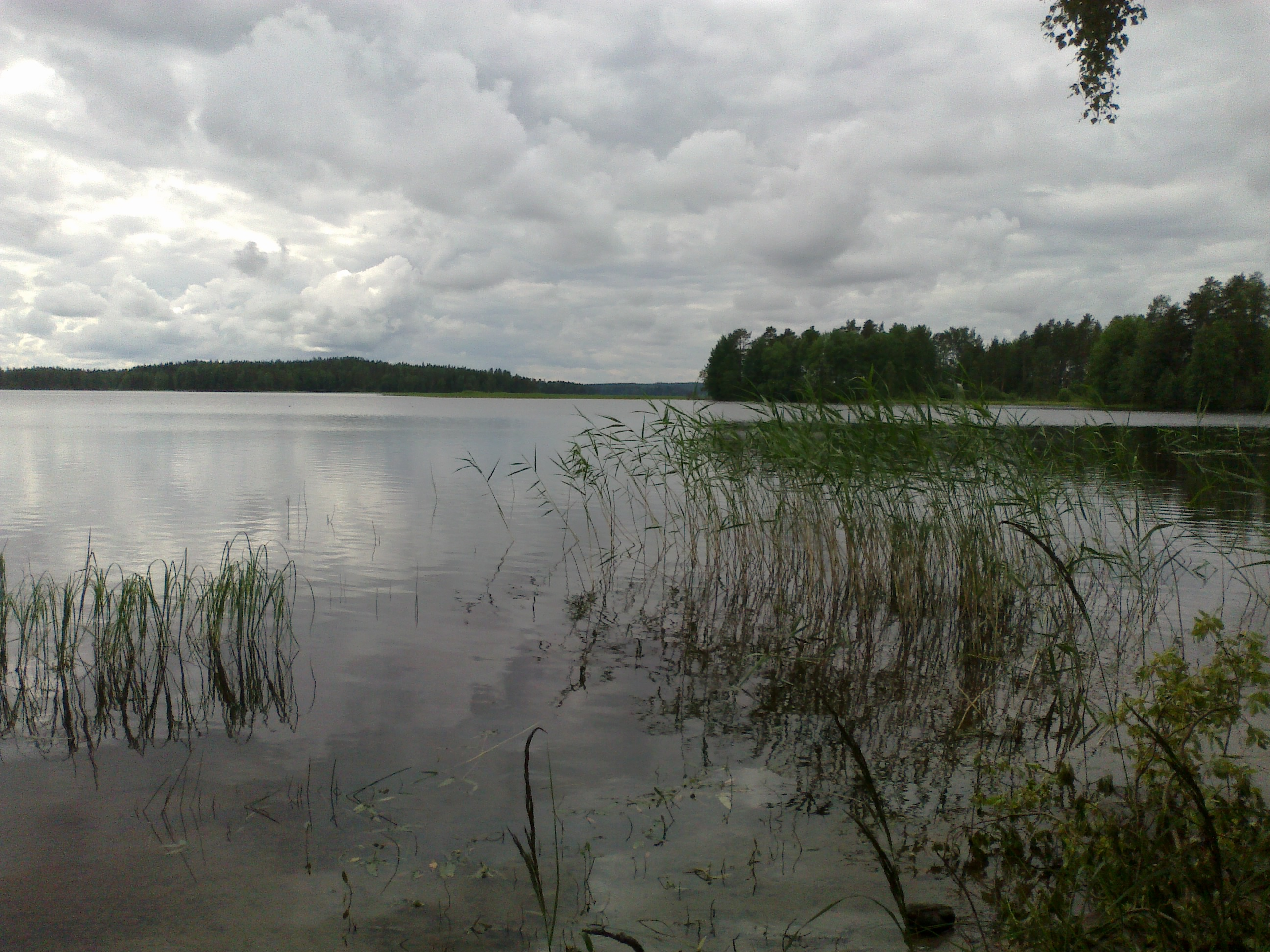

- Location within Finland
- Coordinates: 63°18′N 27°18′E
- Type: Lake
- Basin countries: Finland
- Surface area: 113.62 km^{2} (43.87 sq mi)
- Average depth: 3.2 m (10 ft)
- Max. depth: 36.5 m (120 ft)
- Water volume: 0.36 km^{3} (290,000 acre⋅ft)
- Shore length^{1}: 440.91 km (273.97 mi)
- Surface elevation: 84.7 m (278 ft)
- Frozen: December–April
- Islands: Myhkyrinsaari, Ulmansaari, Viitasaari
- Settlements: Lapinlahti, Maaninka
- ^{1} Shore length is not a well-defined measure.

Onkivesi is a rather large lake of Finland. It belongs to the Vuoksi main catchment area. It is located in the Northern Savonia region and mostly in Lapinlahti municipality. Water in the lake is somewhat brownish partly due to natural inflows and partly due to the location in an agricultural area.

== See also ==
- List of lakes in Finland
