= Kuappi =

Smallest restaurant in the World according to Guinness World Records

Coordinates: 63°33′16.31″N 27°11′8.63″E

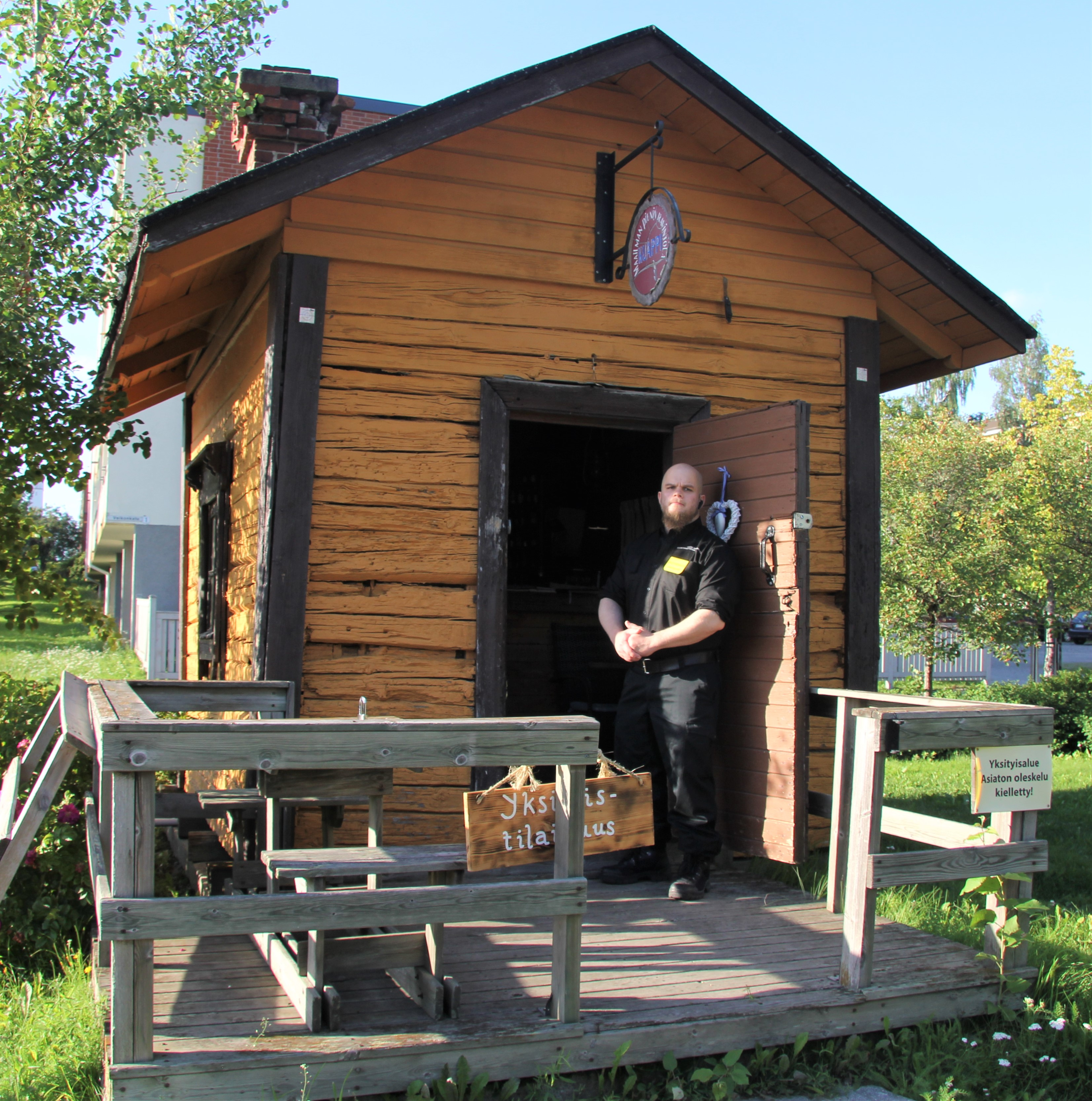
The exterior of Kuappi.

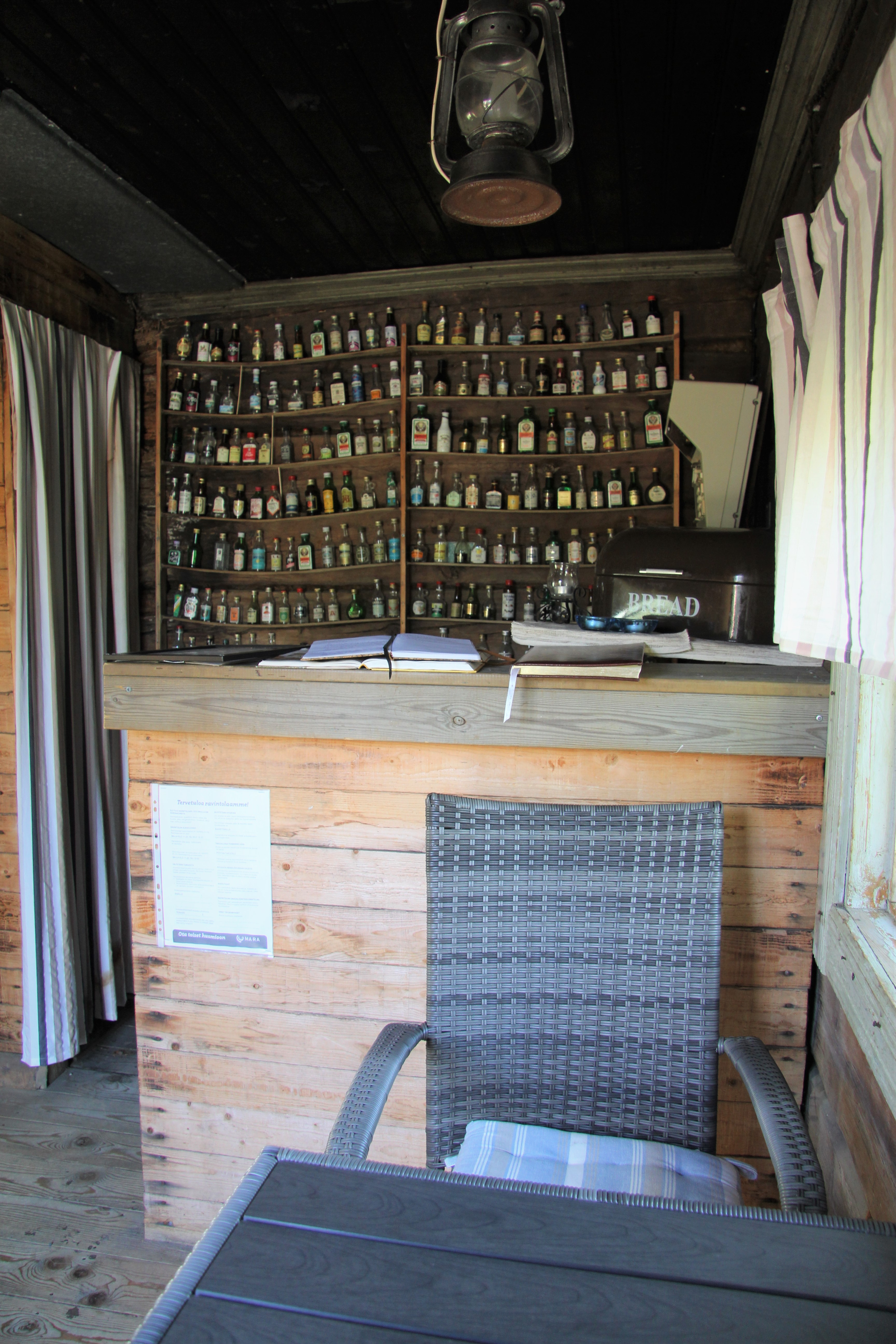
The interior of Kuappi. One of the restaurant's two available seats is pictured; the photographer was sitting in the other.

Kuappi (Finnish pronunciation: [ˈkuɑpːi]) is a restaurant in Iisalmi, Finland. According to Guinness World Records, it is the smallest restaurant in the world. The building has a footprint of 8 m^{2} (86 sq ft), of which 3.6 m^{2} (39 sq ft) is indoors.

The building housing the restaurant was constructed in 1907 as a cabin for Finnish State Railways (now VR Group) track inspectors to rest in, and it was later moved from its trackside location to its current place. It was named Korkki for a long time. Inside the building is a bar, a television, one table for two people and a toilet. The interior of the restaurant is fully licensed to serve alcohol and can seat two people in addition to a waiter. There is also a small terrace outdoors. In late May 2020, there was an announcement that because of the COVID-19 restrictions only one customer could enter the restaurant at a time in early summer 2020. The terrace could still seat two customers as terraces were free of customer limit restrictions.

The name of the restaurant, Kuappi, means "cupboard" in English. The actual word in Finnish is kaappi, but the double vowel "aa" tends to morph into "ua" in Savonian dialects, hence kaappi becomes kuappi.

== Services ==
Kuappi is fully licensed to serve alcoholic beverages to customers.

The restaurant serves a variety of food, including salads, hamburgers, fish, chicken, meat and mushrooms. Famous dishes include fried vendace, hunter's steak sandwich, and pork schnitzel, and traditional Savonian blueberry "kukko" (mustikkakukko) or chocolate cake for dessert.

Because of the small size of the restaurant, it does not have a kitchen. All dishes served at Kuappi are actually prepared in the kitchen of the neighbouring restaurant Olutmestari.

== Kuappirock ==
In summer 2018, Kuappi organised Kuappirock, the smallest rock music festival in the world. A total of four tickets for the festival were sold, and the festival featured one band: a one-man punk rock band called Impotent Givärs. Tickets for the festival were sold at an auction on Facebook, with bids going as high as 125 euros for two tickets.
