= Eppu Nuotio =

Finnish actress and writer (born 1962)

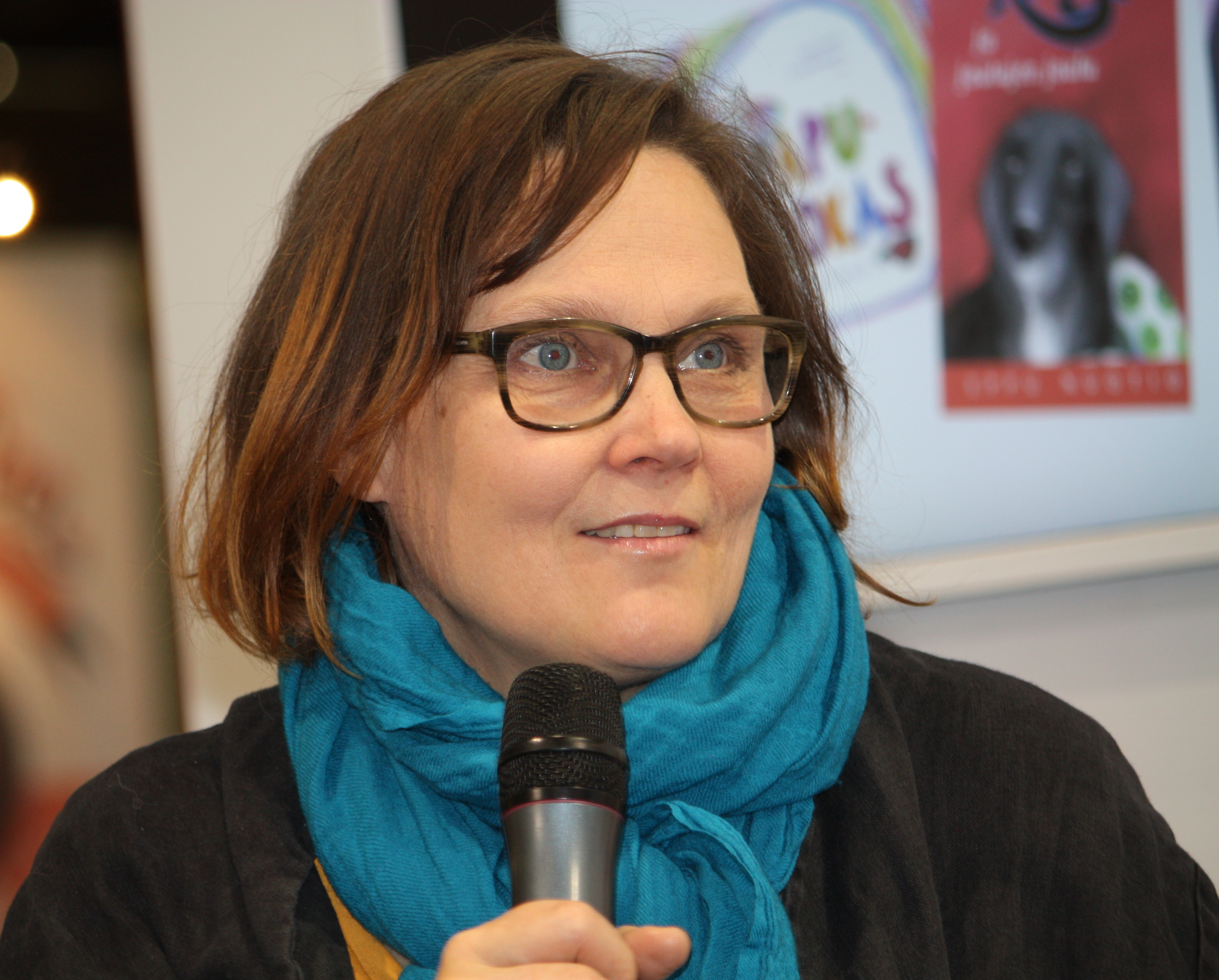
- Eppu Nuotio at the Helsinki Book Fair in 2012.
- Born: Eija-Riitta Silvennoinen; 13 February 1962 (age 64); Iisalmi, Finland

Eppu Nuotio (born Eija-Riitta Silvennoinen; 13 February 1962, in Iisalmi, Finland) is a Finnish actress, author, screenwriter, playwright and columnist.

== Career ==
After having graduated from the Iisalmi Lukio (High School), Nuotio studied dance and mime in France and screenwriting in New York City. She has appeared on several Finnish television series as well as at theaters. Her television appearances include the drama series Tuliportaat ("Stairs of Fire"), Sisaret ("The Siblings") and the character comic series Kesäkerttu ("The Summer Kerttu"), which caused some controversy in Finland in the late 1990s. Sisaret was co-written by Eppu Nuotio and Sirpa Hyttinen. Nuotio has also made translations of stageplays originally published in English or Swedish. Furthermore, she has created lyrics for songs.

Nuotio has published more than twenty children's books since 1994. In 1999 she published an adult book Pariasiaa ("Concerning Couples") under the alias Kerttu Ström. As the alias implies, the book was inspired by her Kesäkerttu character. During 2003–2005 Nuotio published an epic novel trilogy about a girl who was born on the day Marilyn Monroe died. The trilogy chronologically tells about the girl's childhood and teen years in the small Eastern Finnish town of Varkaus and finally about her troubled life in Helsinki in her forties. During 2006–2008 Nuotio created a crime fiction novel trilogy about a young Finnish female journalist called Pii Marin who has to cope with racial slurs while working as the first TV-news anchor of black African origin in Finland. Pii Marin eventually gets her fill and quits the job. She then moves to a small town where she involuntarily gets herself involved in the most horrible crimes. Matila & Röhr Productions is planning to make a feature film based on the first novel of the Pii Marin trilogy (Musta, "The Black One").

In 2002 Eppu Nuotio became a Goodwill Ambassador for UNICEF. She has expressed her concern about sufficiency of potable water in developing countries. In 2008 she made her first trip to Africa to visit people in need.

== Private life ==
Nuotio is married to the Finnish stage director Kurt Nuotio (born 1939). His native language is Swedish. They have three children. The Nuotio family lives on a small island called Hitis in the south-western archipelago of Finland ca 130 kilometers west of Helsinki.
