= Holiday Club =

Finnish company of resort hotels and condominiums

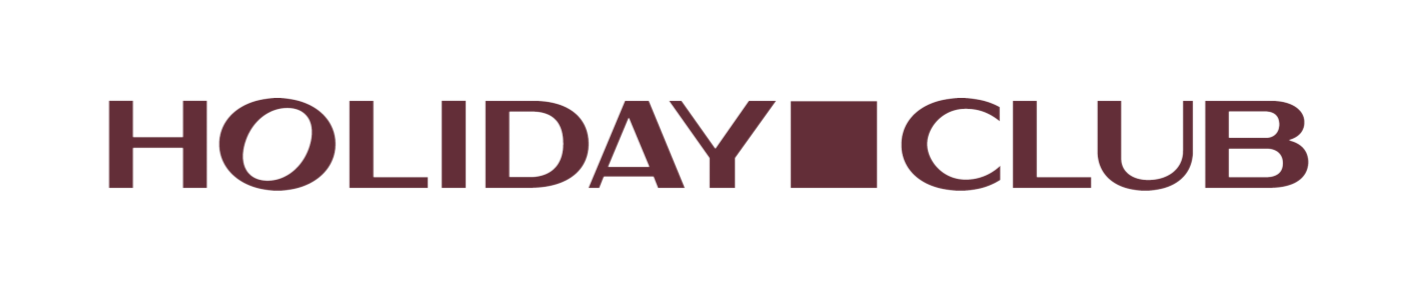

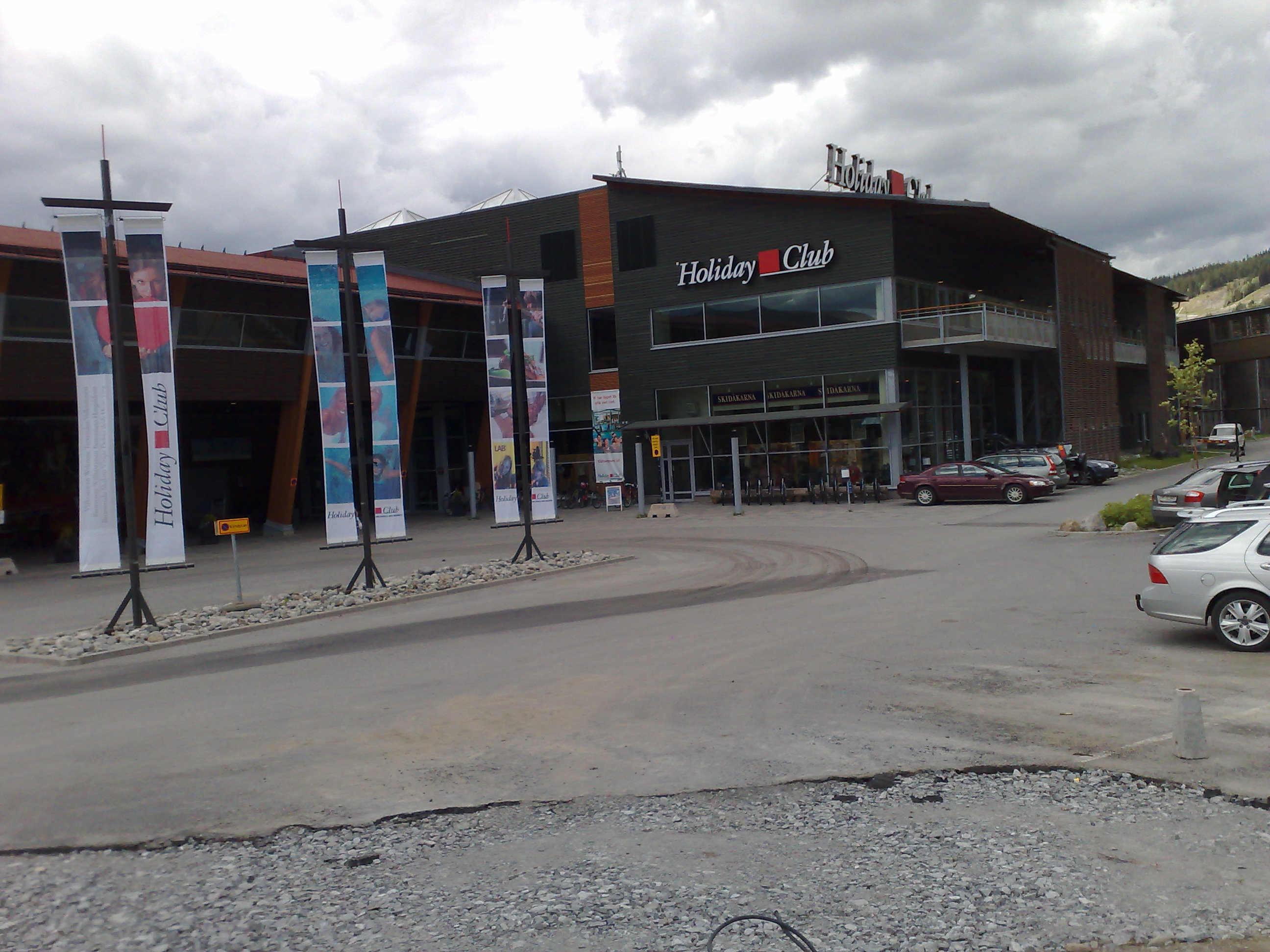
- Holiday Club in Åre, Sweden
- Formerly: Suomen Lomapörssi Oy
- Industry: Hospitality
- Founded: 1986 in Finland
- Area served: Finland, Sweden, Spain
- Key people: Maisa Romanainen, CEO
- Products: Resort hotels and condominiums
- Website: holidayclubresorts.com

Holiday Club Resorts Oy is a Finnish travel company. The company is part of the Indian Mahindra & Mahindra Group. Holiday Club has over 30 holiday destinations with a total of over 2,200 holiday apartments and seven spa hotels. Twenty-six of the resorts are located in Finland, one in Sweden, five in the Canary Islands, and one on Spain's Costa del Sol. In 2025, the group's turnover was approximately €132 million. The company's headquarters are located in Helsinki. It was founded in Finland in 1986 as Suomen Lomapörssi Oy (Finish for "Finnish holiday exchange").

The CEO of Holiday Club is Maisa Romanainen.

Holiday Club's main product is a timeshare, which means a week-long share of a holiday property. Holiday Club has over 120,000 holiday share owners, of which over a thousand are corporate customers. Holiday Club also rents out its own holiday apartments.
