= Esa Piironen =

Finnish architect (born 1943)

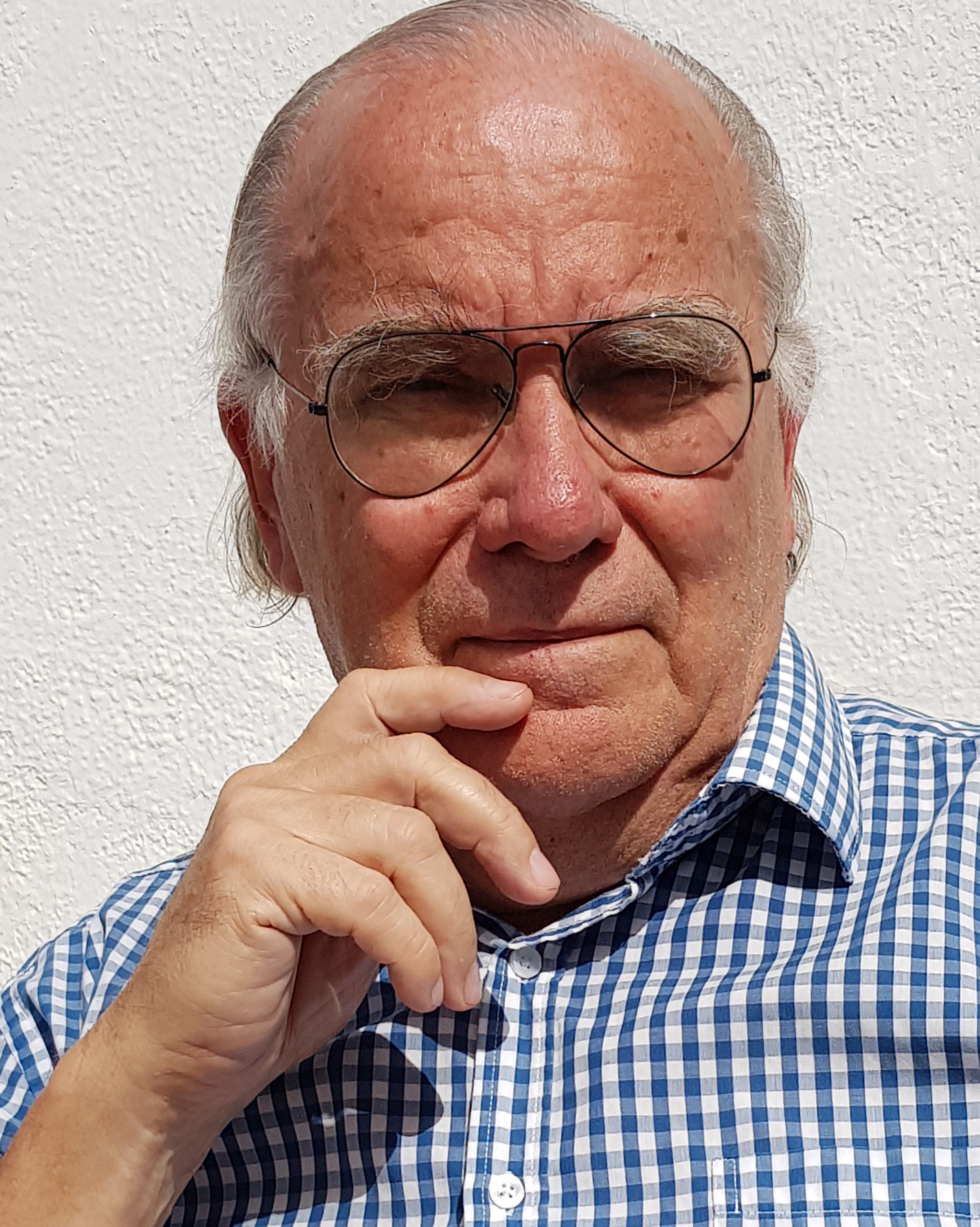
- Born: 25 October 1943; Turku, Finland
- Occupation: Architect
- Practice: Esa Piironen Architects

Esa Erkki Piironen (born 25 October 1943 in Turku) is a Finnish architect. He studied architecture at the Helsinki University of Technology, graduating in 1970. He continued his studies in architecture and urban design at North Carolina State University in Raleigh, North Carolina, where he received a Master of Architecture degree in 1972. He worked as a teaching assistant at the Helsinki University of Technology from 1972 to 1981 and was awarded a Licentiate of Technology degree in 1978. From 2012, he served as a visiting professor at the School of Art and Design of Guangdong University of Technology.

== Architectural career ==
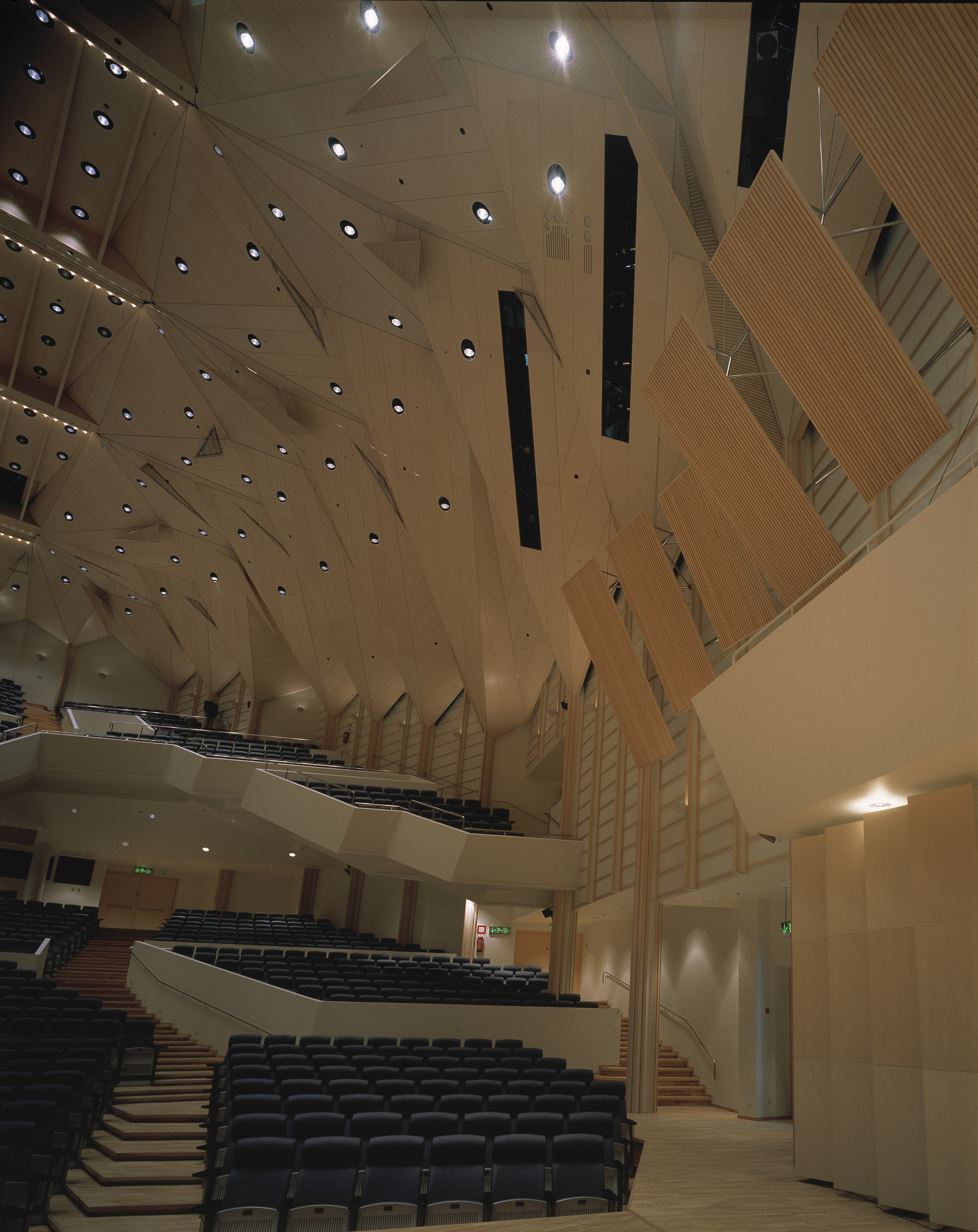
Tampere Hall

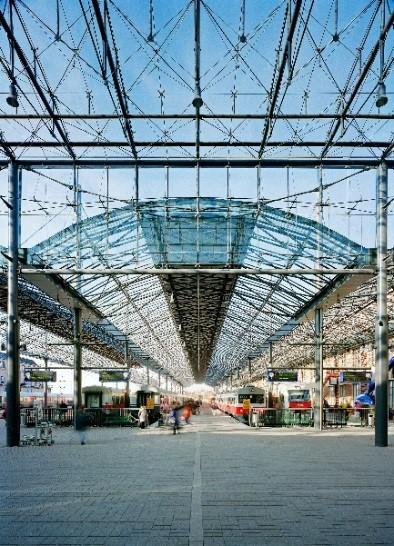
Helsinki railway station, platform roofing

During the study years Esa Piironen worked at the Architectural Office of Pekka Pitkänen in Turku 1959-1969 as a helping assistant for instance designing the Chapel of Holy Cross. Esa Piironen started private practice in 1966 with Mikko Pulkkinen in Turku. They designed mostly small private houses around Turku until 1971. In 1970 Esa Piironen established a new office called Suunnittelutoimisto G4 with Ola Laiho, Esko Miettinen and Juhani Pallasmaa. They designed sign systems for Helsinki Metro and State Railways and other institutes until 1985. In 1978 Esa Piironen established a new office with Sakari Aartelo. Their main work is Tampere Hall (a concert and congress hall for 2000 persons) based on a 1st prize competition entry. Tampere Hall was completed in 1990.

The office of Esa Piironen Architects was established in 1990. The firm has completed a wide variety of projects from small scale street furniture design to large scale urban design. Many realized projects are based on winning public competition entries. Esa Piironen Architects are working mostly with state and city municipalities but also with private companies and individuals. The firm has always practised environmentally responsible architecture. The practice has been characterised by a constant commitment to architecture based on humanism. One of the main works is Helsinki Central Station Platform Roofing (2001) based on an international competition entry.

In 2007 Esa Piironen started cooperation with ALA Architects. Their main works are Aalto University (Otaniemi) metro station and Keilaniemi metro station, which were completed in 2017.

The works of Esa Piironen Architects have been published in many distinguished architectural magazines around the world.

Esa Piironen has lectured on various subjects related to urban design, architecture, environmental design, graphic design, exhibition design, environmental psychology in Finland and abroad. In 2012 he was appointed as a visiting professor at Guangdong University of Technology School of Art and Design.

== Works ==
A selection of works by Esa Piironen:

- Private House, Söörmarkku, 1966
- Private swimming hall, Turku, 1967, P+P (demolished)
- Villa Suojaranta, Merimasku 1968
- Villa Vainiola, Aura, 1970
- Villa Björköholmen, Pargas, annex, 1974
- Pyhäjoki church, competition entry 1975
- Helsinki metro, sign system, G4,1970–82
- Finnish State Railways, sign system, G4, 1976–82
- Kumpulan University Area, competition entry, A+P, 197
- Pori music - and congress center, competition entry, A+P, 1981
- Rautavaara Church 1982 A+P
- The Official Residence of the President of Finland, competition entry, 1983
- Hansasilta shopping mall and pedestrian bridge, Helsinki 1984 A+P
- Laajasalo Church, Helsinki, competition entry, 1984
- Botanical Garden and Glass House, Joensuu University 1985 A+P
- Forest Research Center, Kannus 1985 A+P
- Private House Koivikko 1985
- Kurkimäki Multipurpose Hall, Helsinki 1989 A+P
- Office building Rautio, Espoo 1990 A+P
- Tampere Hall 1990 A+P
- Viikki Triangle Cemetery, Helsinki 1990 A+P in collaboration with Leena Iisakkila
- Bus shelter, Espoo, 1992
- Kauhajoki School of Domestic Economics 1992
- Seinäjoki railway station, pedestrian tunnel and platform shelters 1993
- Hietaniemi cemetery, Helsinki, Lighting fixtures, 1993
- Luuniemi Housing Area competition entry, 1993
- Helsinki University metrostation (Kaisaniemi), platform hall, Helsinki 1995
- Pikku-Huopalahti Multipurpose Hall, Helsinki 1997
- Vuosaari metrostation 1998
- Pori railway station, pedestrian tunnel and platform shelters 1998
- Helsinki 2nd Training School, reparation and annex 1999
- Korso railway station, Vantaa 2000
- Helsinki railway station, platform roofing 2001
- Pormestari pedestrian bridge, Pori 2001
- Nöykkiölaakso school reparation and annex, Espoo 2001
- Leppävaara exchange terminal, Espoo 2002
- Noise barriers, Kannelmäki- Lassila, Helsinki, 2002
- Rautaruukki Polska Technology Center, Zyrardow 2002
- Bus route, Oulunkylä-Viikki, Helsinki, 2003
- Mikael Agricola Church, renovation, Helsinki 2004
- Aviapolis pedestrian bridge, Vantaa 2004
- Koivukylä railway station, Vantaa 2004
- Hiekkaharju railway station, Vantaa 2004
- Kallio Municipal Offices, renovation, Helsinki 2004
- Mikkola School, Vantaa 2005
- Haarajoki railway station, Järvenpää 2006
- Mäntsälä railway station 2006
- Ruukki Factory, Kiev, Ukraina 2008
- Ruukki Factory Bolintin Deal, Romania 2008
- Leppävaara Church, renovation, Espoo 2009
- Kouvola railway station, platform shelters and lifts 2010
- Treehouse, Björköholmen, Pargas, 2011-
- Tampere Hall renovation and annex 2017
- Keilaniemi metrostation, Espoo 2017 ALA+ESA
- Aalto University metrostation (Otaniemi), Espoo 2017 ALA+ESA

== Architectural competitions ==
1st prizes:

- Pyhäjoki Church 1975
- Kumpula University Area, Helsinki 1978 A+P
- Rautavaara Church 1979 A+P
- Tampere Hall 1983 A+P
- Laajasalo Church, Helsinki A+P 1984
- Viikki Triangle Cemetery, Helsinki A+P 1990
- Luuniemi Housing Area, Iisalmi 1995
- Helsinki Railway Station platform roofing 1995
- Pori Railway station, platform shelters and pedestrian tunnel 1996
- Pormestari pedestrian bridge, Pori 2000
- Mestaritunneli, highway tunnel, Espoo 2005

Other prizes, purchases and honorary mentions:

- Lounaisrannikko Terraced Houses, Espoo, 3rd prize with others, 1968
- Puolivälinkangas Church, Oulu, competition entry, 2nd prize 1971
- Tampere Library, competition entry, purchase, A+P, 1978
- Kouvola Cultural Center, competition entry, 2nd prize A+P, 1979
- Iisalmi Library- and Cultural Centre, competition entry, 3rd prize, A+P, 1980
- Pori Music- and Congress Hall, competition entry, 3rd prize, A+P, 1981
- Rauma Town Hall, competition entry, purchase, A+P, 1981
- Järvenpää Administrative and Cultural Centre, competition entry, purchase, A+P, 1981
- The Official Residence of the President of Finland, Helsinki, 2nd prize A+P, 1983
- Lamminpää cemetery and chapel, Tampere, invited competition, honorary mention. A+P, 1986
- Tikkurila Orthodox Church, Vantaa, competition entry, 3rd prize, 1991
- Bus Shelter, Espoo, competition entry, 2nd prize, 1992
- Västra Eriksberg, Housing Area, Gothenburg, competition entry honorary mention, with others, 1992
- A type-kiosk for Helsinki, competition entry, 3rd prize, 1994
- Embassy of Finland, Canberra, competition entry, honorary mention, 1997

== Publications ==
- Carlo Bassi 1772-1840, AtlasArt 2023
- Healing Architecture, China Electric Power Press, China 2021
- Architecture and Materials, China Electric Power Press, China 2021
- Thoughts on Architecture, China Electric Power Press, Kiina, ed. together with Fang Hai ja Dongfang Tan, 2018
- On Architecture, China Electric Power Press, Kiina, ed. together with Fang Hai ja Dongfang Tan, 2014
- Helsingin metron opastusjärjestelmän suunnitteluohje, HKL, 2008
- Steel Visions, TRY, Avain, Helsinki, ed. 2006
- Arkkitehtuurista/On Architecture, Avain, Helsinki, 2006
- Small Houses in Finland, Rakennustieto Oy, Helsinki, 2004
- Monografia: Esa Piironen, Architect, China Architecture and Building Press, 2003
- Steel Images, TRY, Tianjin University Press, Kiina, 2003
- Katettu katu, HKR/Katuosasto, 2001
- Steel Images, TRY, Rakennustieto Oy, Helsinki, ed. 2001
- Teräs julkisessa rakentamisessa, TRY, Rakennustieto Oy, Helsinki, 1998, together with Risto Saarni
- Kaupunkirata Helsinki-Huopalahti-Leppävaara, asemasuunnittelun ohjeet, Ratahallintokeskus, Helsinki, 1997
- Tikkurilan joukkoliikennepysäkki, Vantaa, C5:1996, 1996
- Helsingin keskustan terminaalien matkustajaninformaation kehittäminen, HKL et al., Helsinki, 1995
- Helsinki Vantaan lentoaseman opastesuunnittelun perusteet, Helsinki, together with Viisikko Oy, 1994
- Ulkomainonta kaupunkikuvassa, FEPE Finland, Helsinki, ed., 1983
- VR, Opastusjärjestelrnä, Helsinki, 1982
- Lars Sonck 1870–1956, Suomen rakennustaiteen museo, Helsinki, ed., 1981
- Kurkimäen korttelitalo, Esisuunnitelma, HKR, Helsinki, A+P, 1980
- Suomalaisia kytkettyjä pientaloja, TKK, Espoo, ed., 1980
- Le Corbusier: Uutta arkkitehtuuria kohti (käännös), TKK, Espoo, ed., 1979
- Matalaenergiataloja, TKK, Espoo, ed., 1978
- Ympäristöpsykologia 5, TKK, Espoo, ed., 1978
- Ympäristön havaitsemisesta ja sen mittaamisesta, TKK, Espoo, 1978
- Suomalaisia yhdenperheentaloja, TKK, Espoo, ed., 1977
- G4, imago, Helsinki, 1977
- Sports and Leisure, Helsinki, ed., 1977
- Ympäristöpsykologia 4, TKK, Espoo, ed., 1977
- Ympäristöpsykologia 3, TKK, Espoo, ed., 1976
- Suomalaisia loma-asuntoja ja saunoja, TKK, Espoo, ed., 1976
- Helsingin metron opastus- ja informaatiojärjestelmä, yleissuunnitelma, G4, 1975
- Ympäristöpsykologia 2, TKK, Espoo, ed., 1975
- Metroasemien sisustuskomponentit, Helsinki, ed., with others, 1974
- Lastentalon suunnittelun perusteet, TKK, Espoo, ed., 1974
- Loma-asunnon suunnittelun perusteet, TKK, Espoo, ed., 1974
- Ympäristöpsykologia 1, TKK, Espoo, ed., 1974
- Metro/USA, Helsingin kaupungin metrotoimisto, 1974
- TKK/A/100, Arkkitehtiosaston juhlajulkaisu, ed., 1974
- Arkkitehtuuriopas Turku, Arkkitehti-lehti, 1972
- Helsingin metron opastus- ja informaatiojärjestelmä, G4, 1972
- Kadun kalusteet, Suomen rakennustaiteen museo, Helsinki, G4, 1970
- Helsingin metron opastus- ja informaatiojärjestelmätutkimus, G4, 1970
- Tutkimus seutu- ja yleiskaavamerkinnöistä, SAFA Asemakaava- ja standardisoimislaitos, Helsinki, 1970
- Erik Bryggman 1891–1955, Turku, ed., 1967

== Quotes ==
In architecture, the spirit is more important than the material.

- Transparency enables the illusion in architecture, which is part of the essence of architecture.
- The purpose of architecture is to demonstrate the reality of gravity projected by light.
- An architectural experience arises from the interaction of all the senses and memory.

== Awards and grants ==
- ASLA Fulbright, USA 1971-72
- Lasse and Kate Björk Foundation grant 1973
- Väinö Vähäkallio grant 1975
- Greta and William Lehtinen Foundation grant 1978
- Steel Construction Award 1986 A+P
- Finland State Artist Grant 1999-2003
- Brunel Award, UK, honorary mention 2001

== Gallery of works ==
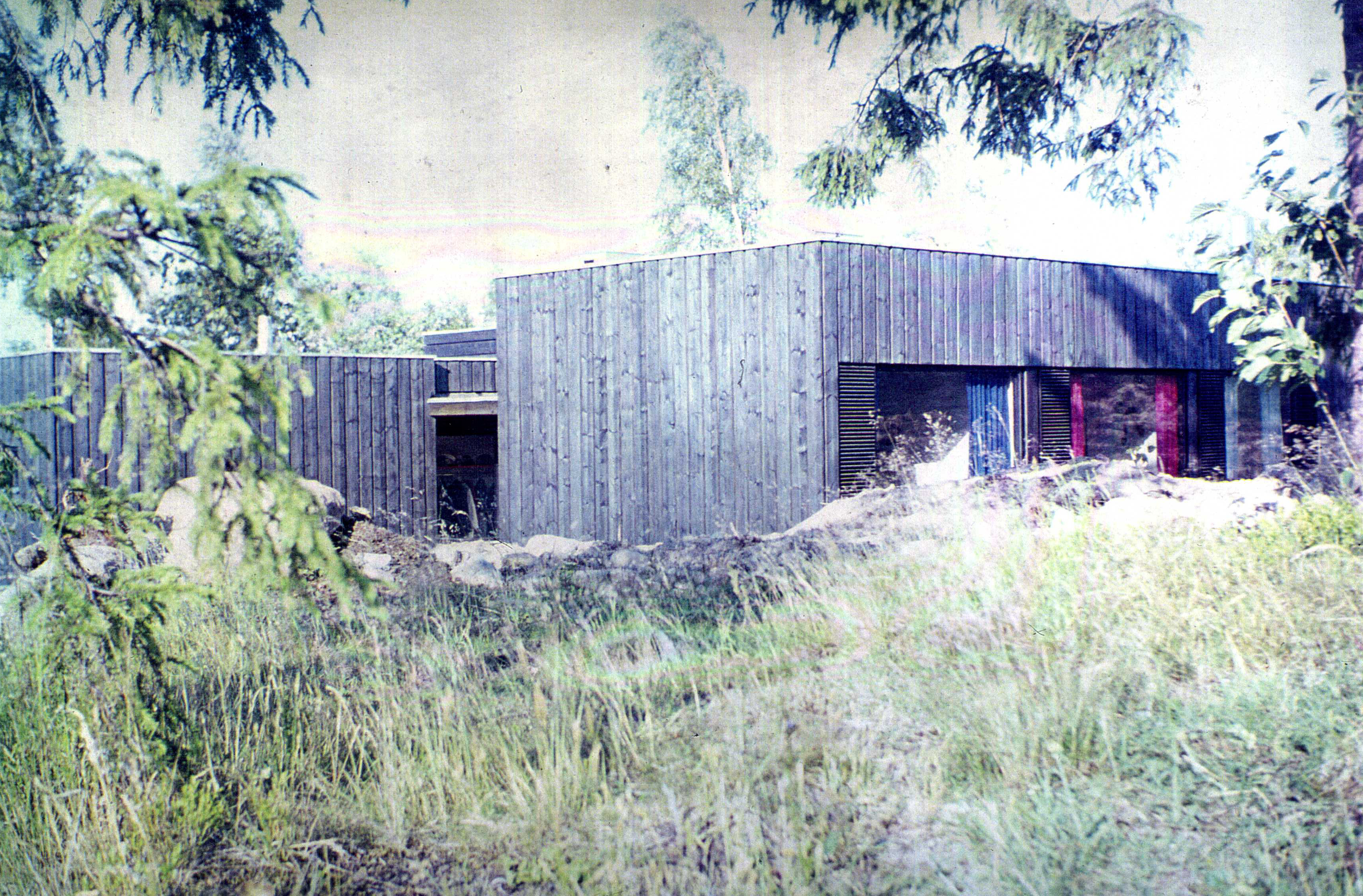
Private House, Söörmarkku, 1966

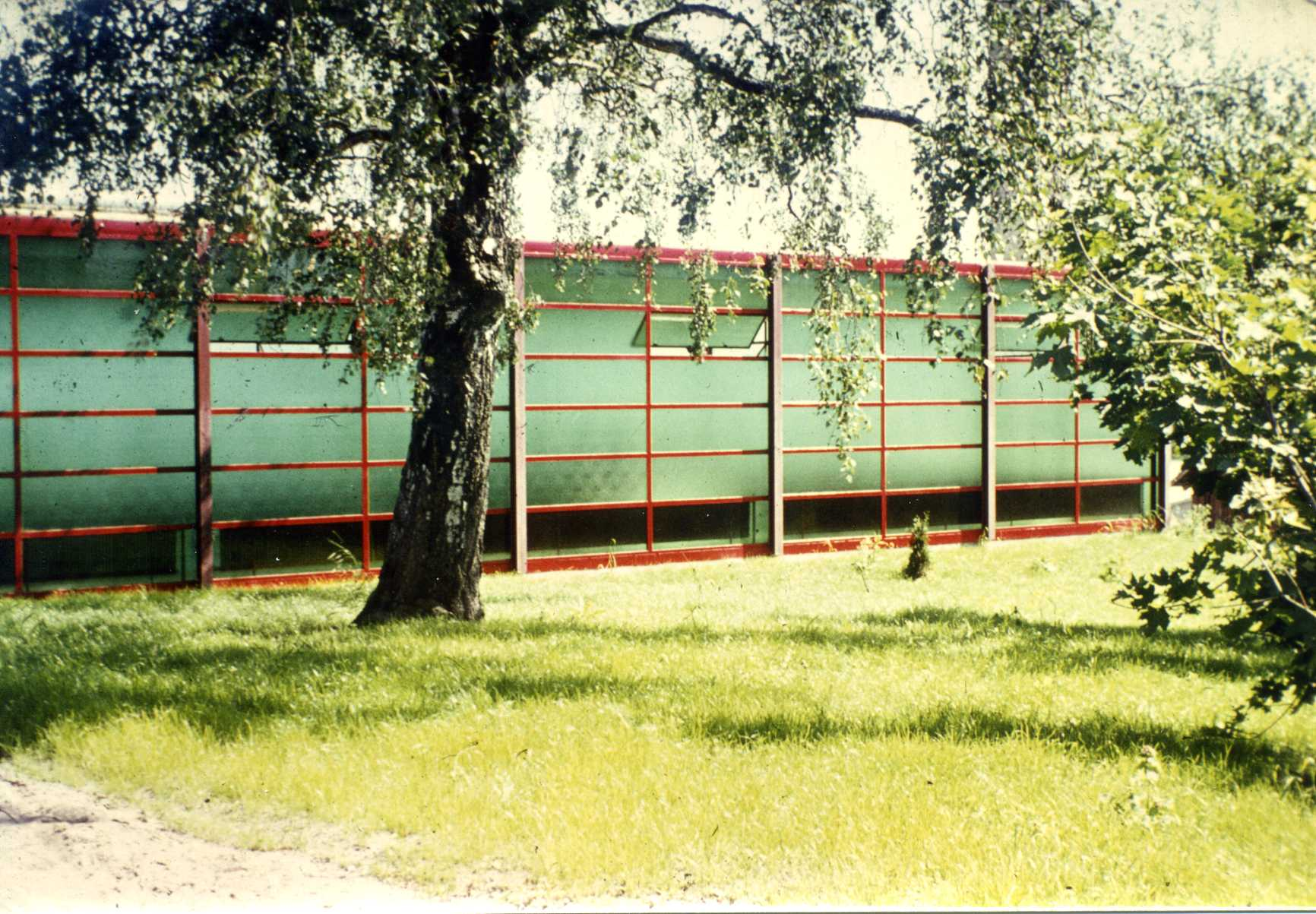
Private Swimming Hall, Turku 1967 demolished

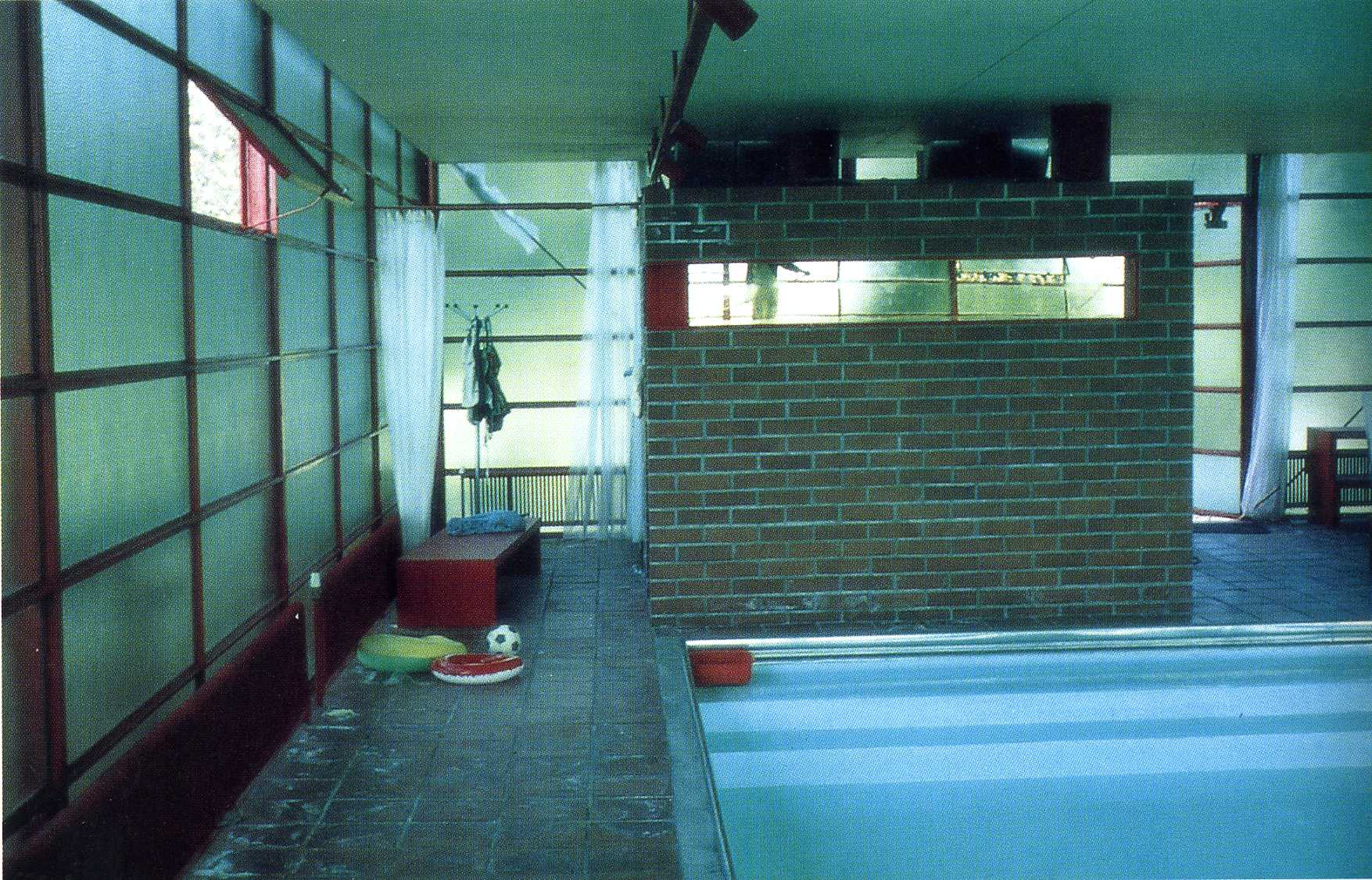
Private Swimming Hall, Turku, 1967, demolished

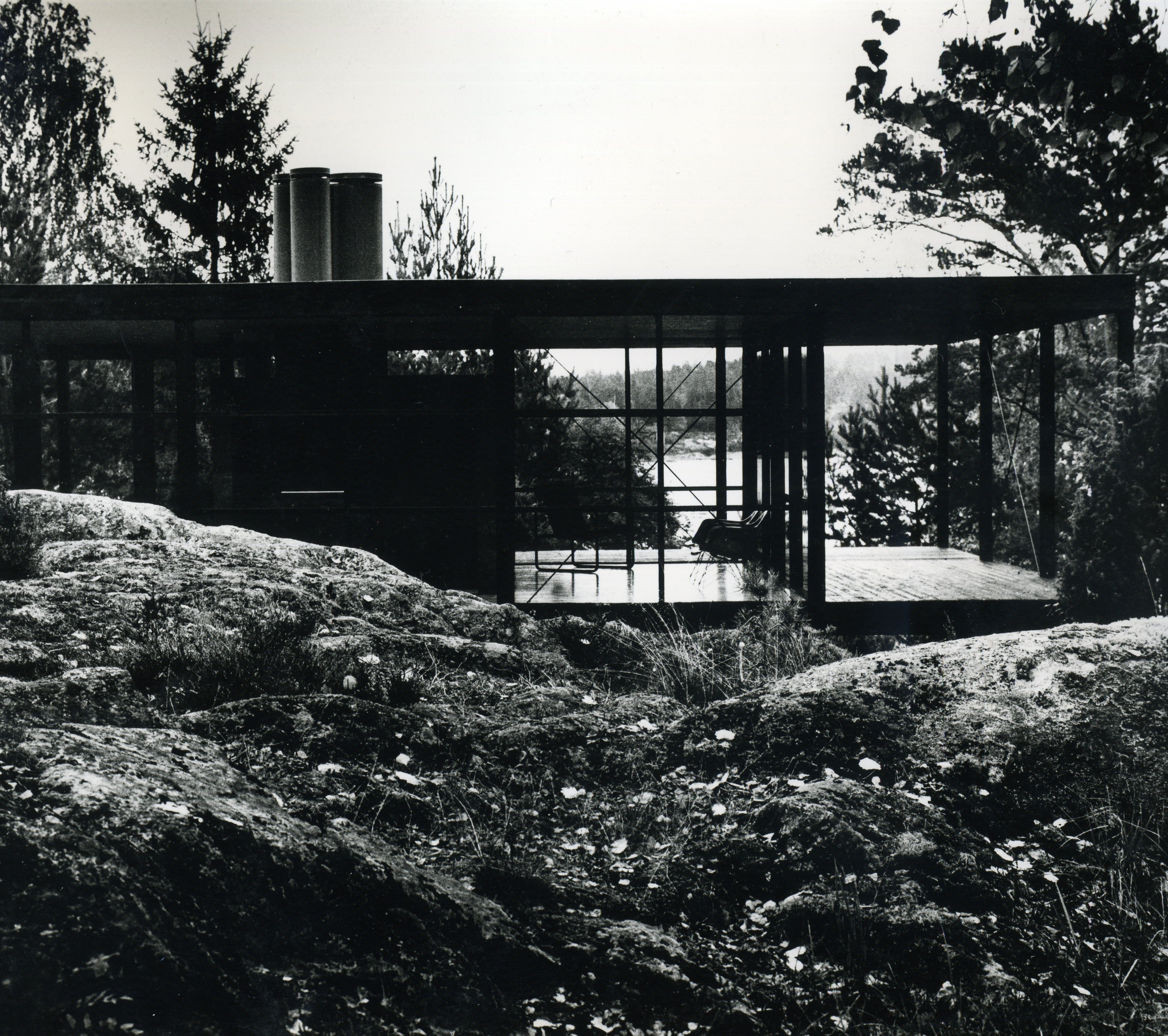
Villa Suojaranta, Merimasku, 1968

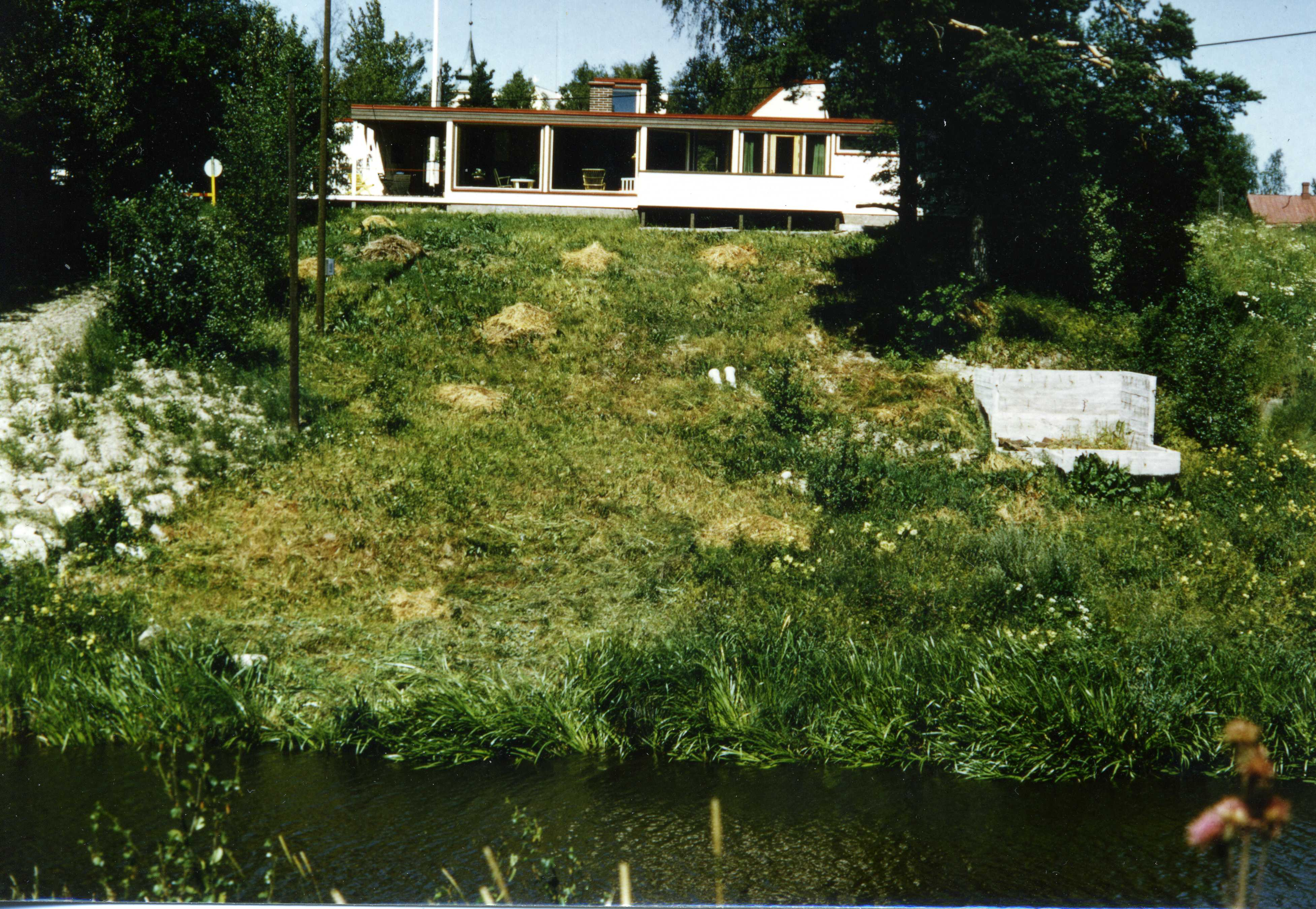
Villa Vainiola, Aura, 1970

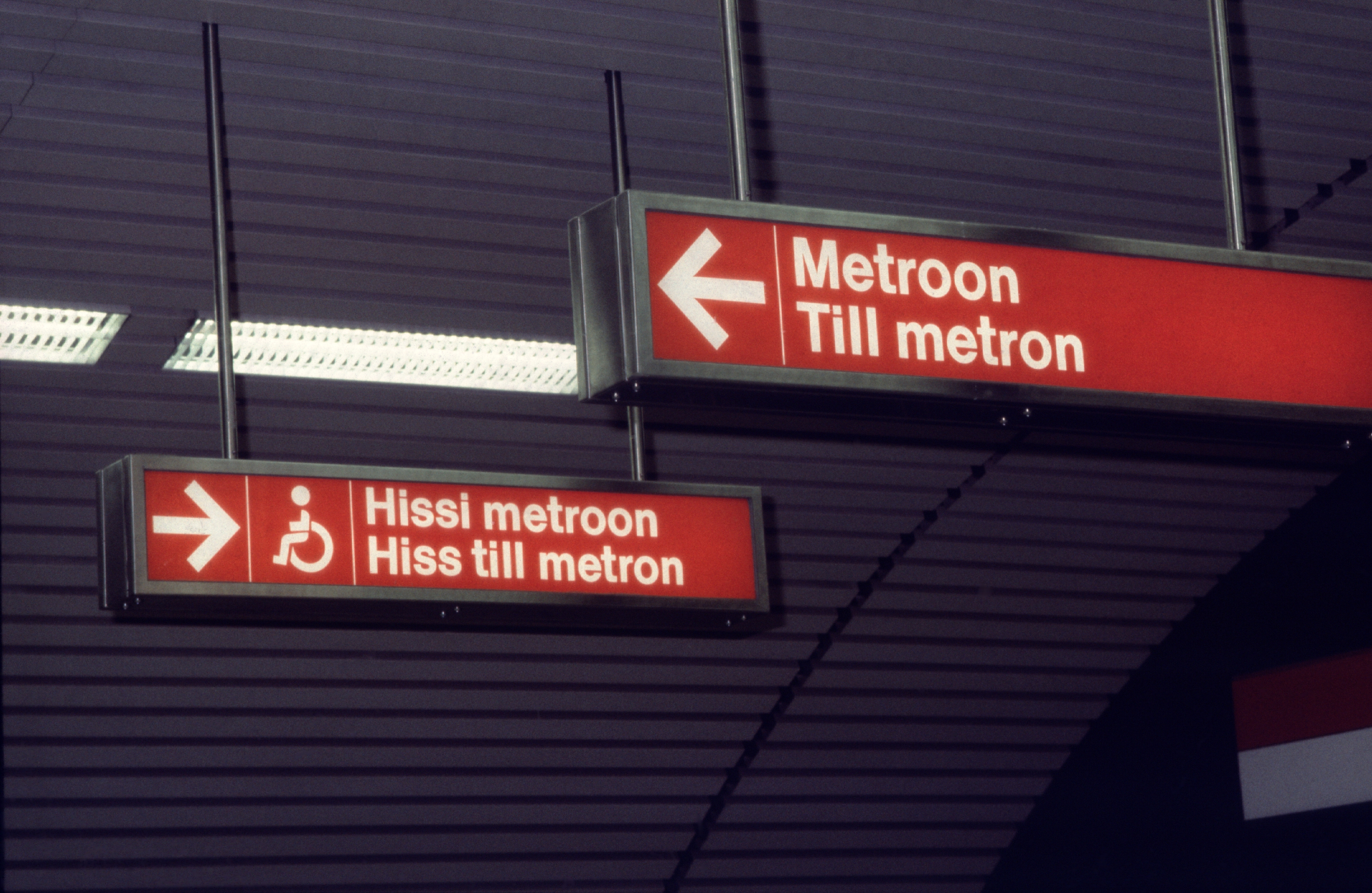
Helsinki Metro sign system 1970-82

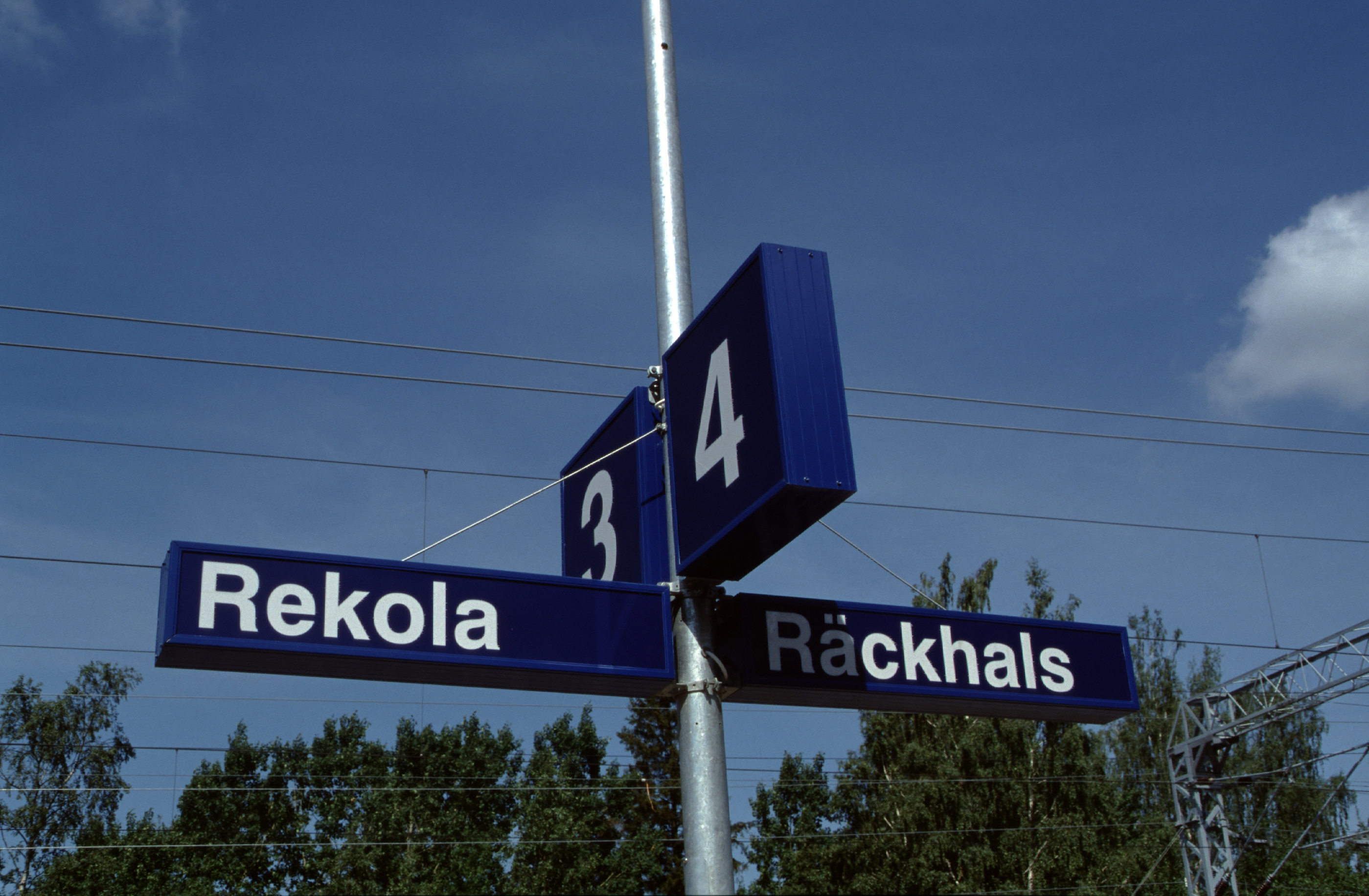
Finnish State Railways sign system, G4 1976 - 82

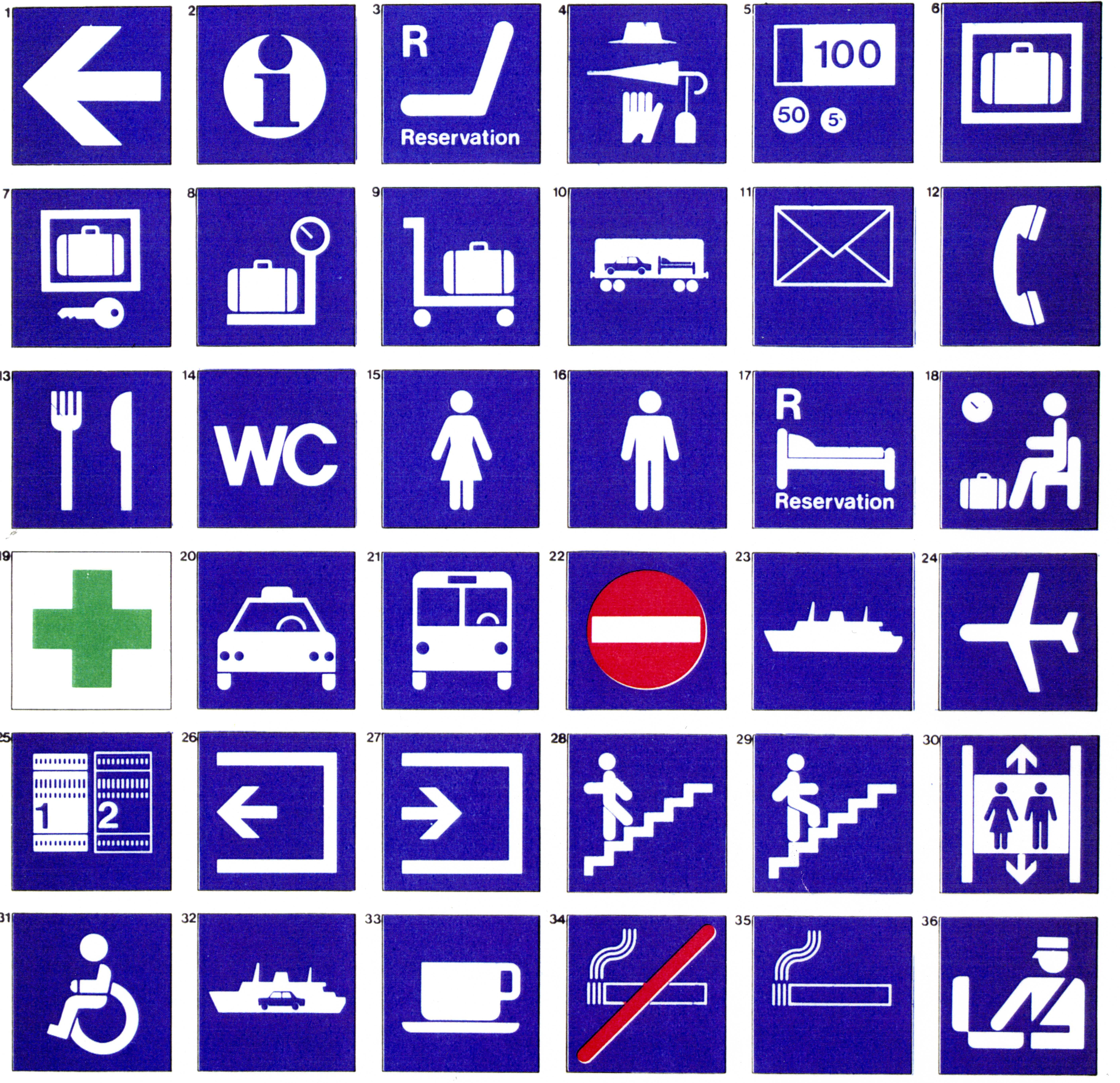
Finnish State Railways sign system, G4 1976 - 82

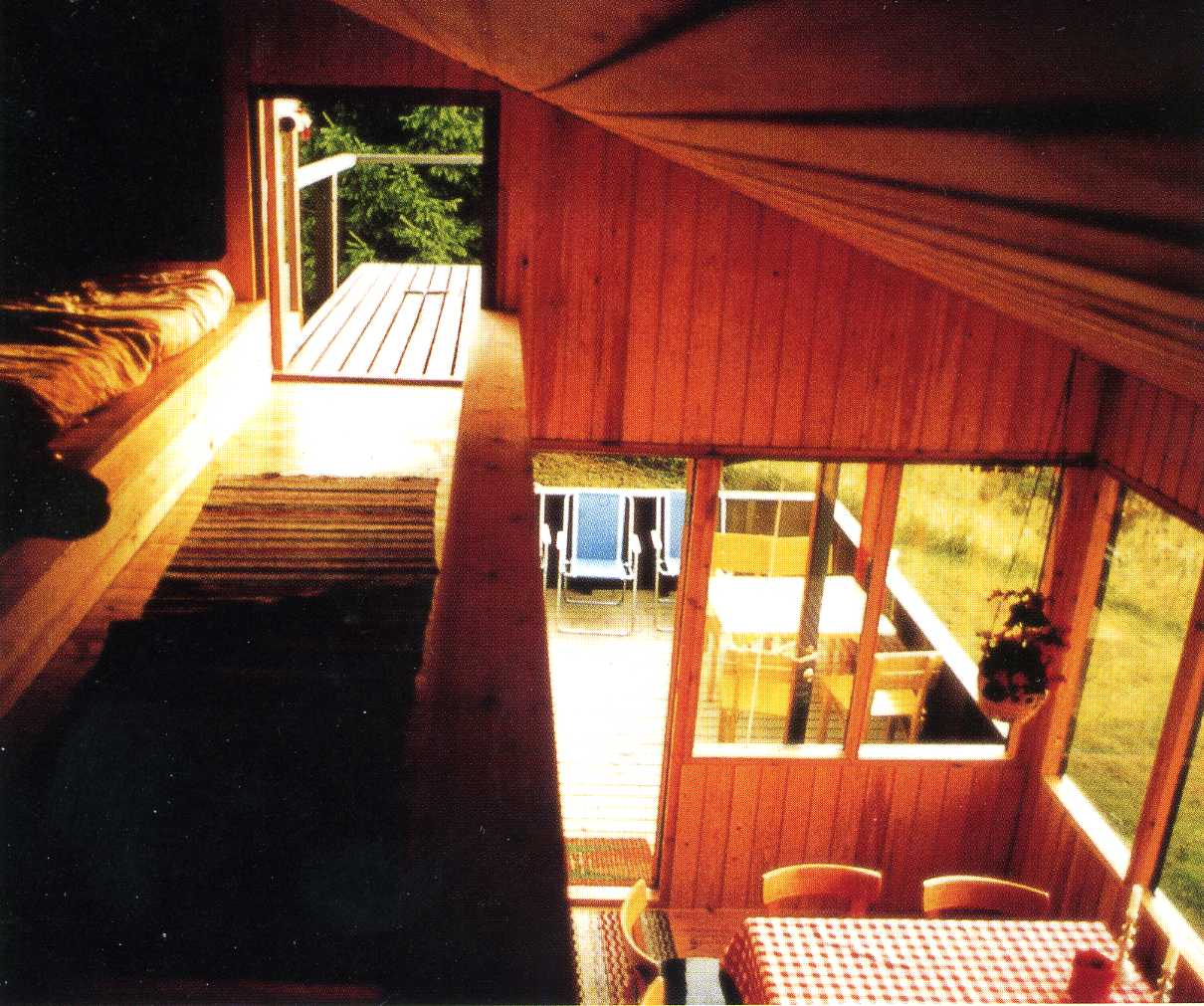
Villa Björköholmen, Pargas, annex, 1974

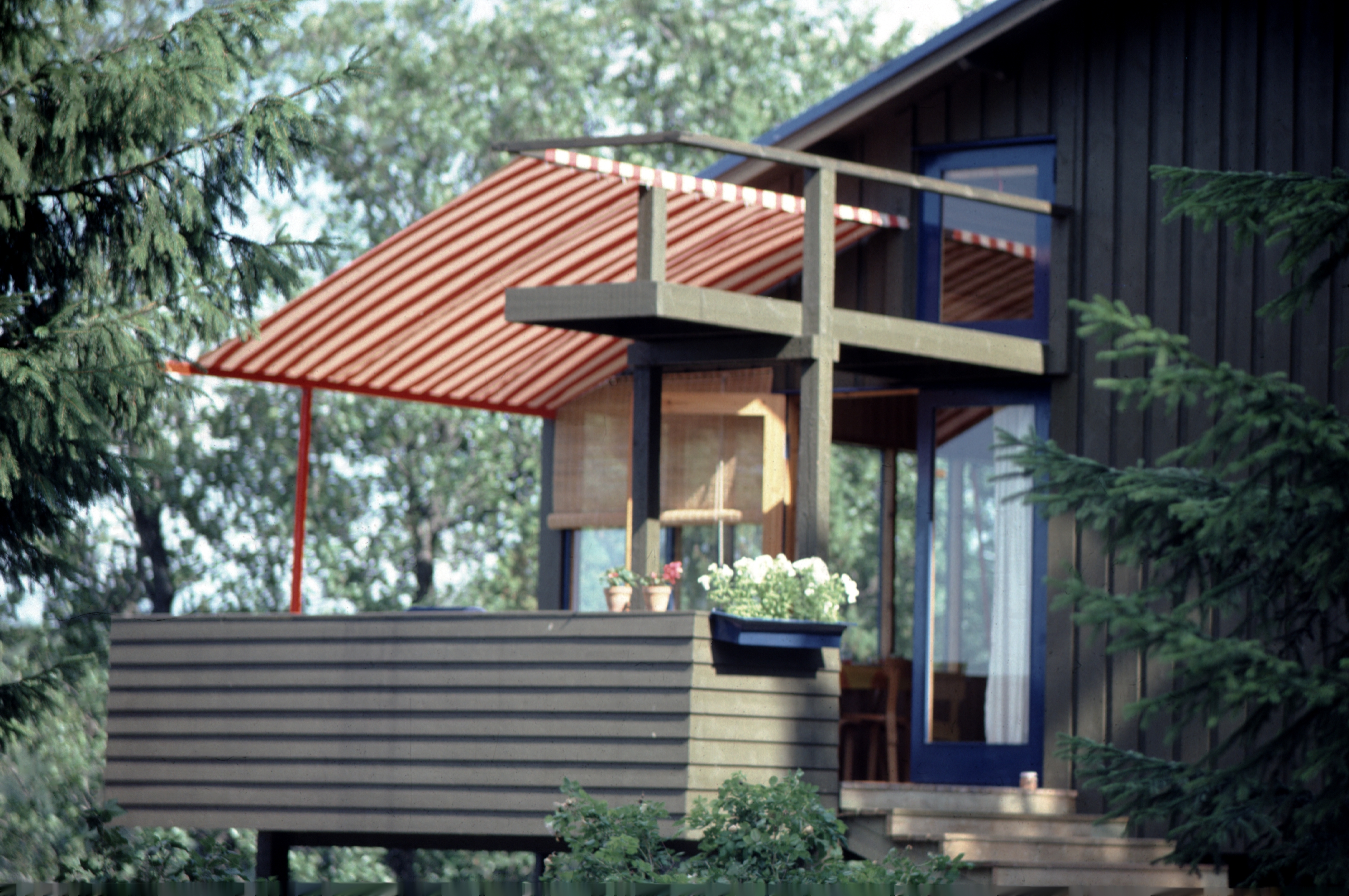
Villa Björköholmen, Pargas, annex, 1974

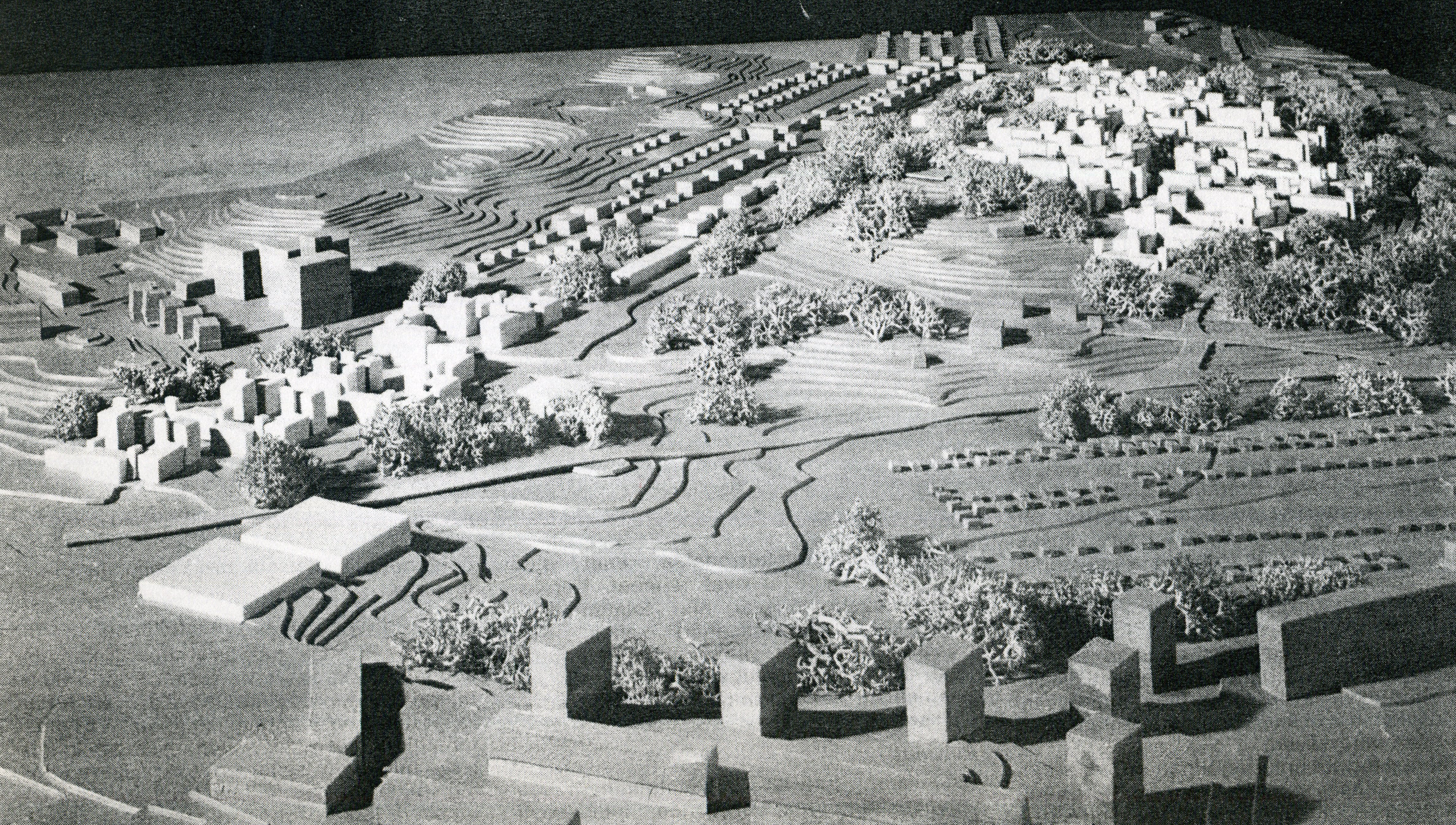
Kumpula, University Area competition entry A+P, 1978

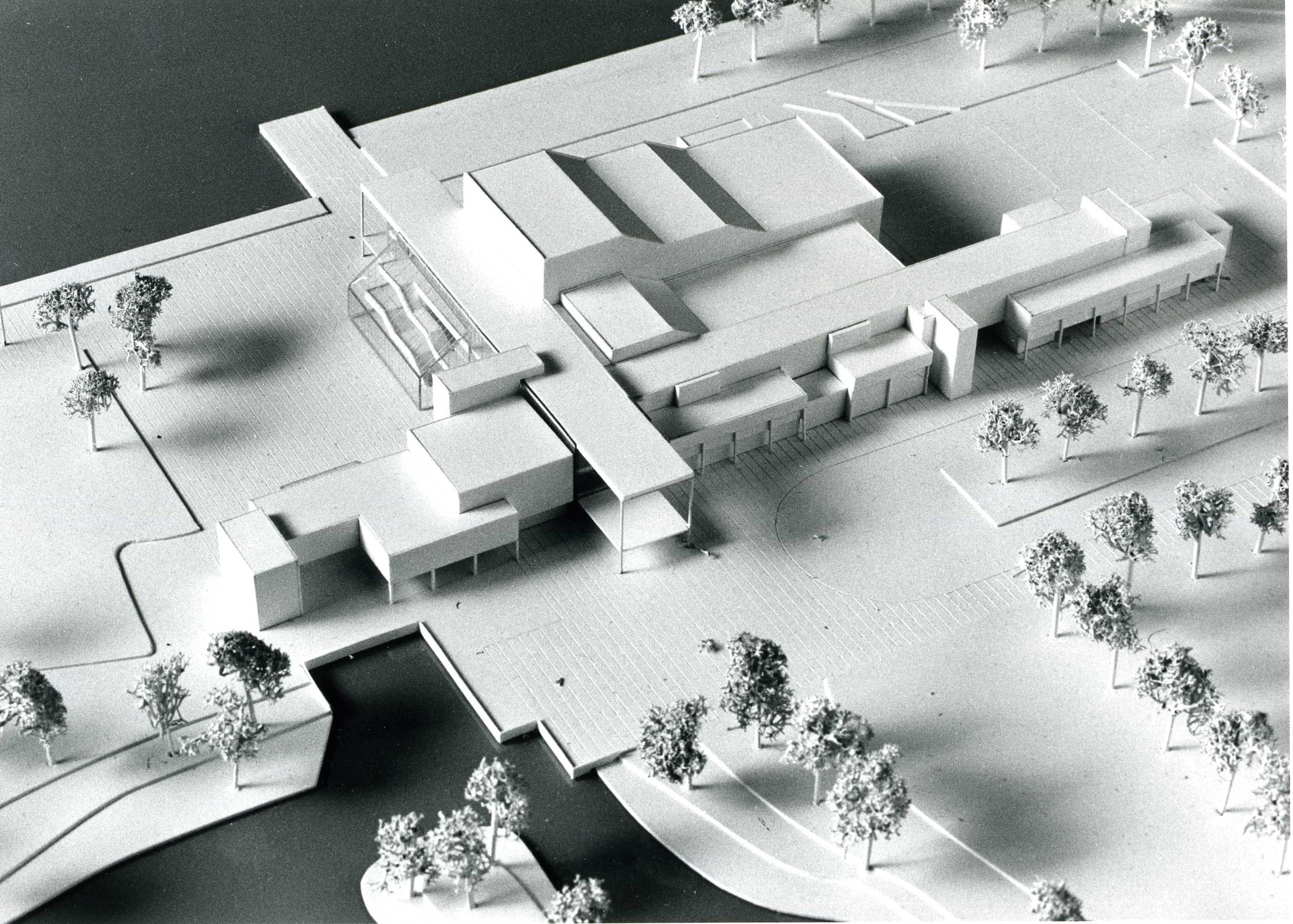
Pori Music- and congres Hall, competition entry A+P, 1981

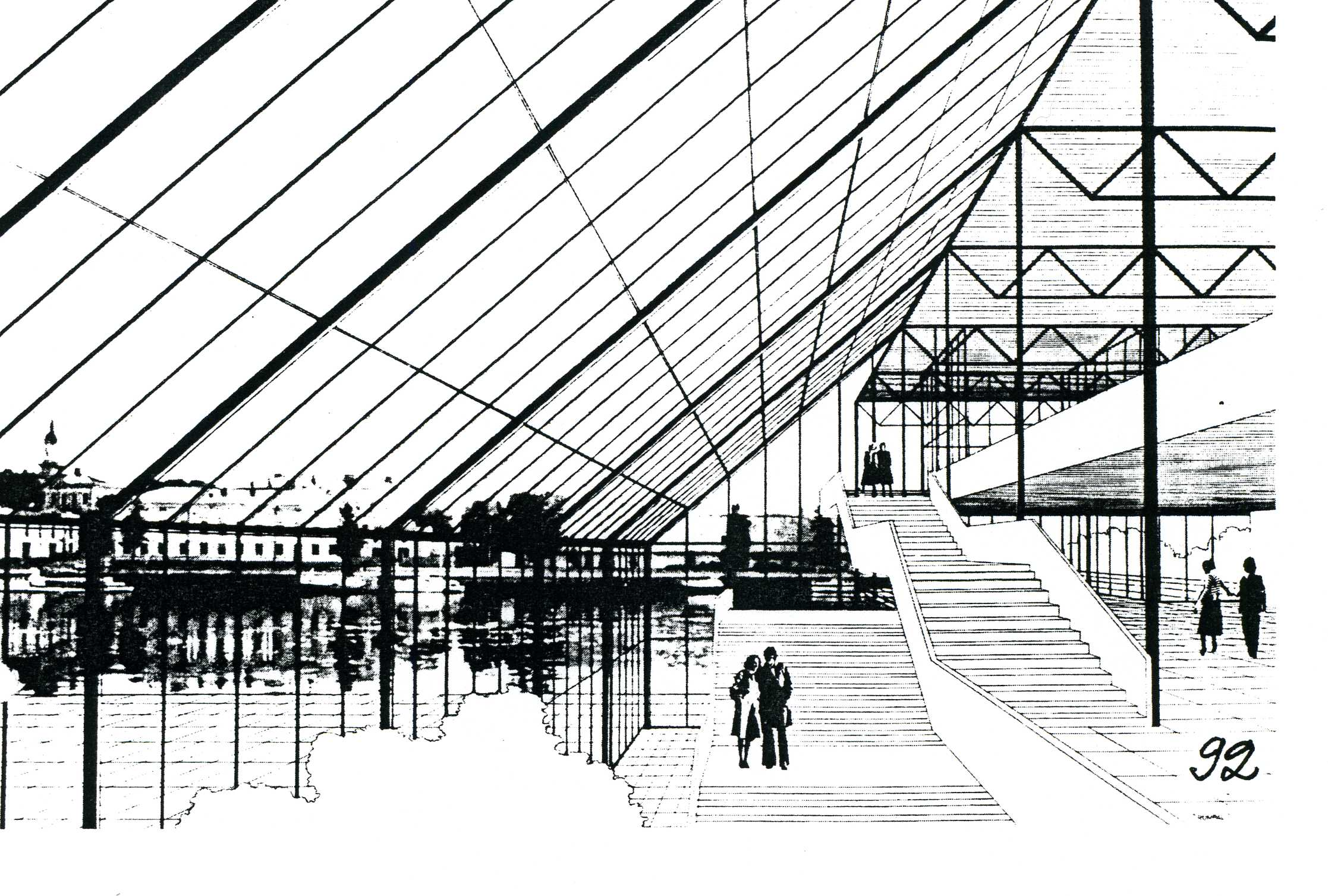
Pori Music- and congres Hall, competition entry A+P, 1981

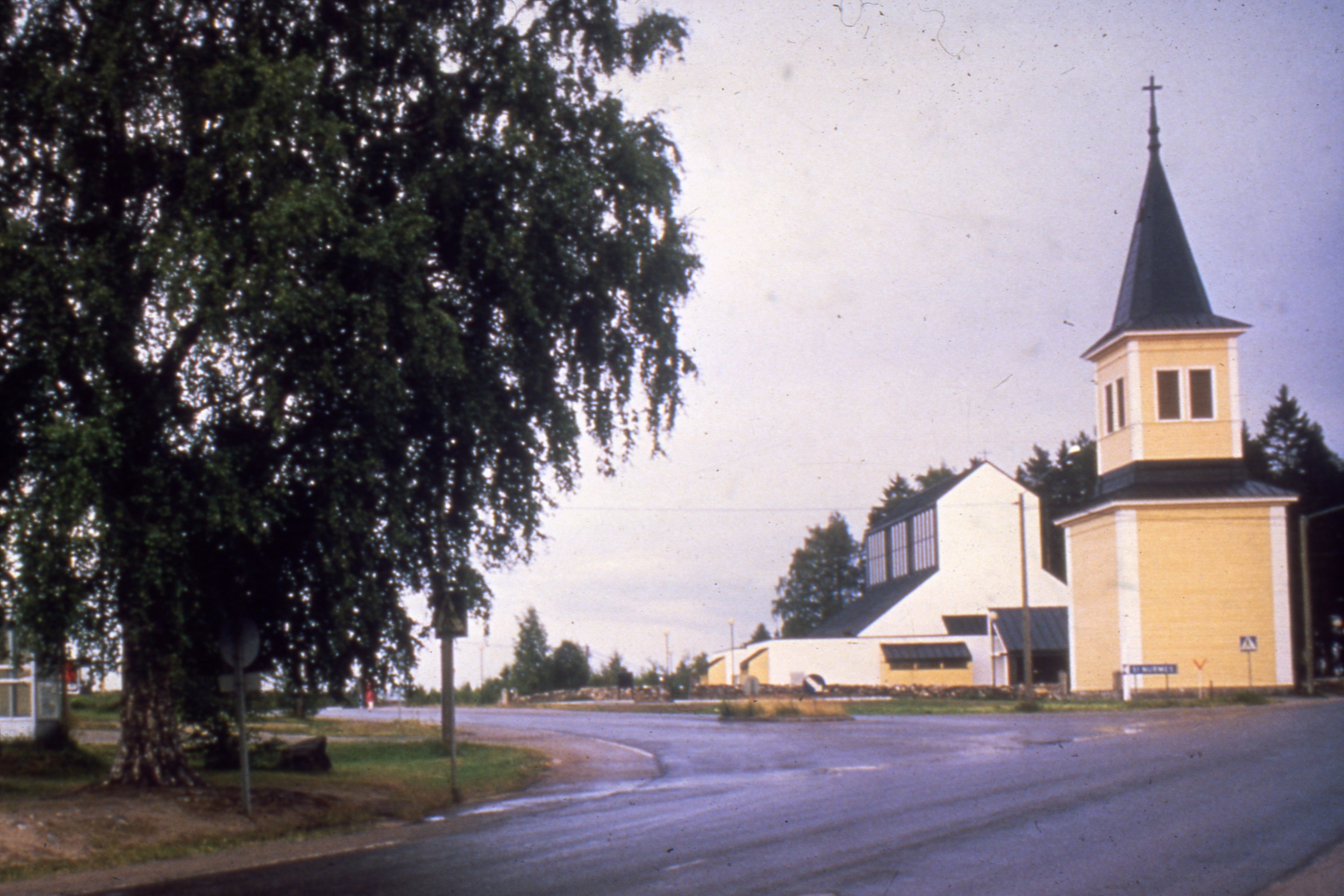
Rautavaara Church A+P, 1982

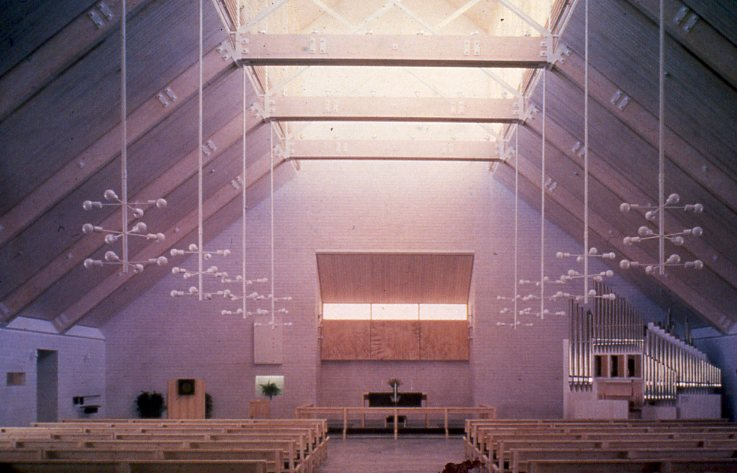
Rautavaara Church A+P, 1982

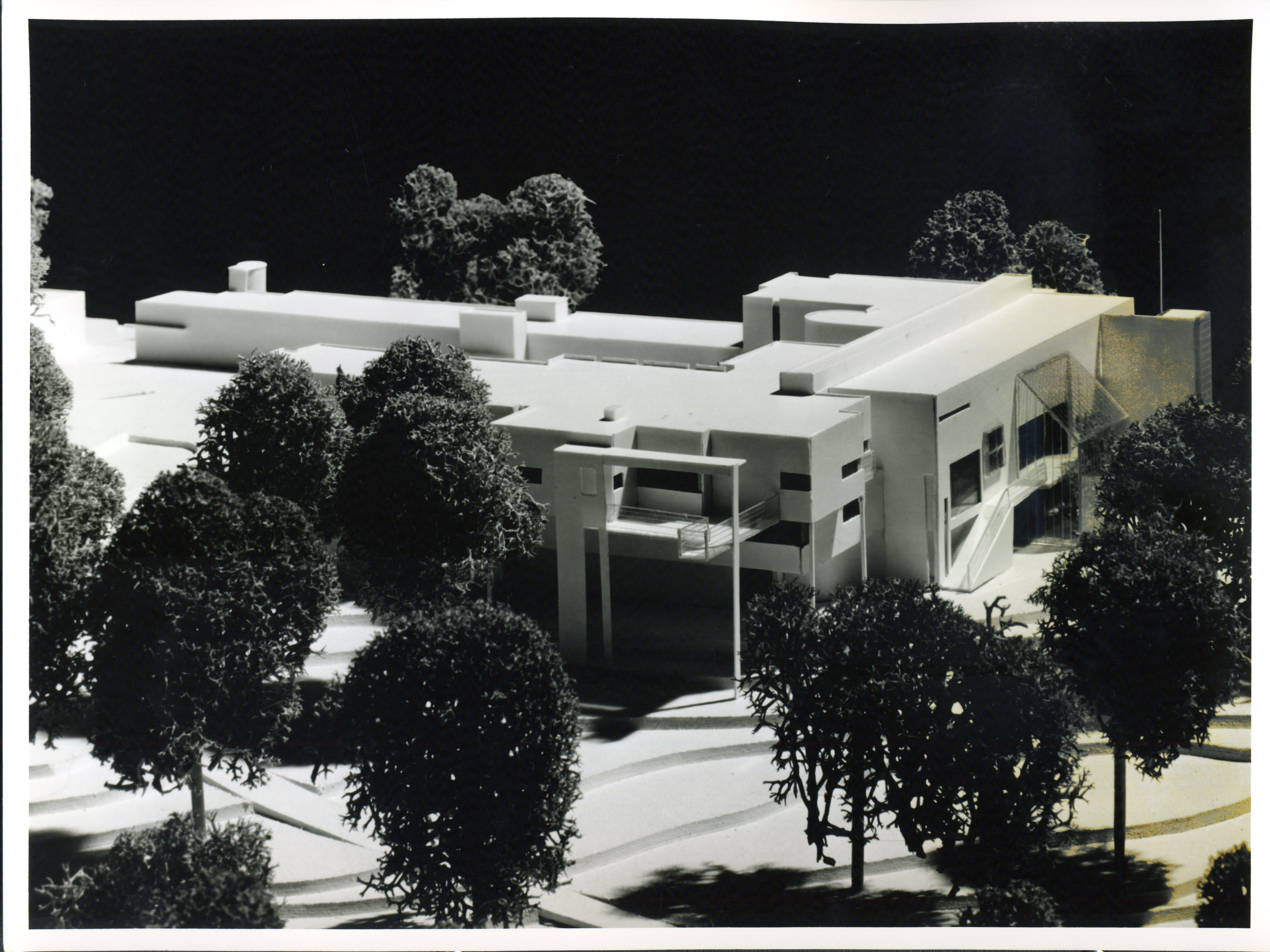
The Official Residence of the President of Finland, competition entry A+P, 1983

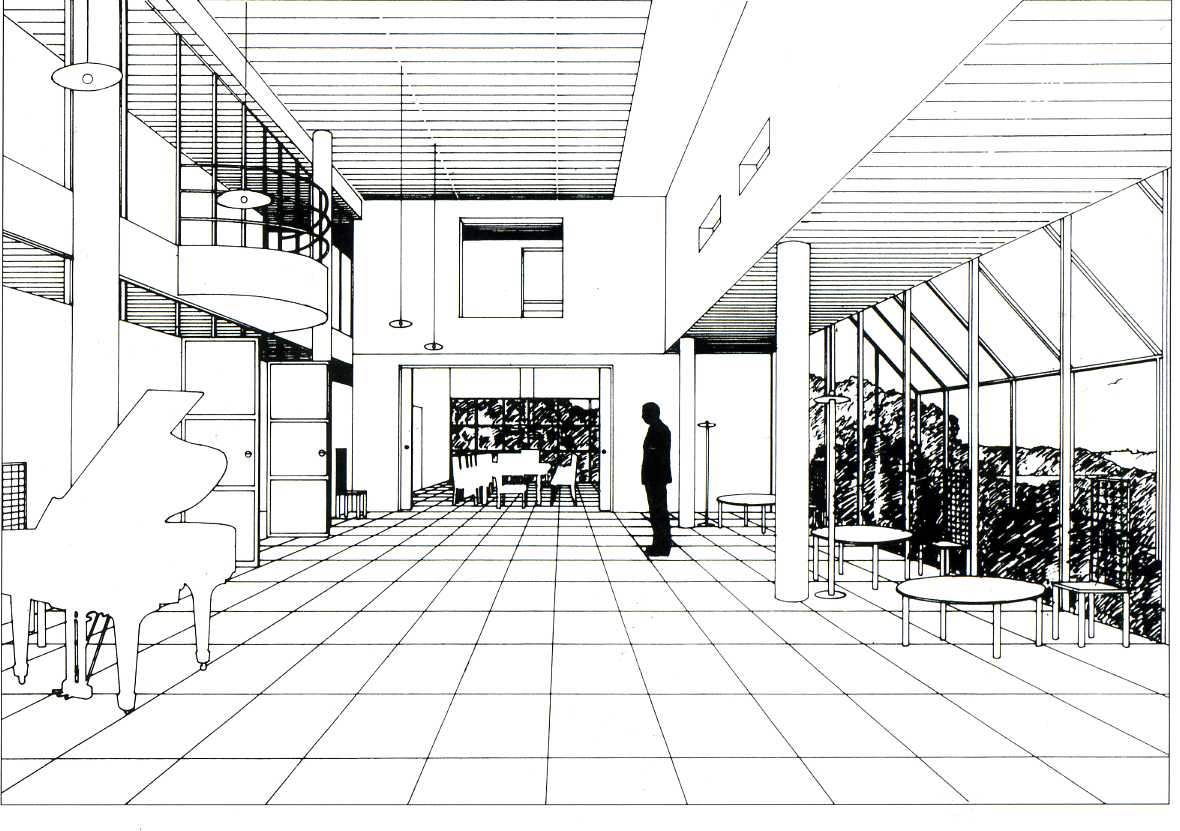
The Official Residence of the President of Finland, competition entry A+P, 1983

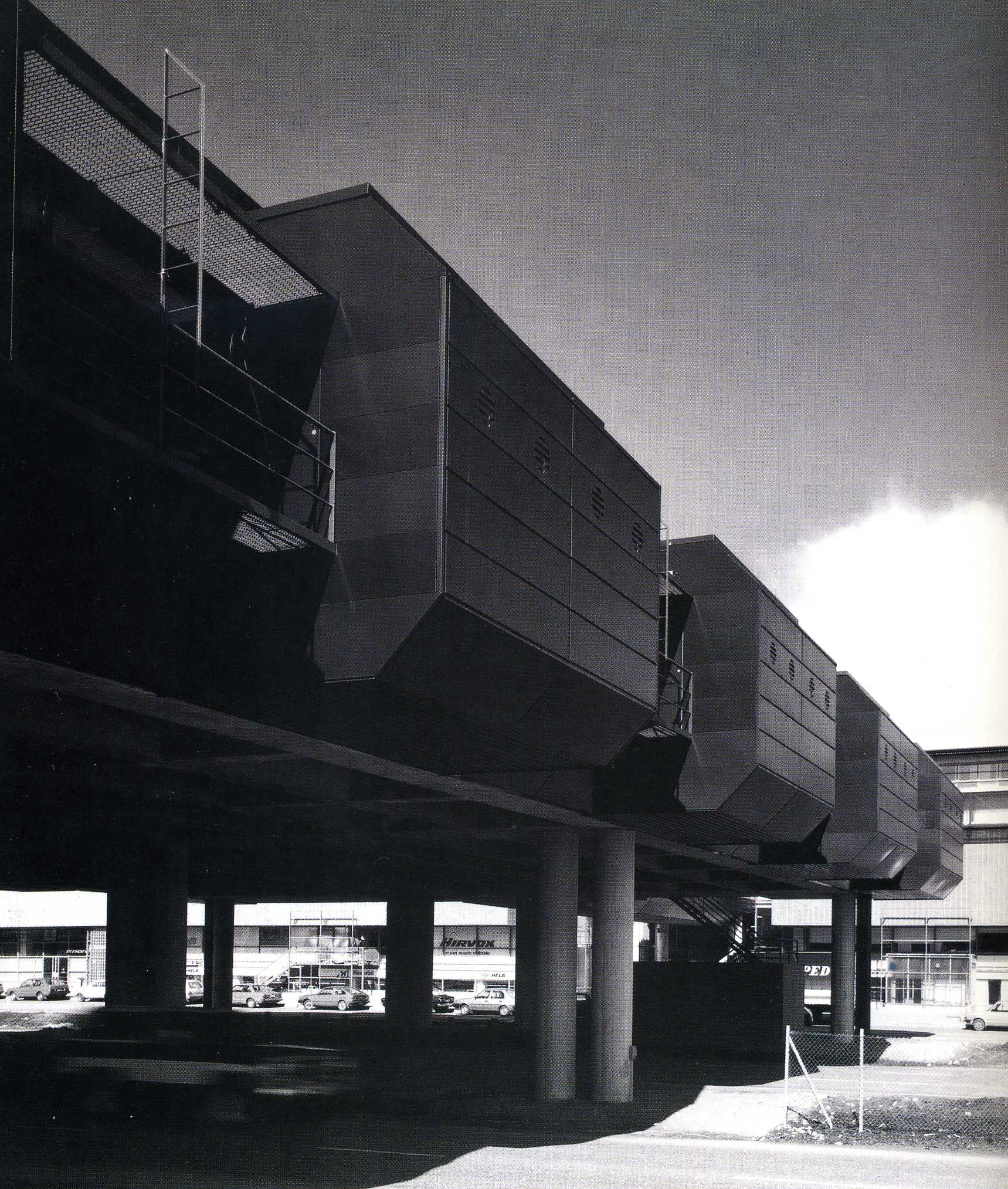
Hansasilta Shopping Mall and pedestrian bridge, Itäkeskus, Helsinki, A+P 1984

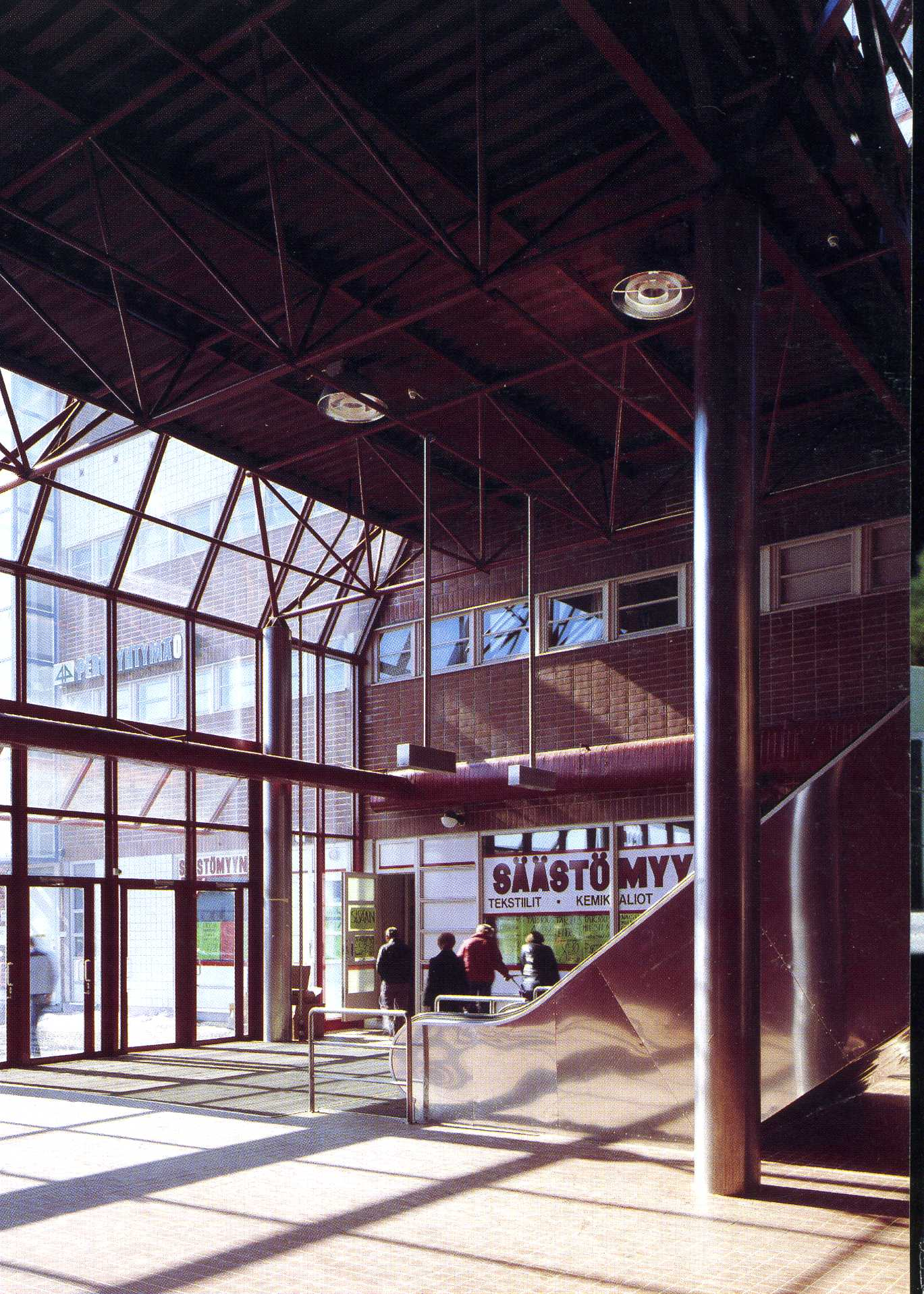
Hansasilta, Helsinki A+P, 1984

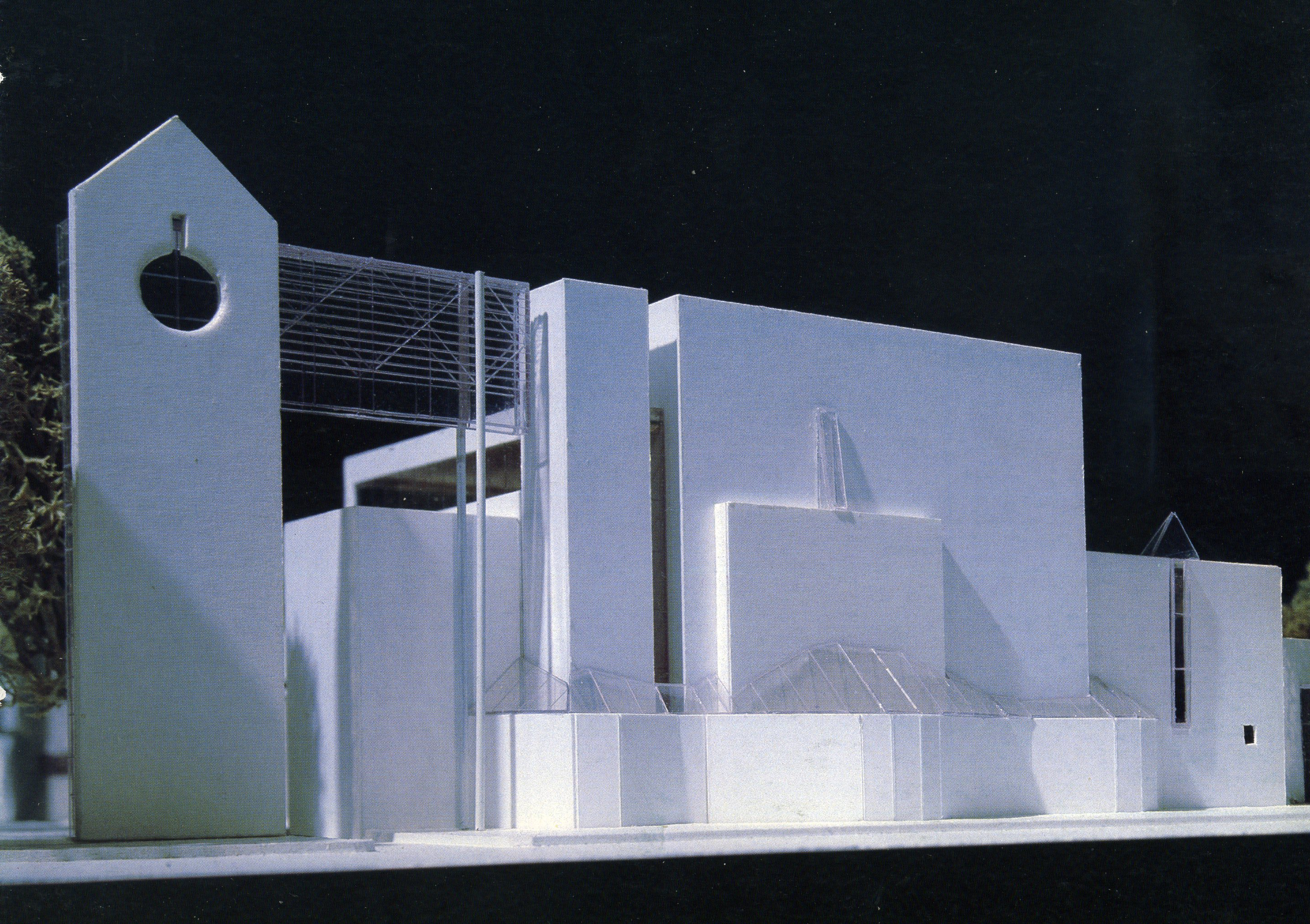
Laajasalo Church, Helsinki, competition entry A+P, 1984

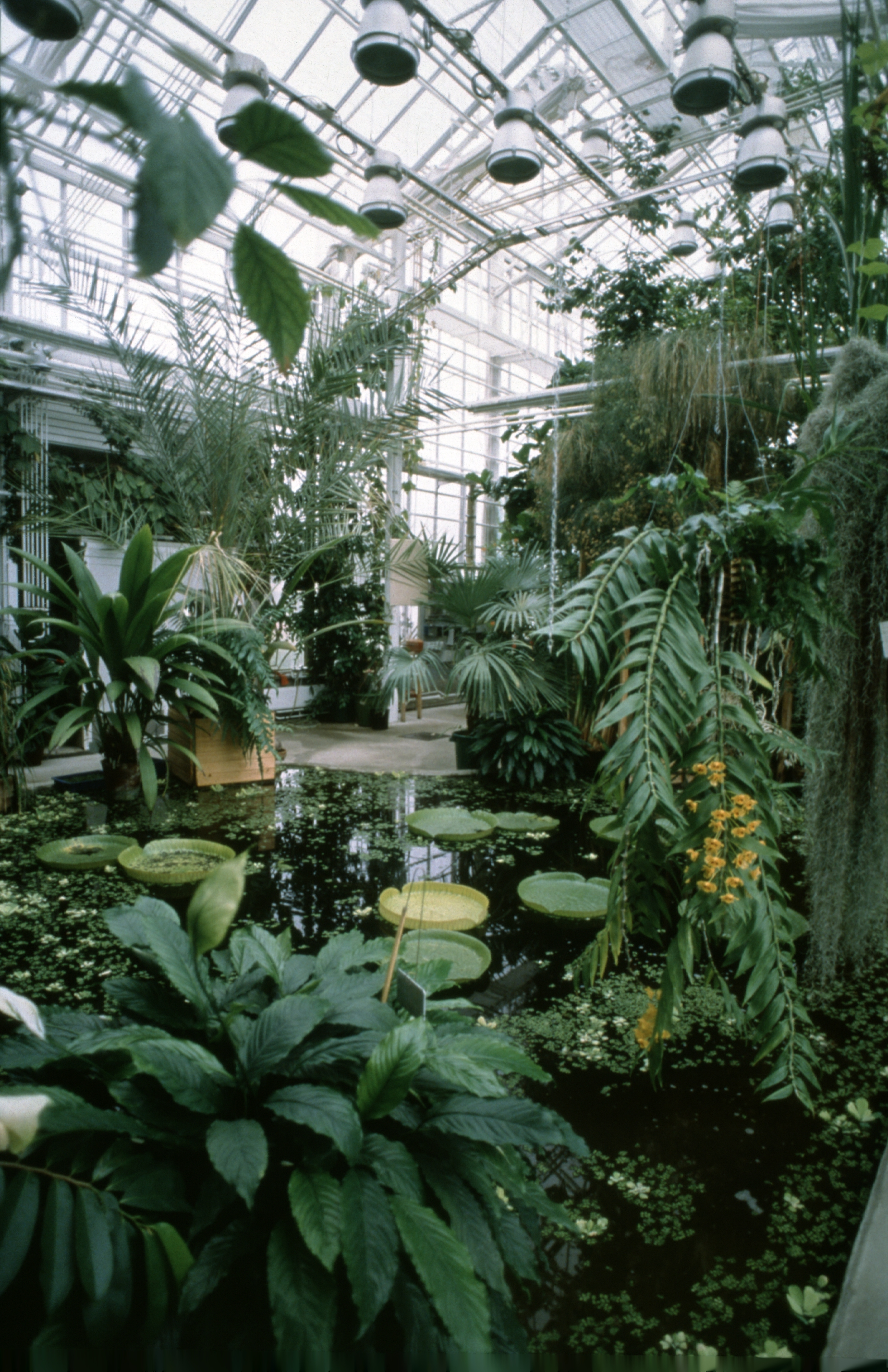
Botanical Garden and Glass House, Joensuu University, A+P 1985

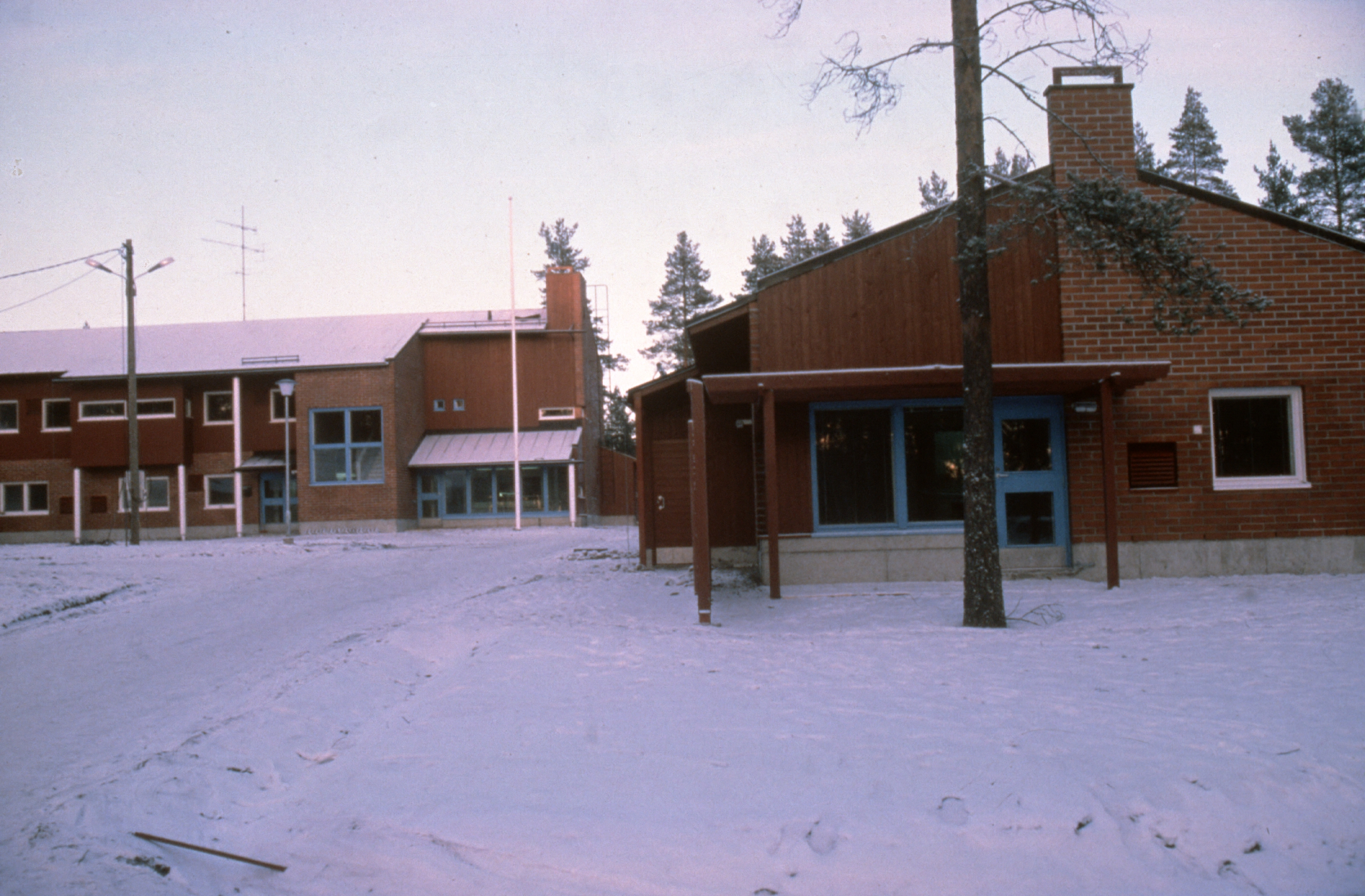
Forest Research Center, Kannus, A+P 1985

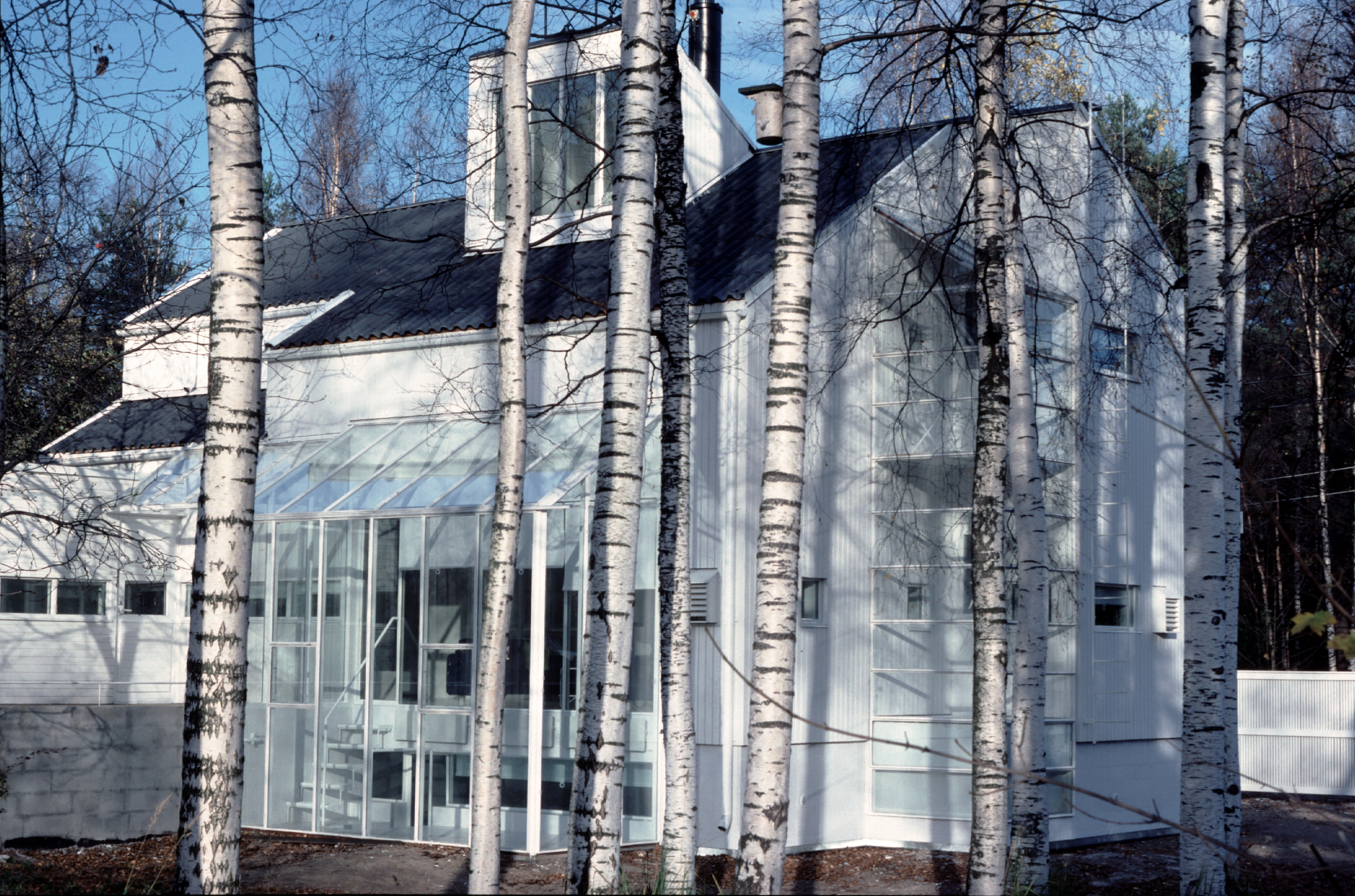
Private House Koivikko, Helsinki, 1985

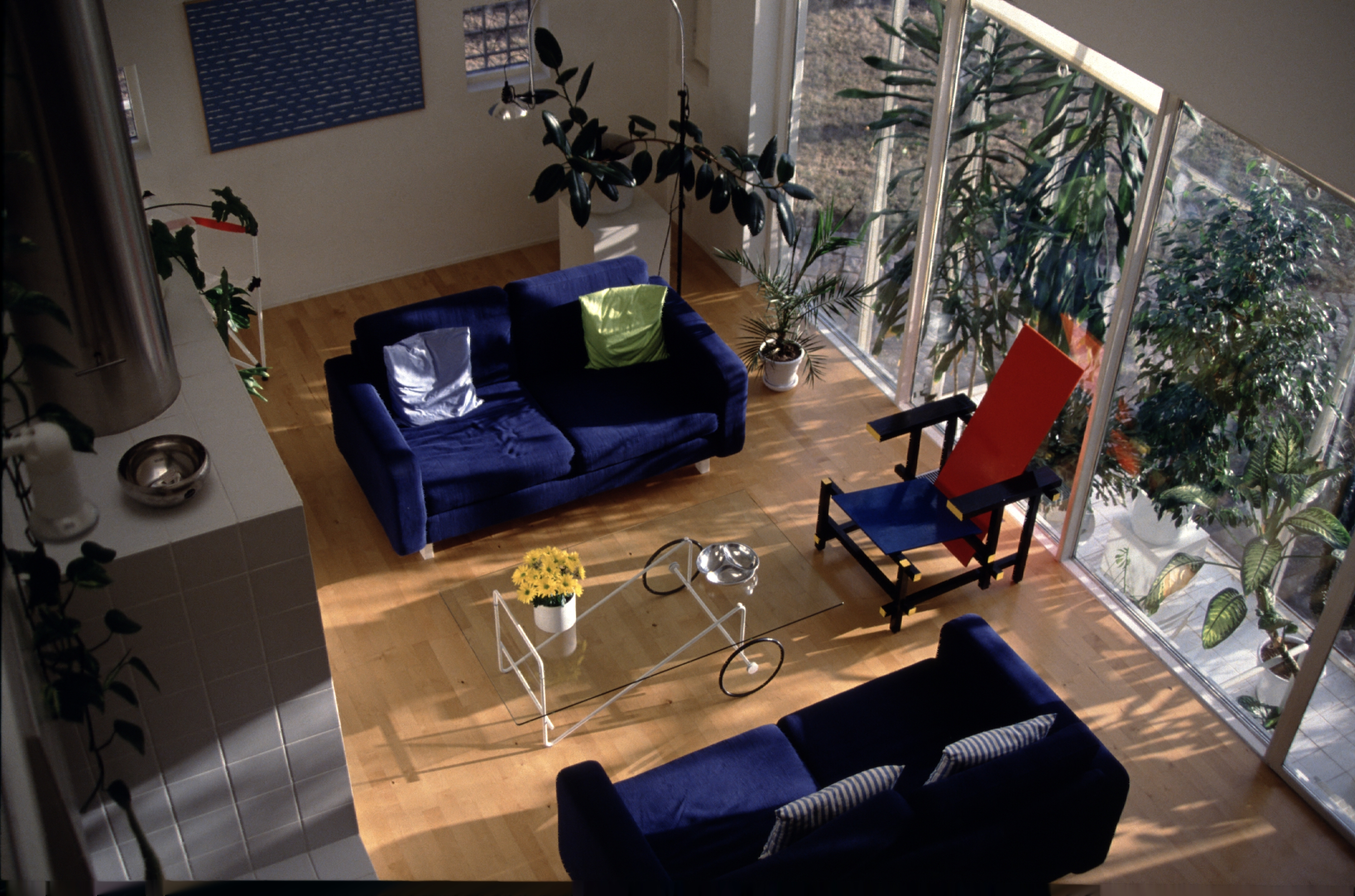
Private House Koivikko, Helsinki, 1985

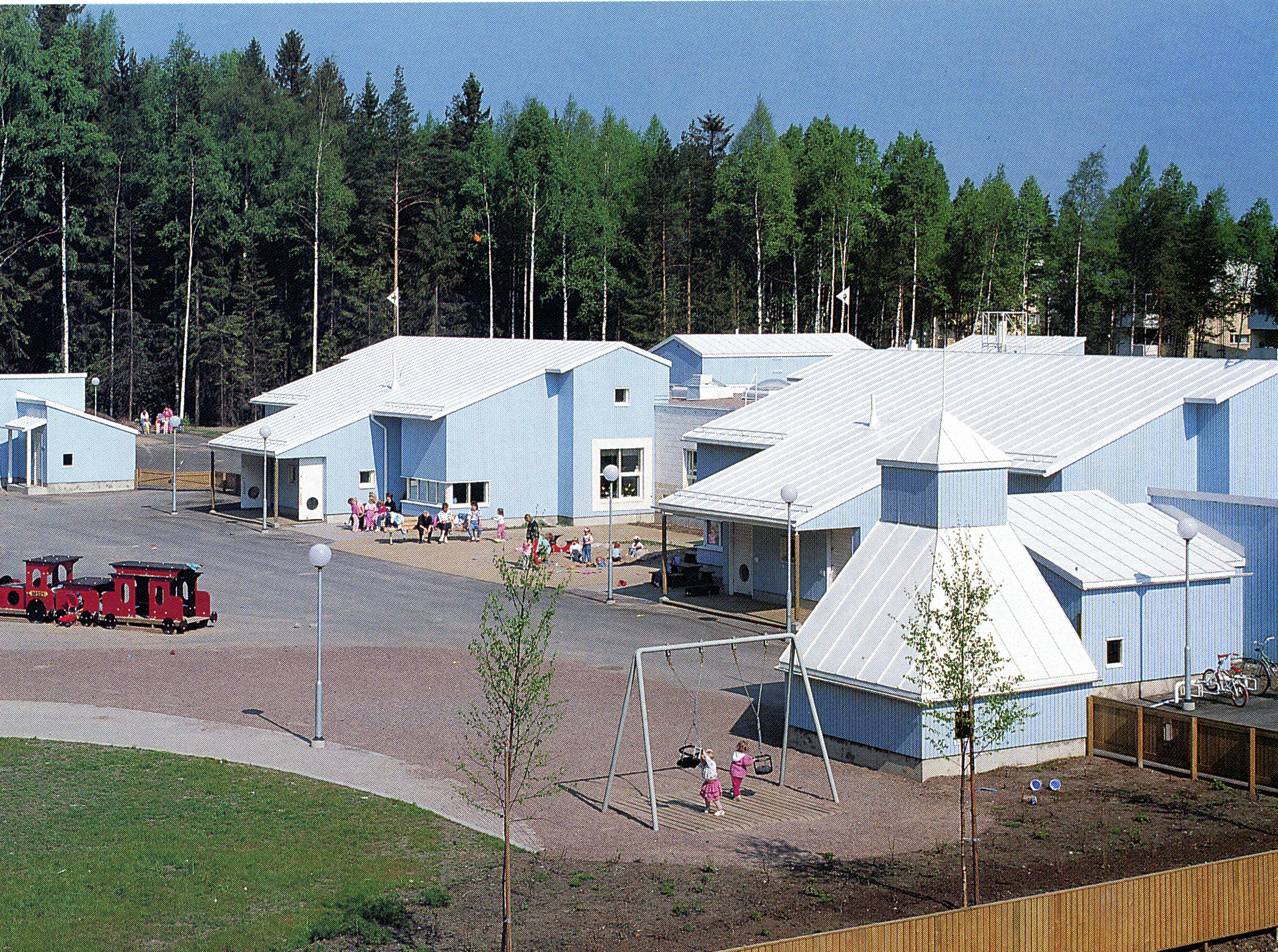
Kurkimäki Multipurpose House, Helsinki, A+P1989

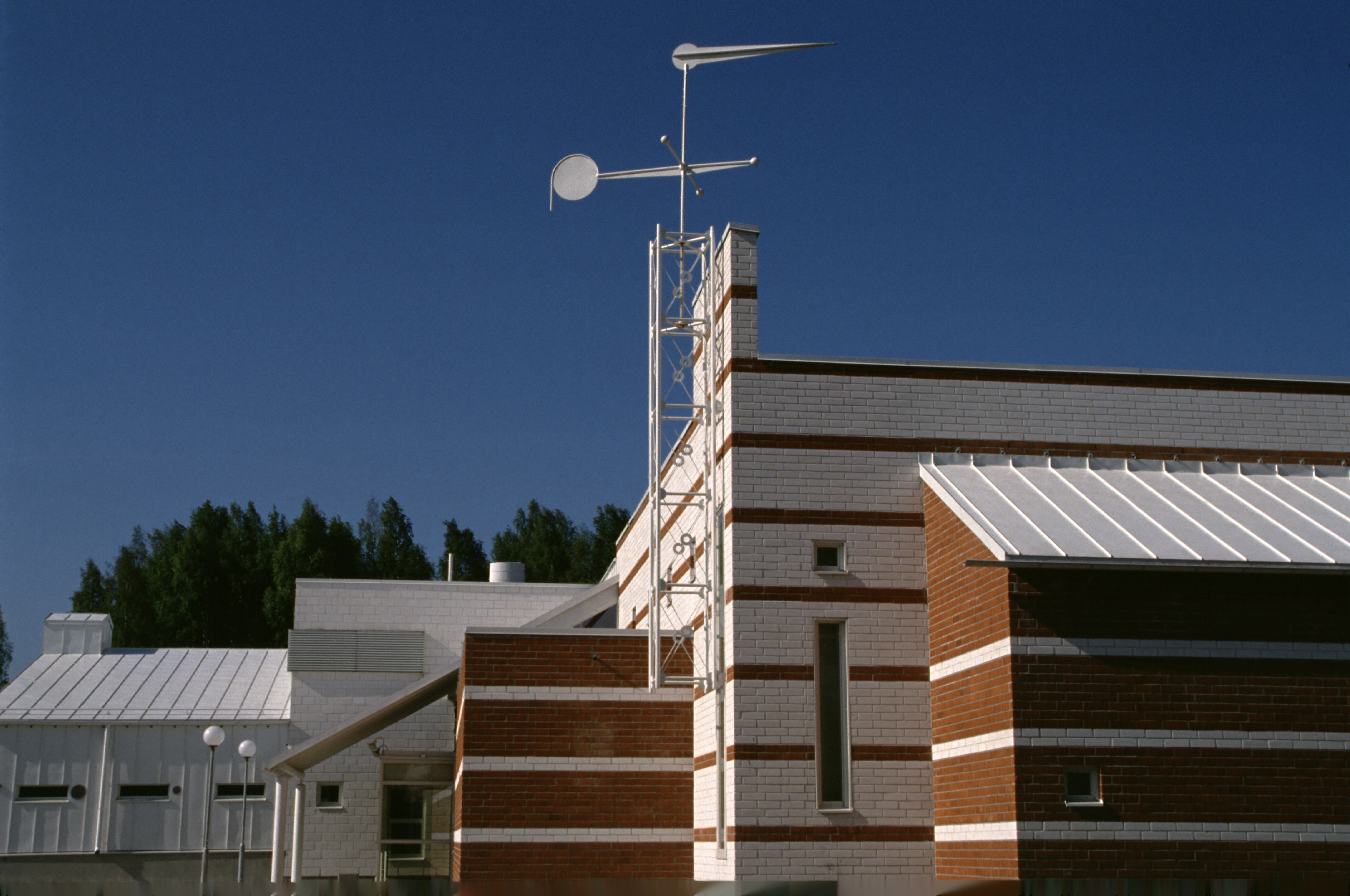
Kurkimäki Multipurpose House, Helsinki, A+P1989

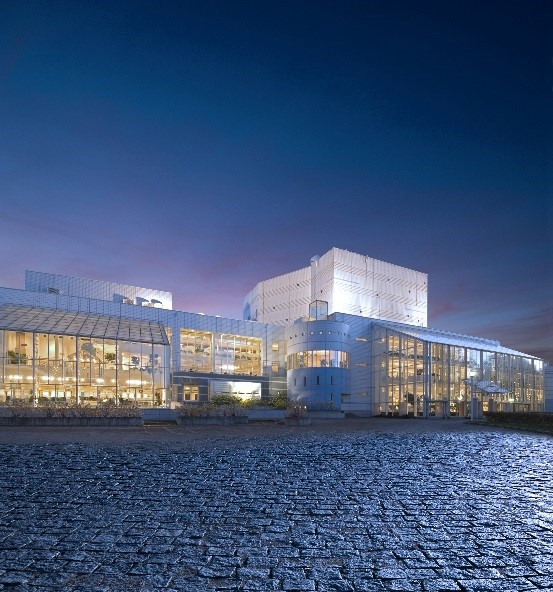
Tampere Hall, A+P 1990

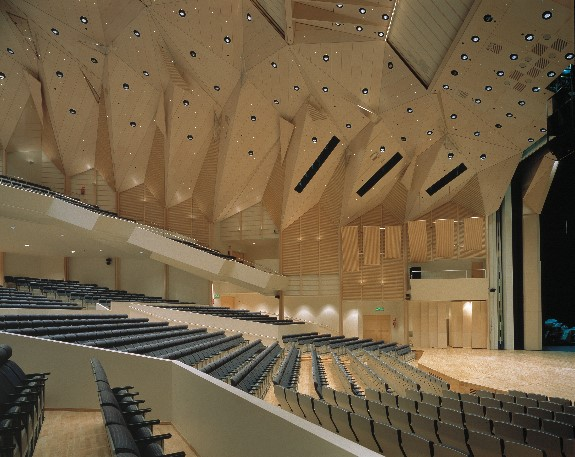
Tampere Hall A+P

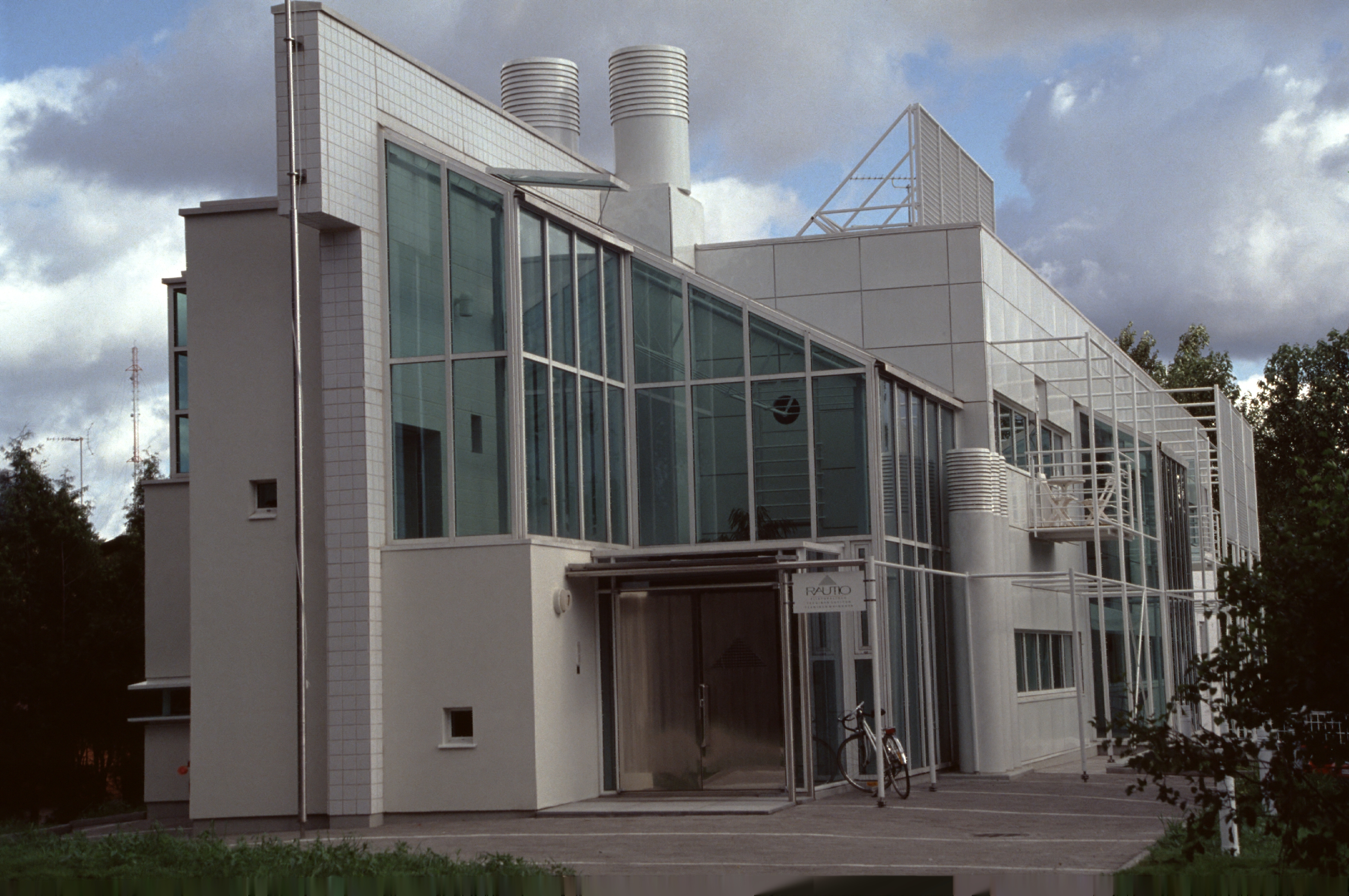
Office building Rautio, Espoo, A+P 1990

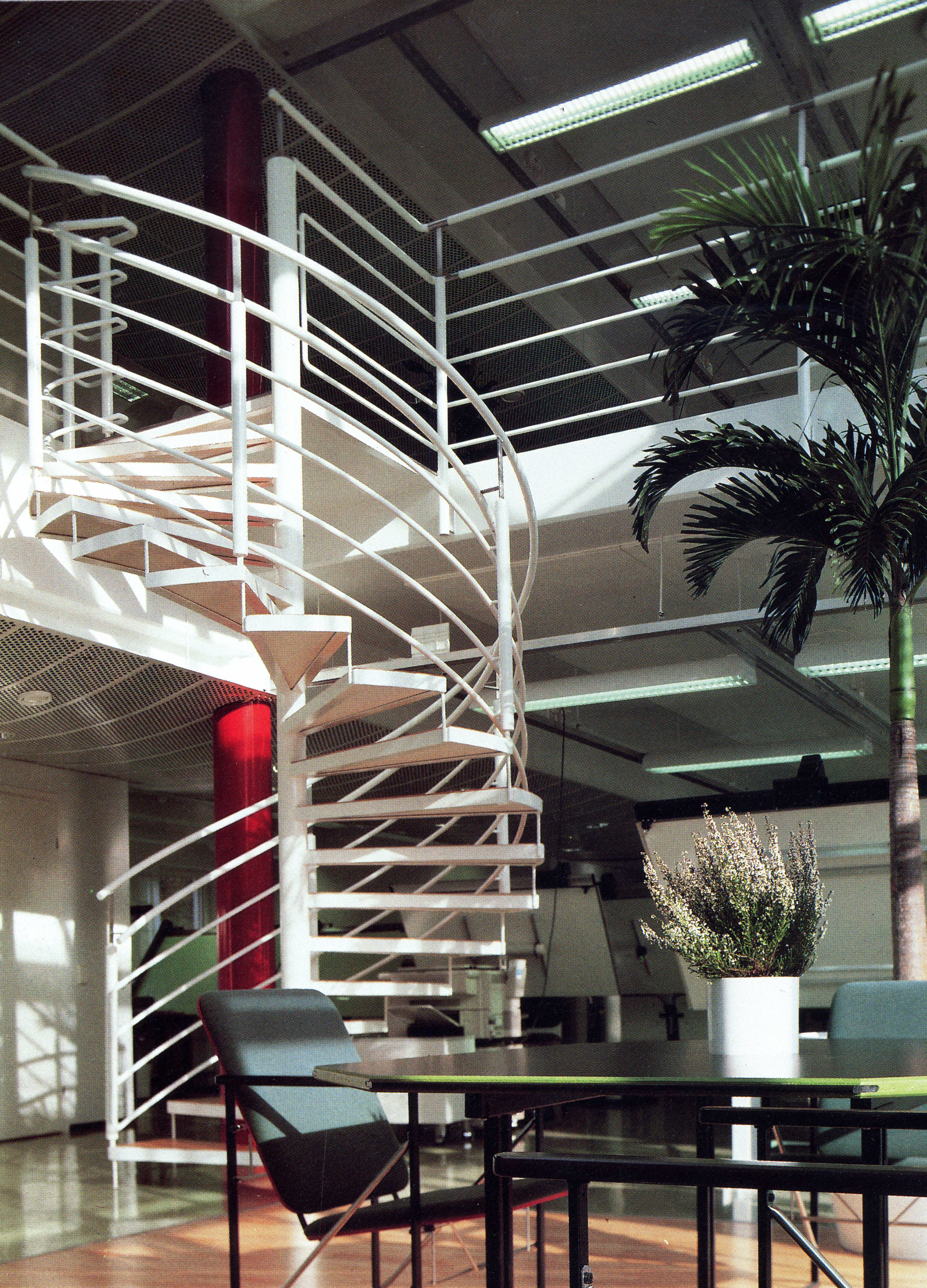
Office building Rautio, Espoo, A+P 1990

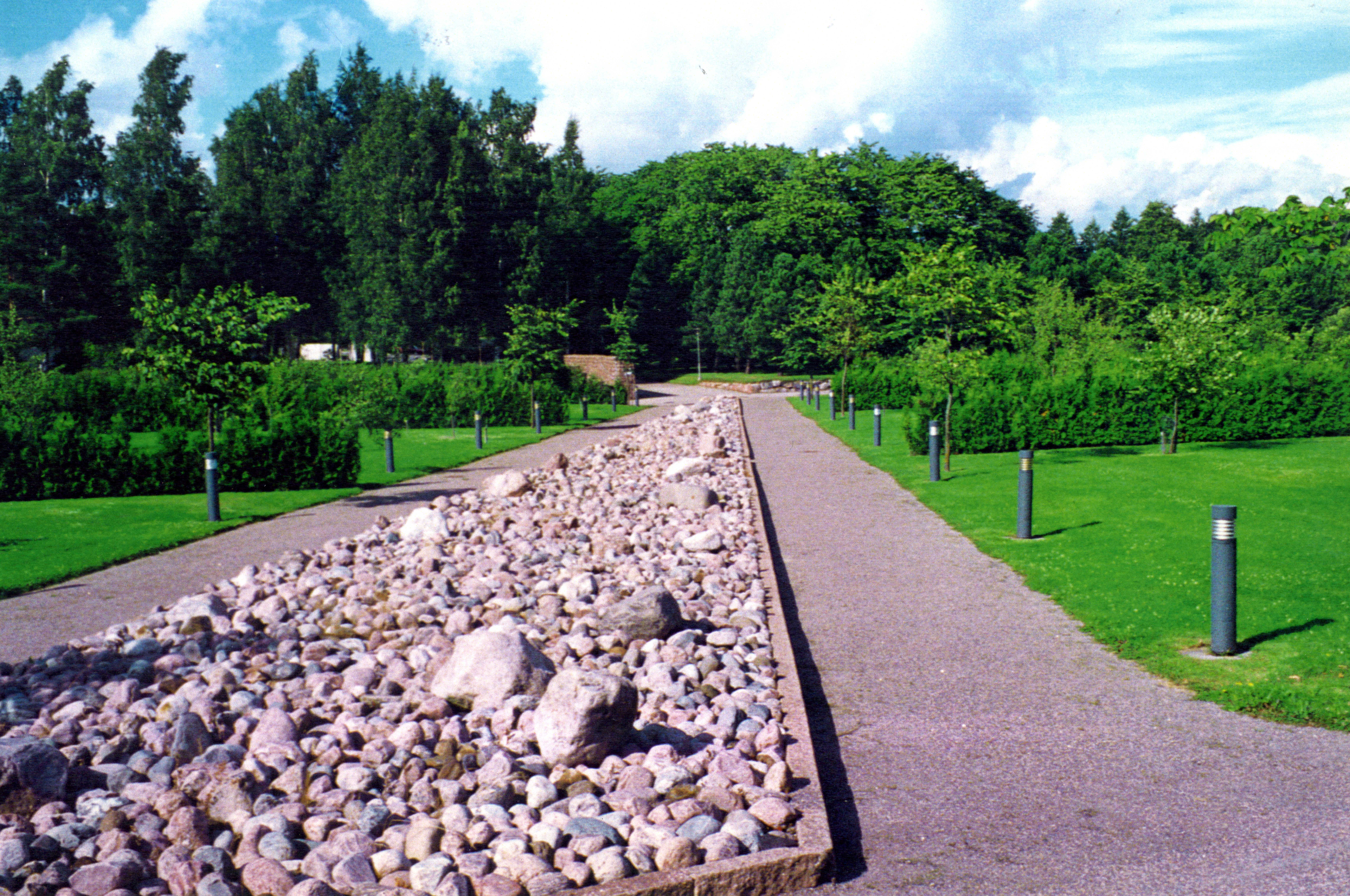
Viikki Triangle Cemetery, Helsinki, together with Leena Lisakkila, A+P 1990

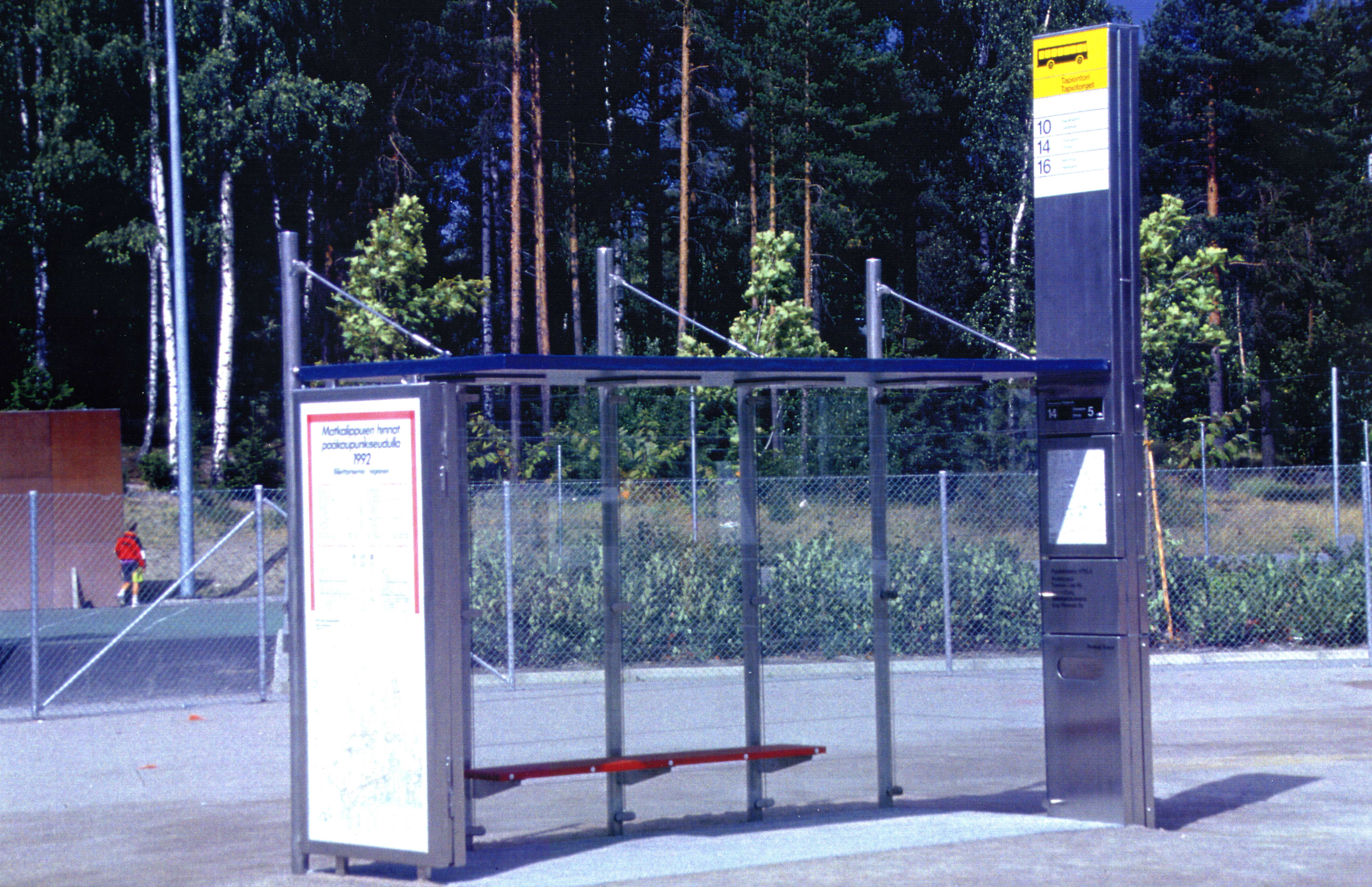
Bus Shelter, Public Design '92, Espoo, 1992

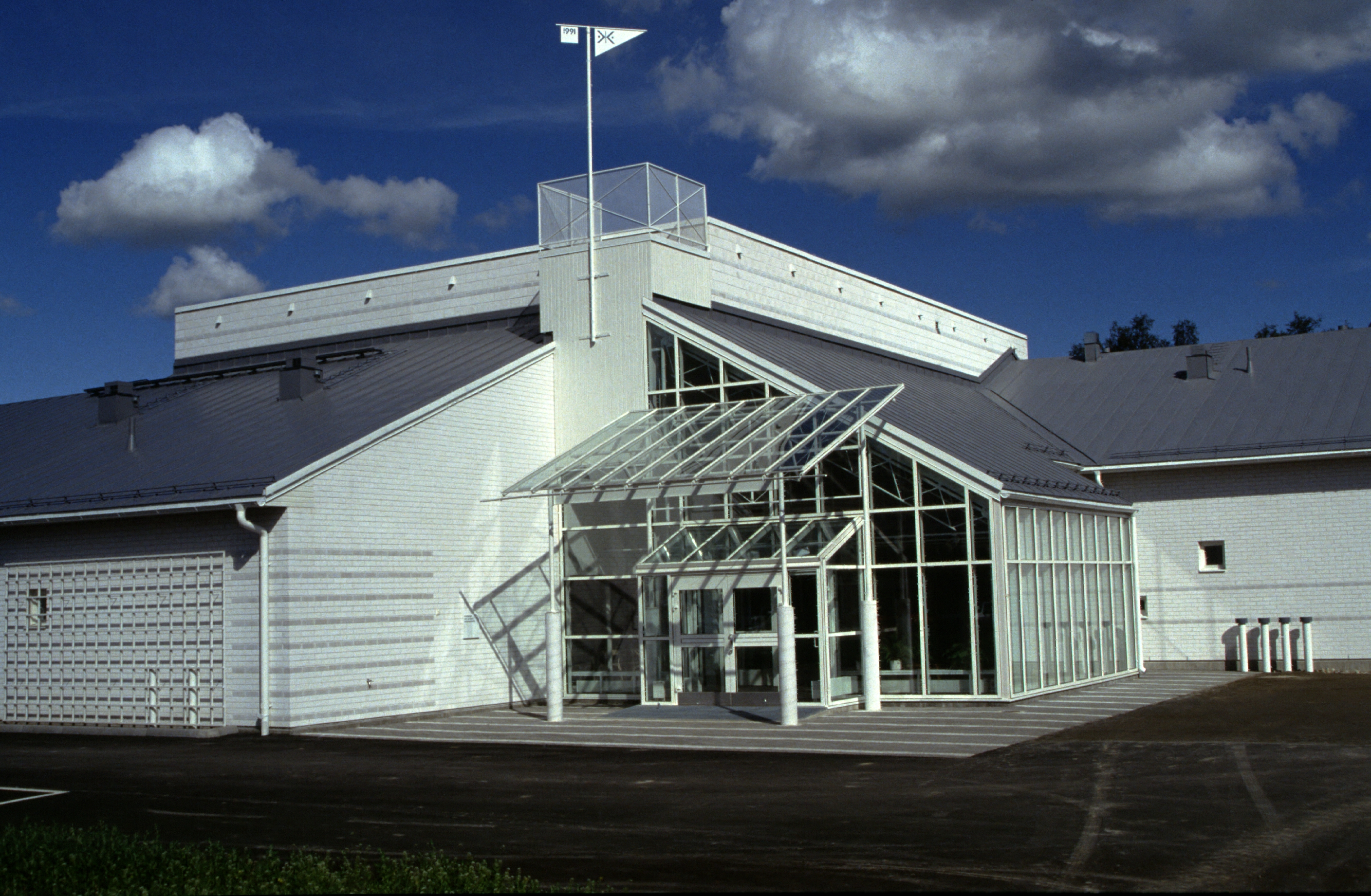
Kauhajoki School of Domestic Economics, renovation and annex 1992

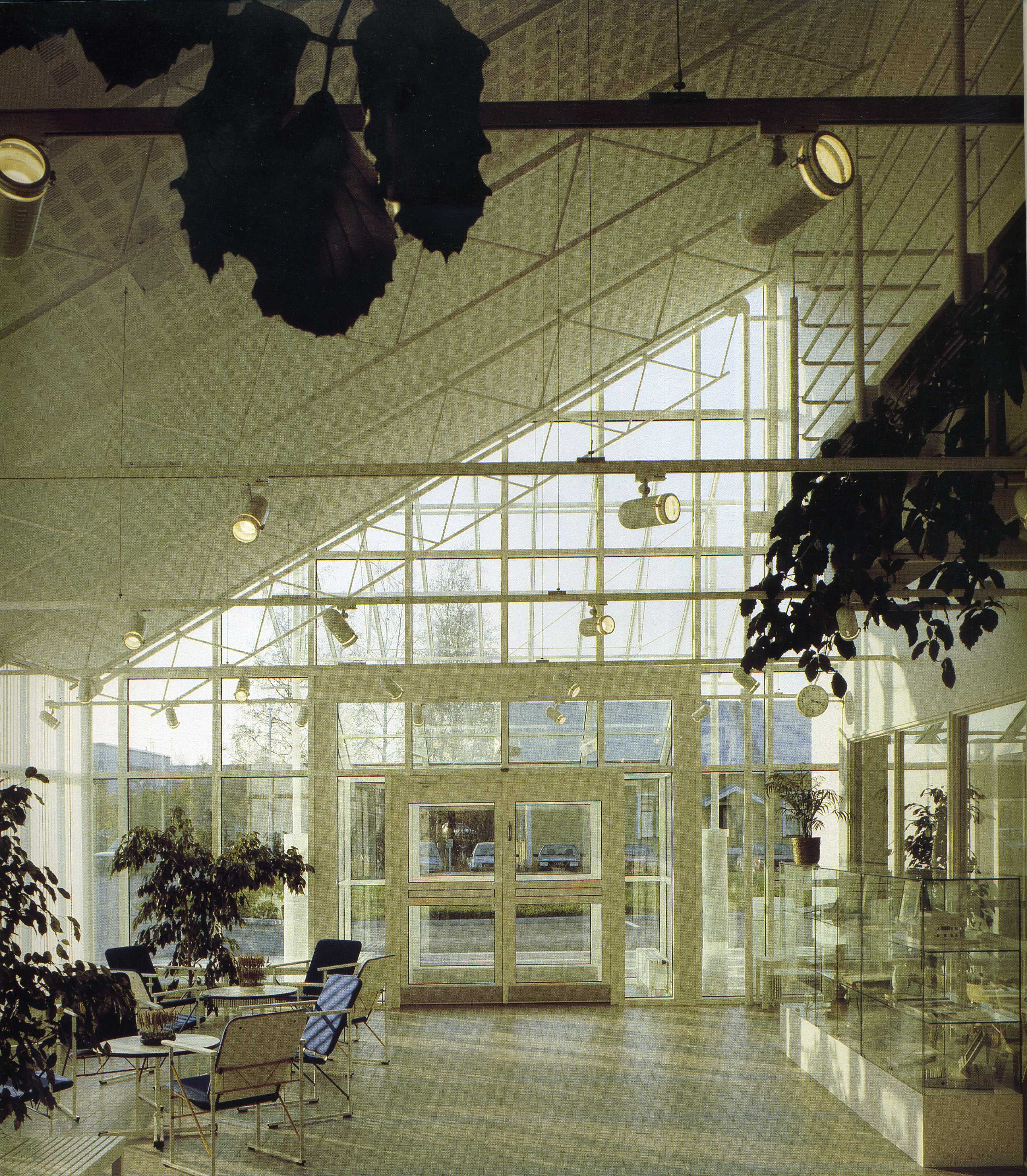
Kauhajoki School of Domestic Economics, renovation and annex 1992

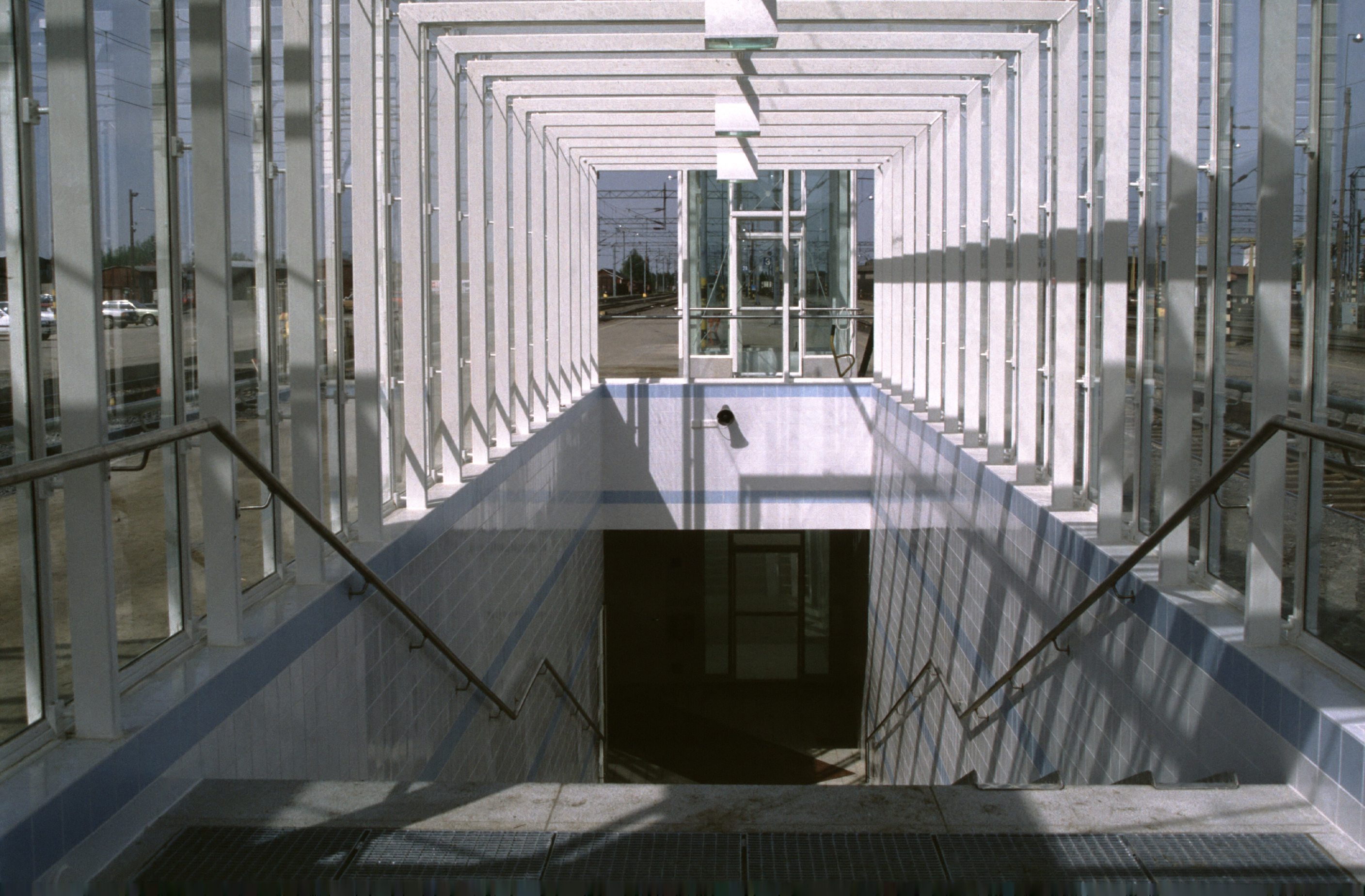
Seinäjoki railway station, pedestrian tunnel and platform shelters 1993

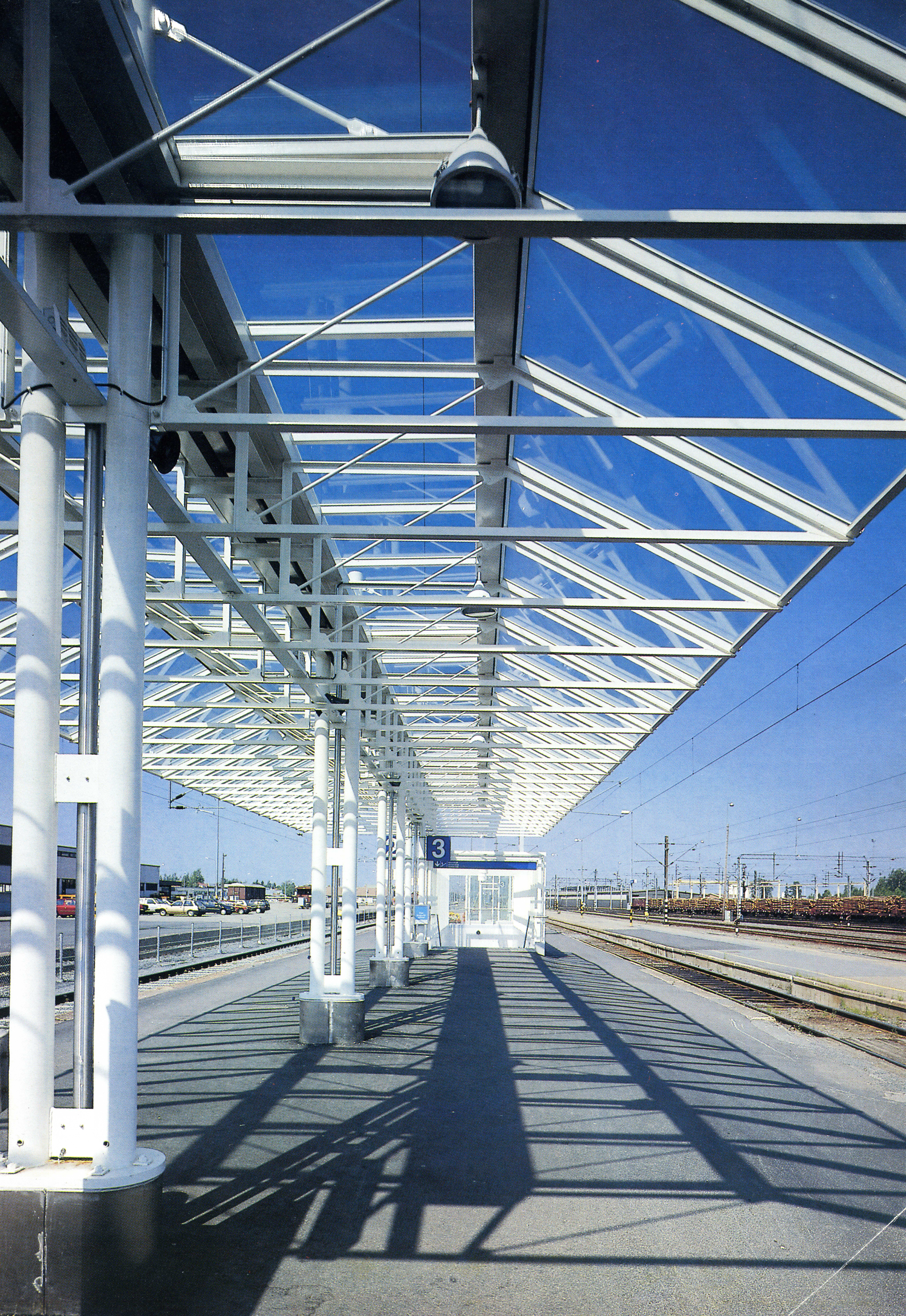
Seinäjoki railway station, pedestrian tunnel and platform shelters 1993

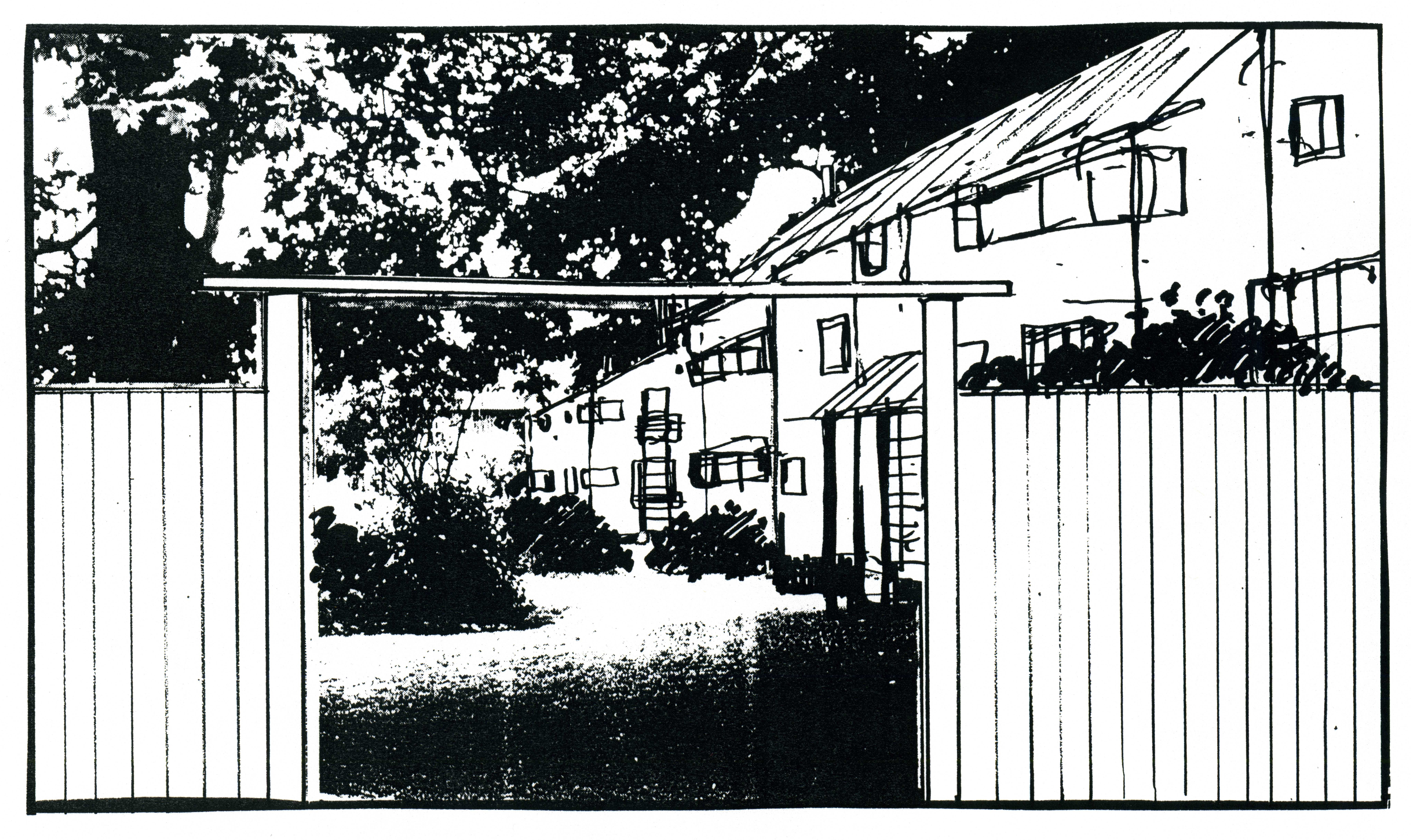
Luuniemi Housing Area, Iisalmi competition entry 1993

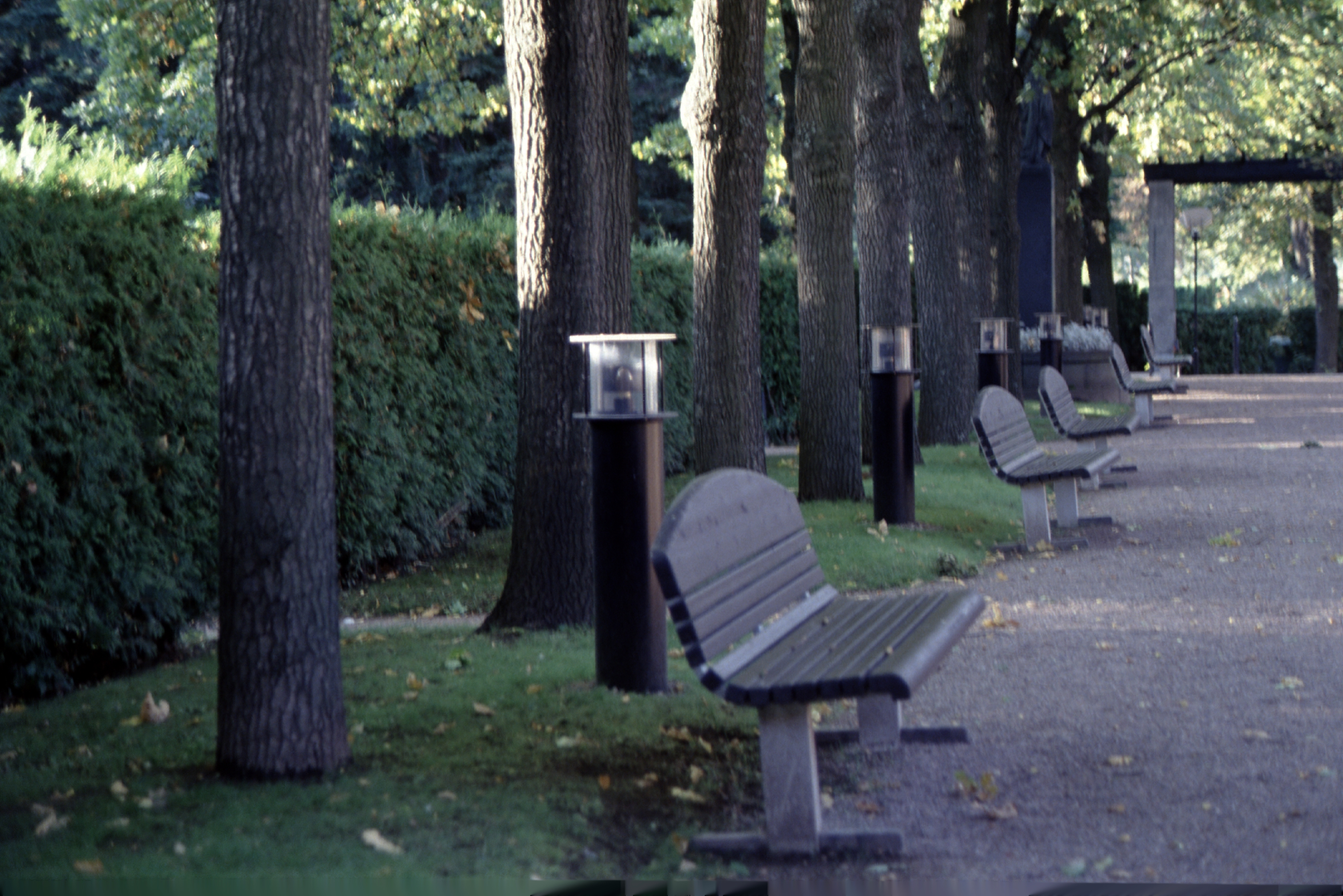
Hietaniemi cemetery, Helsinki, Lighting fixtures 1993

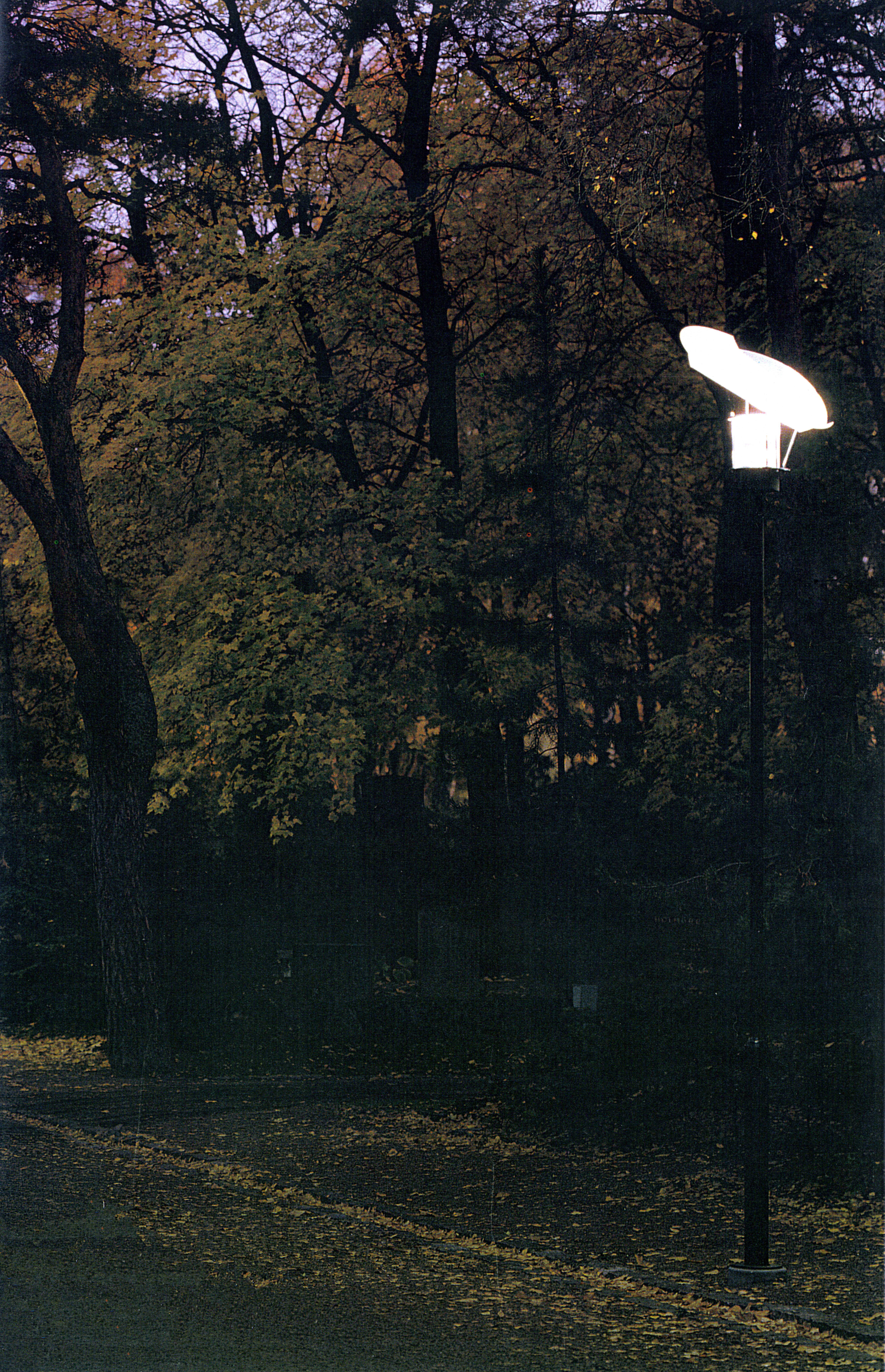
Hietaniemi cemetery, Helsinki, Lighting fixtures 1993

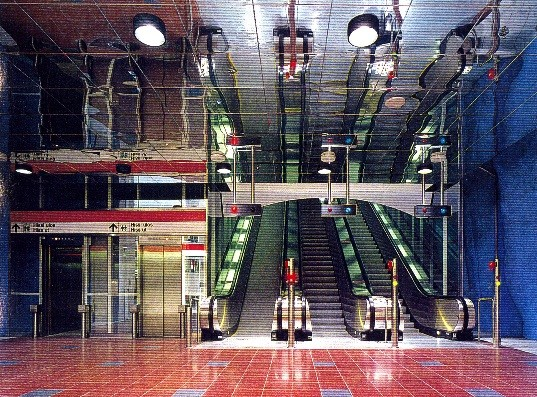
University of Helsinki metro station, platform hall, Helsinki 1995

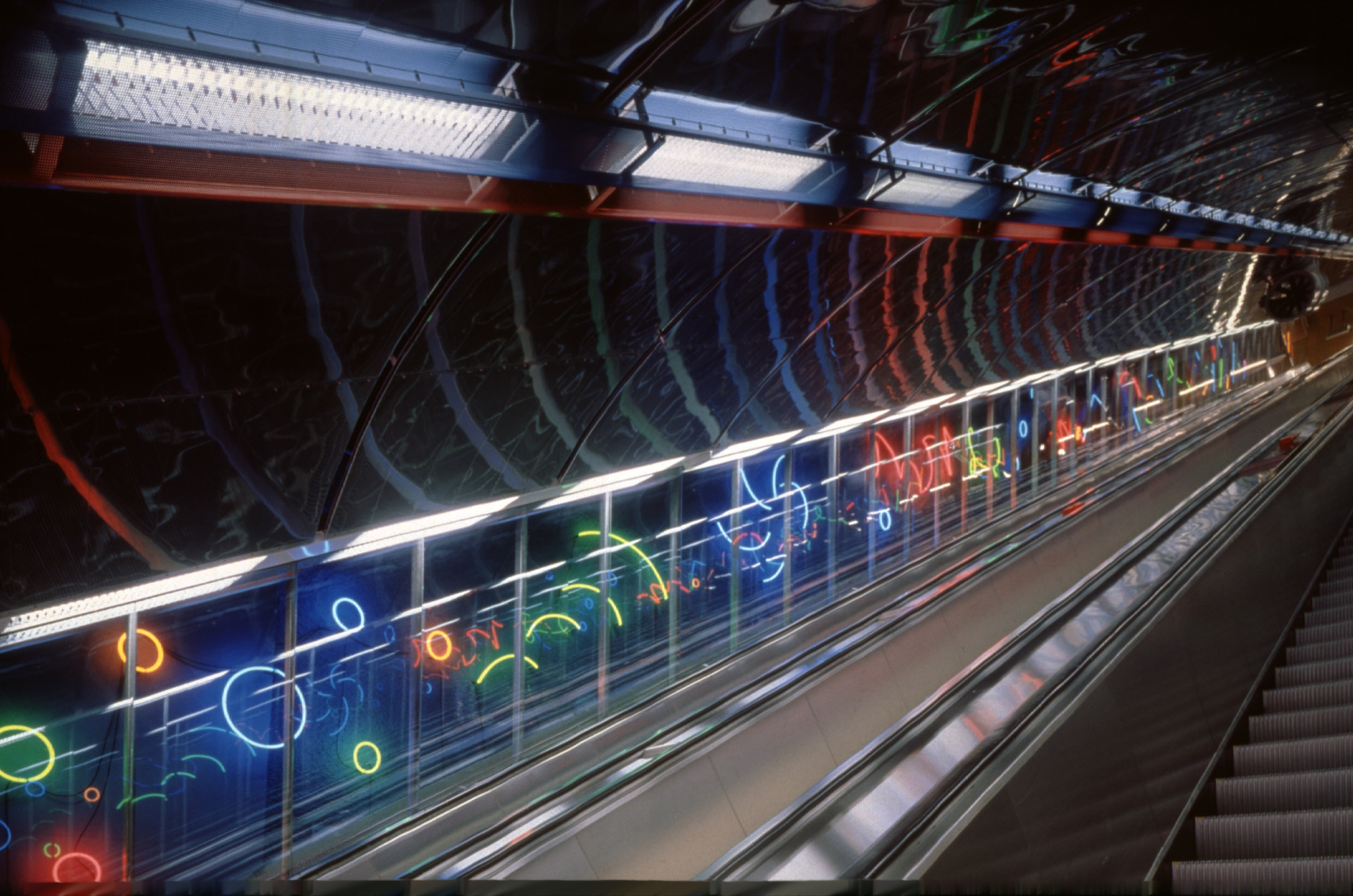
University of Helsinki metro station, platform hall, Helsinki 1995

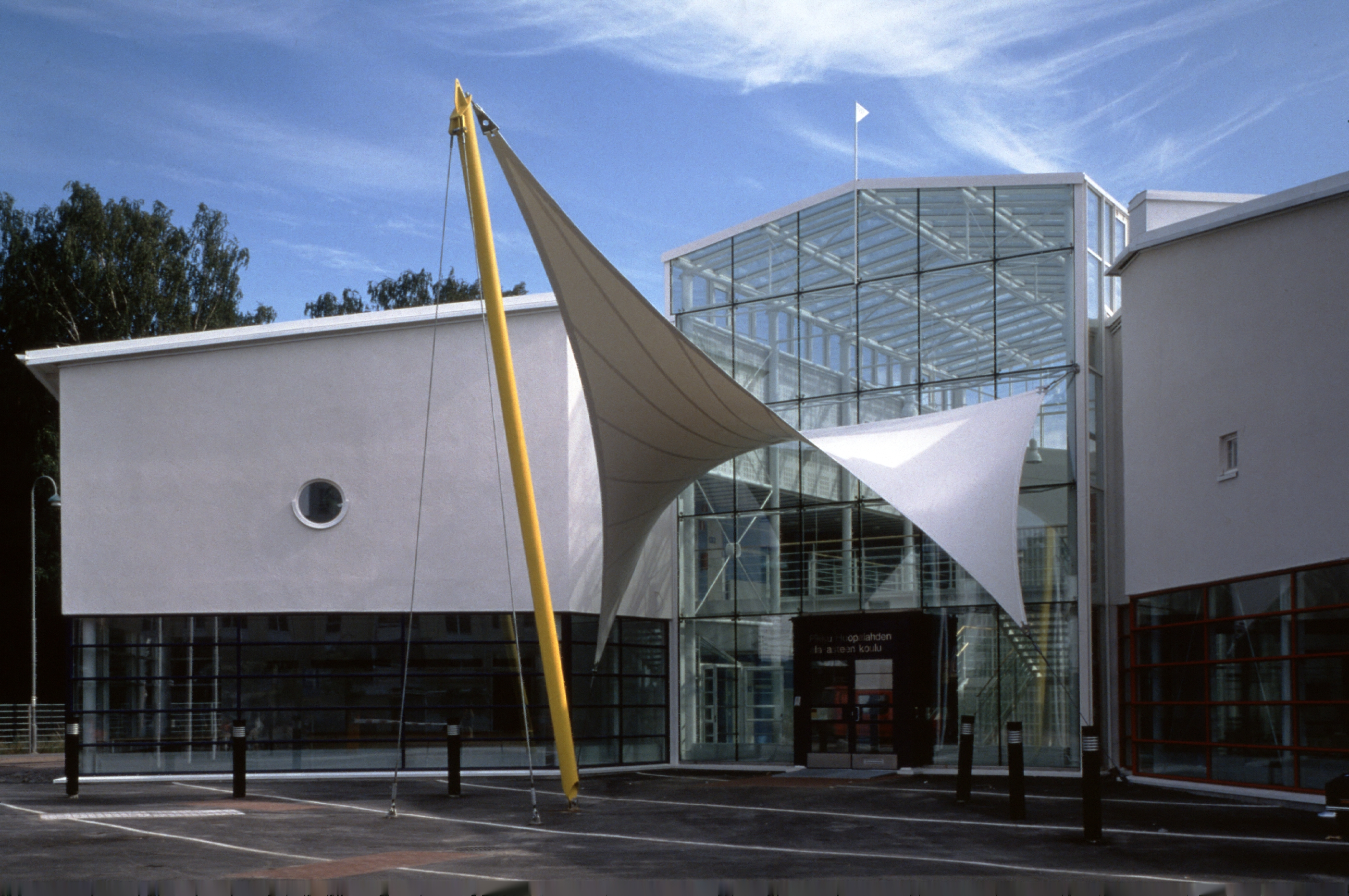
Pikku-Huopalahti Multipurpose House, Helsinki 1997

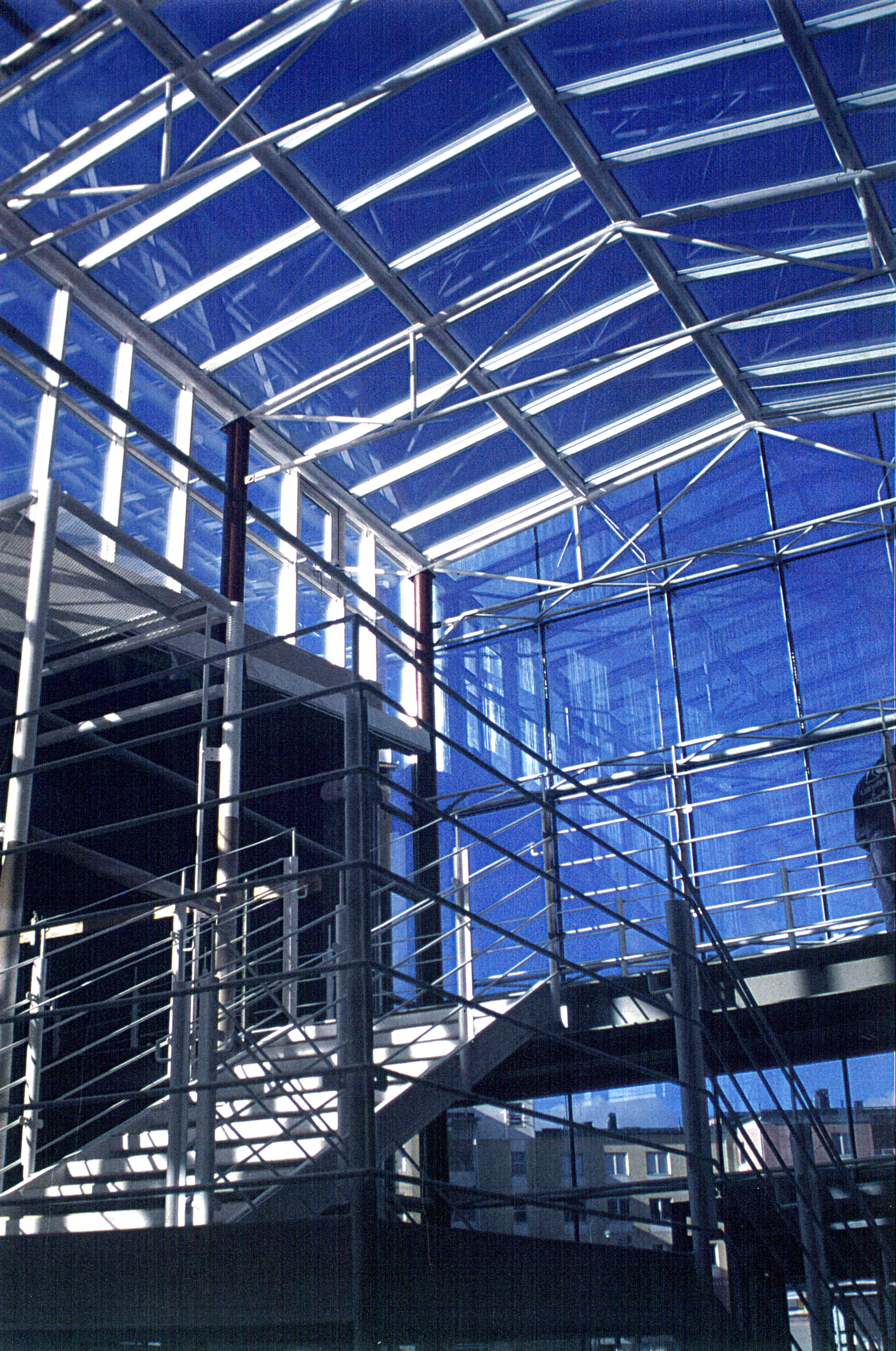
Pikku-Huopalahti Multipurpose House, Helsinki 1997

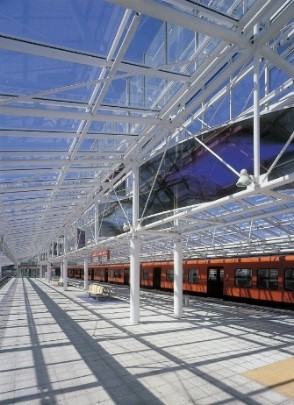
Vuosaari metro station, Helsinki 1998

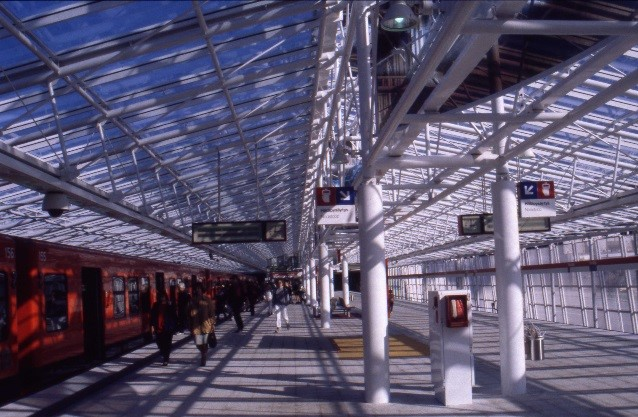
Vuosaari metro station, Helsinki 1998

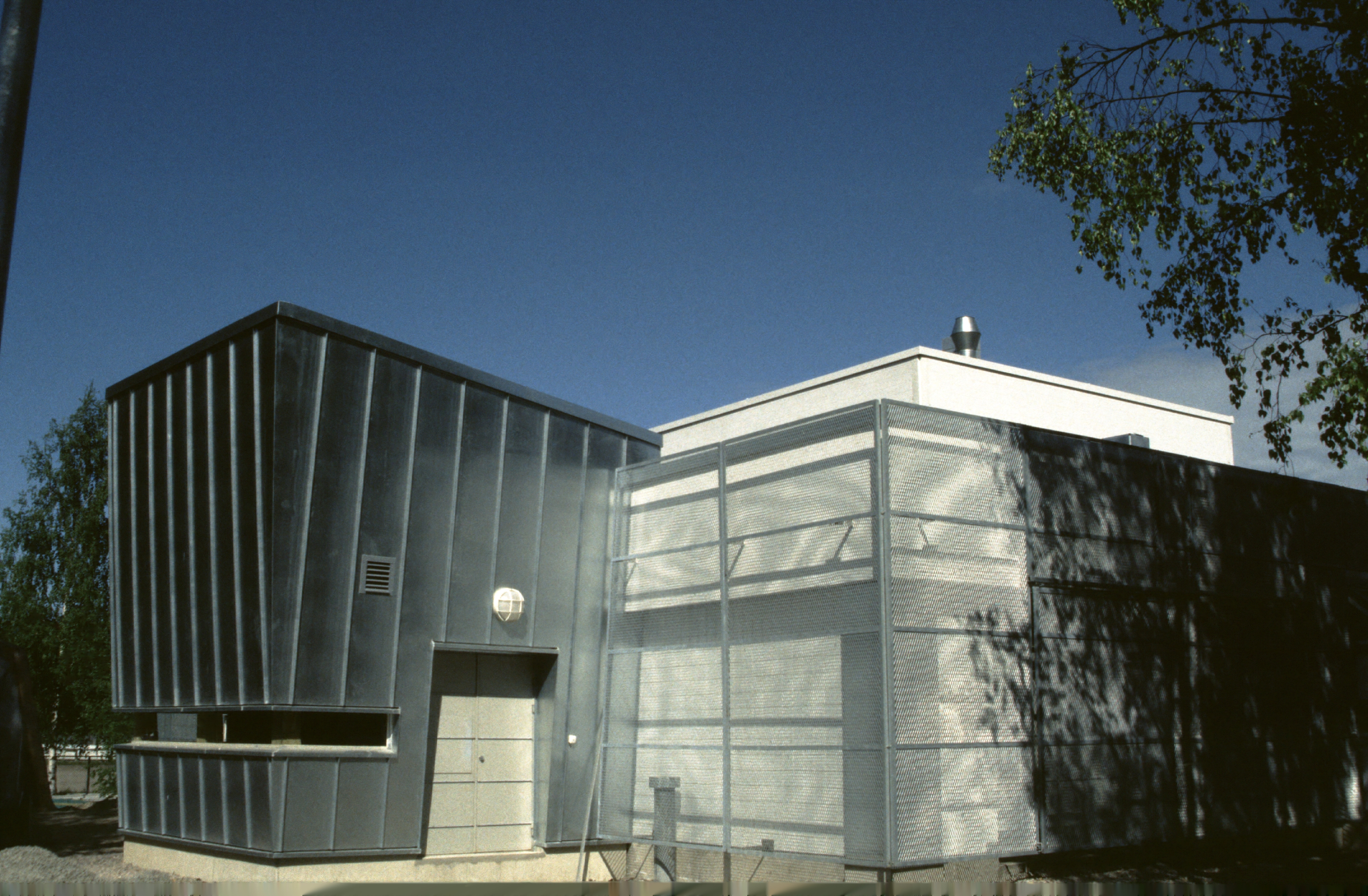
Helsinki 2nd Training School renovation and annex 1999

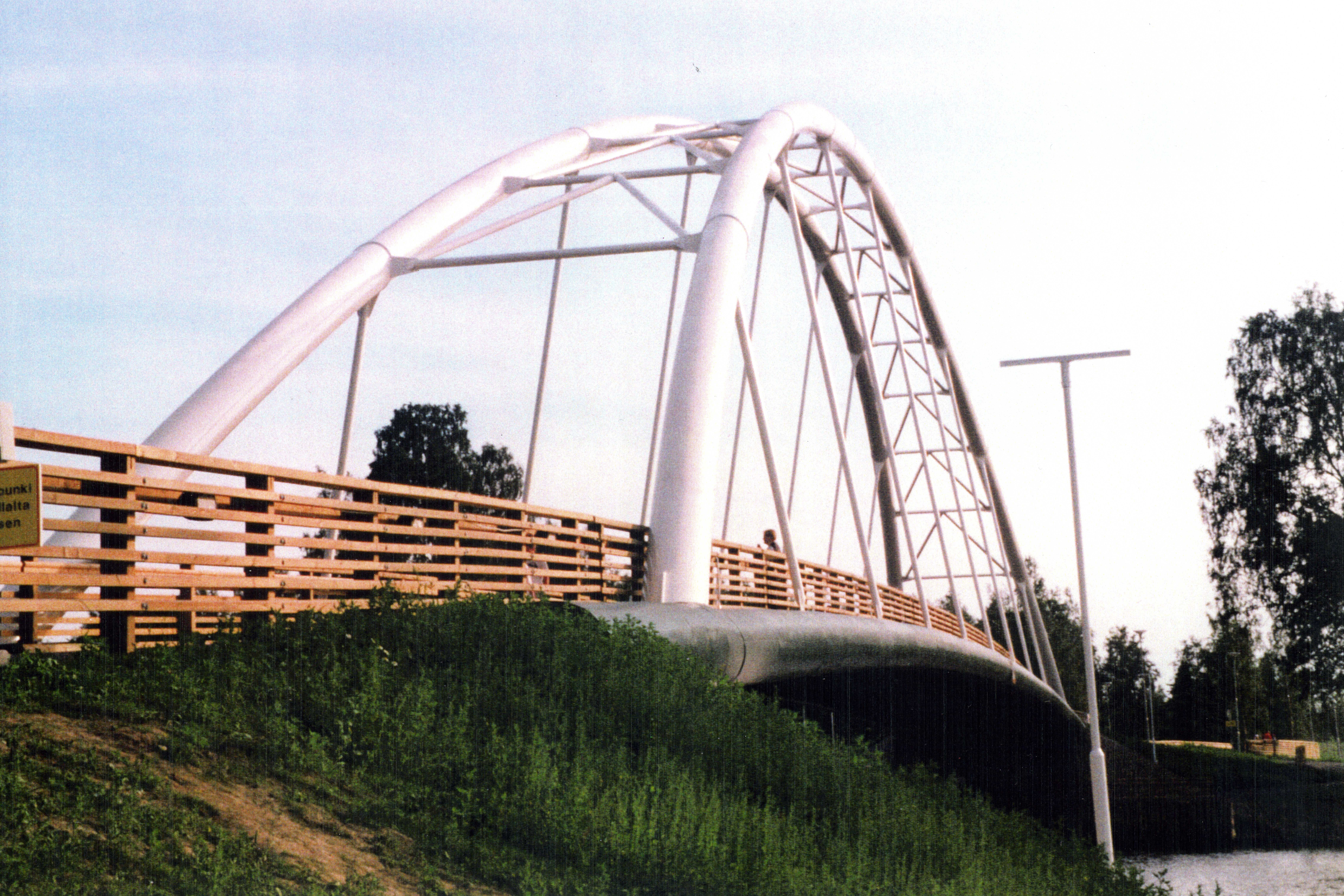
Pormestari Pedestrian bridge, Pori 2001

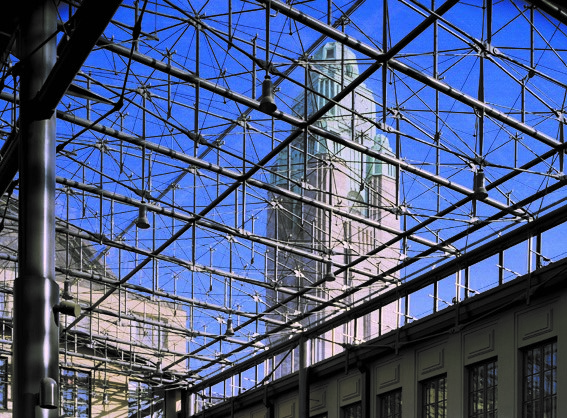
Helsinki Railway Station, Platform Roofing 2001

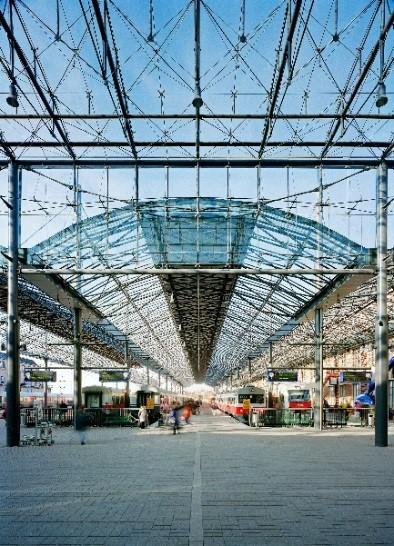
Helsingin Railway Station Platform Roofing 2001

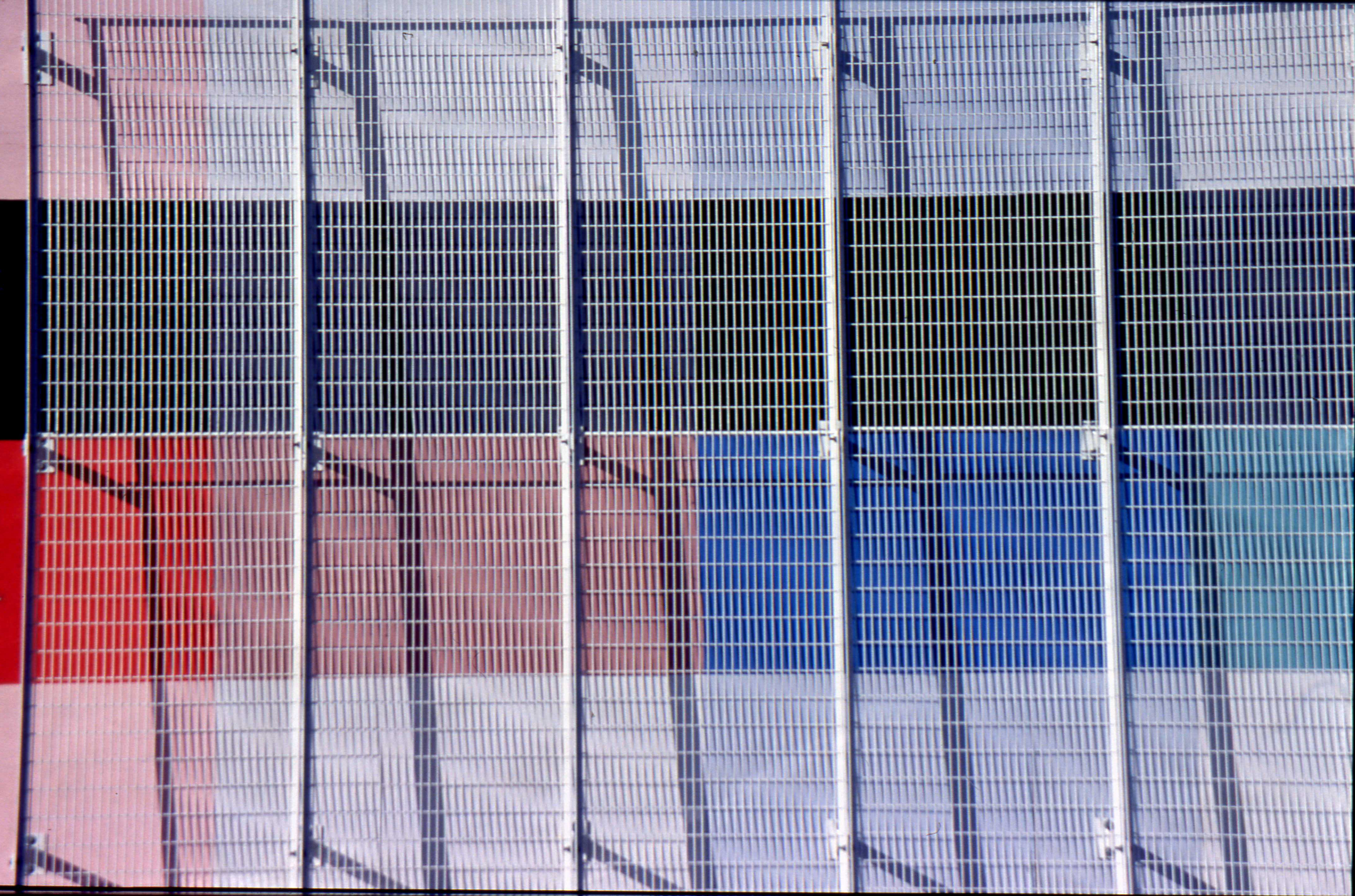
Kehä 1 traffic noise barries, Kannelmäki-Lassila, Helsinki 2002

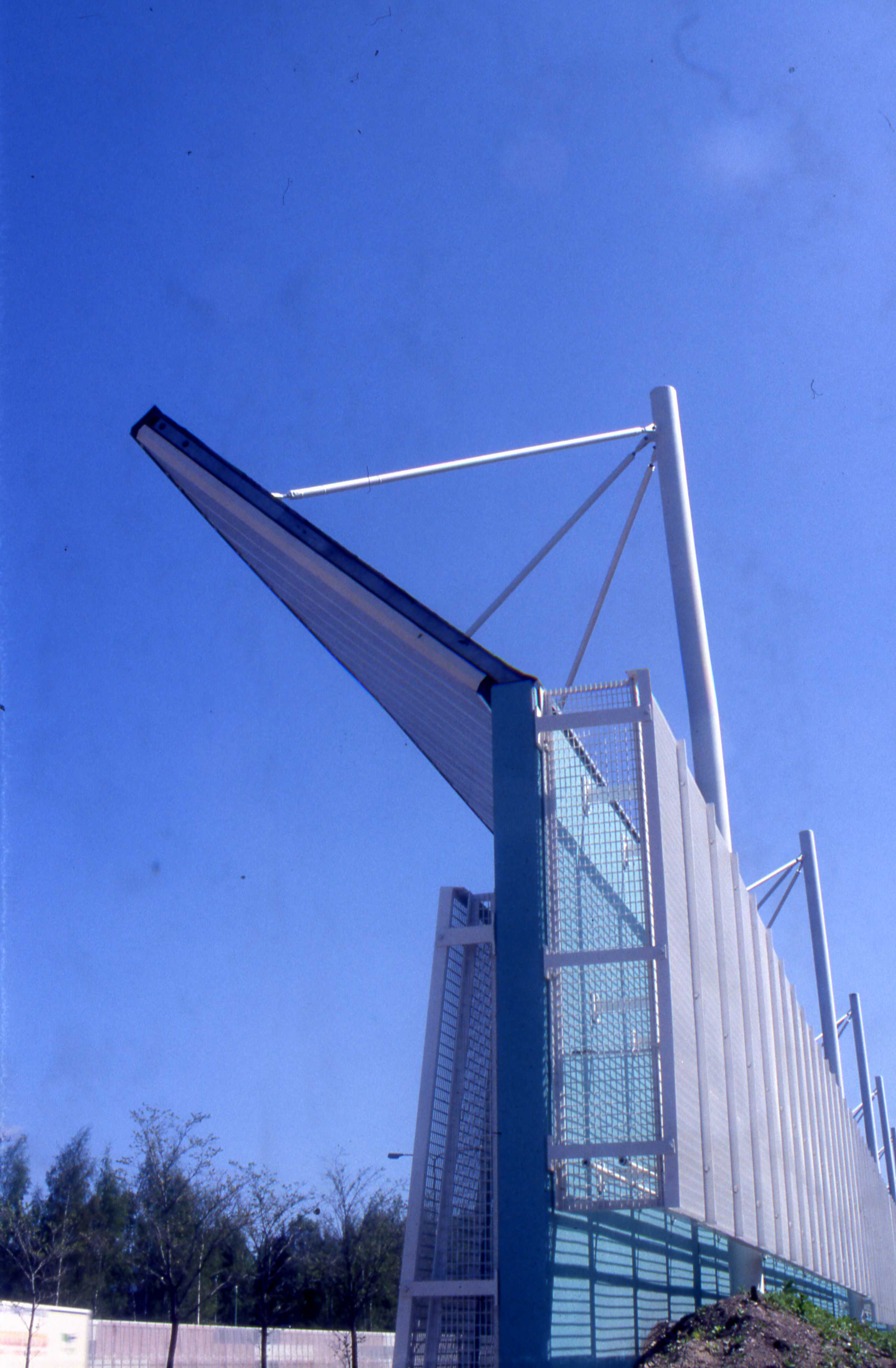
Kehä 1 traffic noise barries, Kannelmäki-Lassila, Helsinki 2002

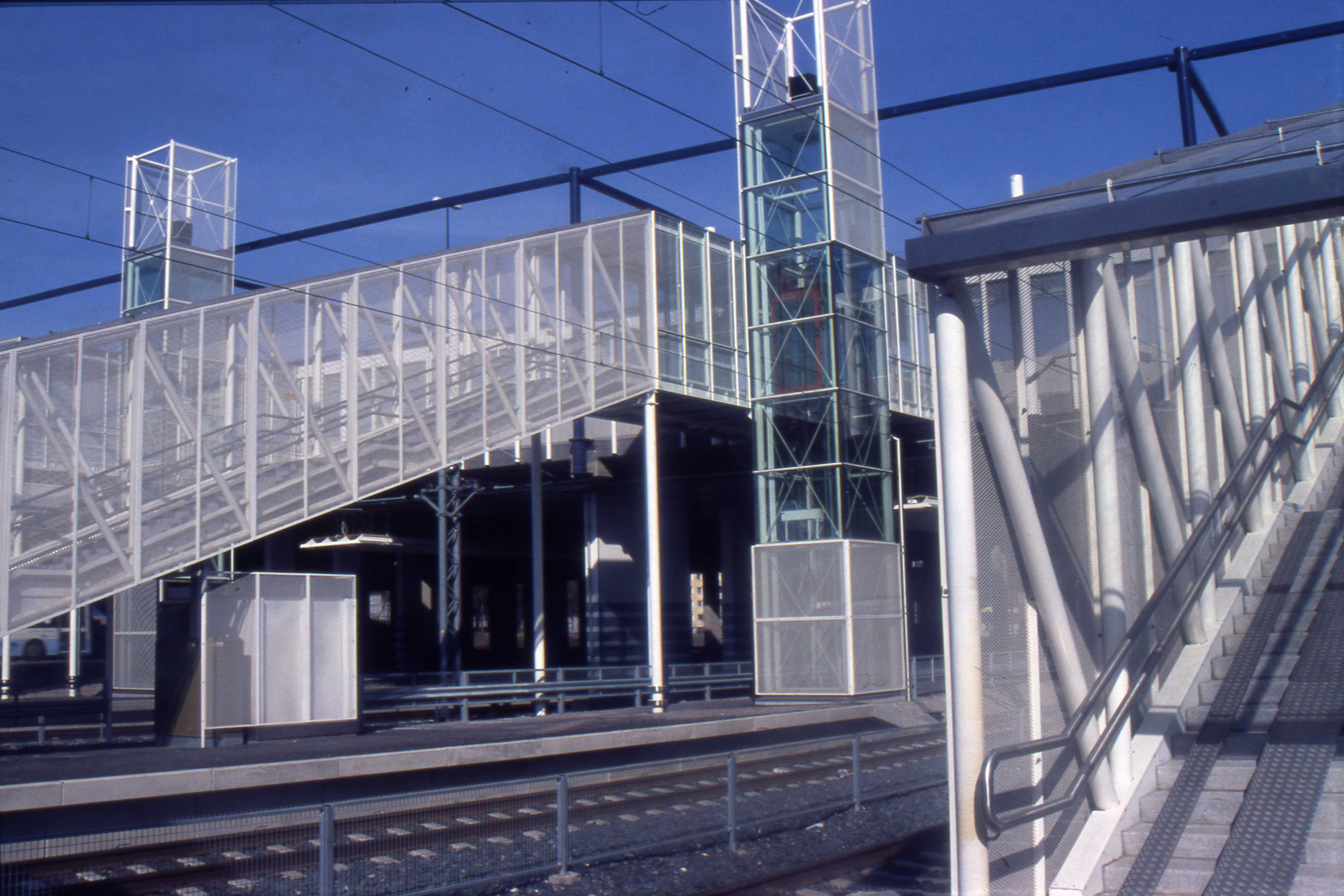
Leppävaara Exchange Terminal, Espoo 2002

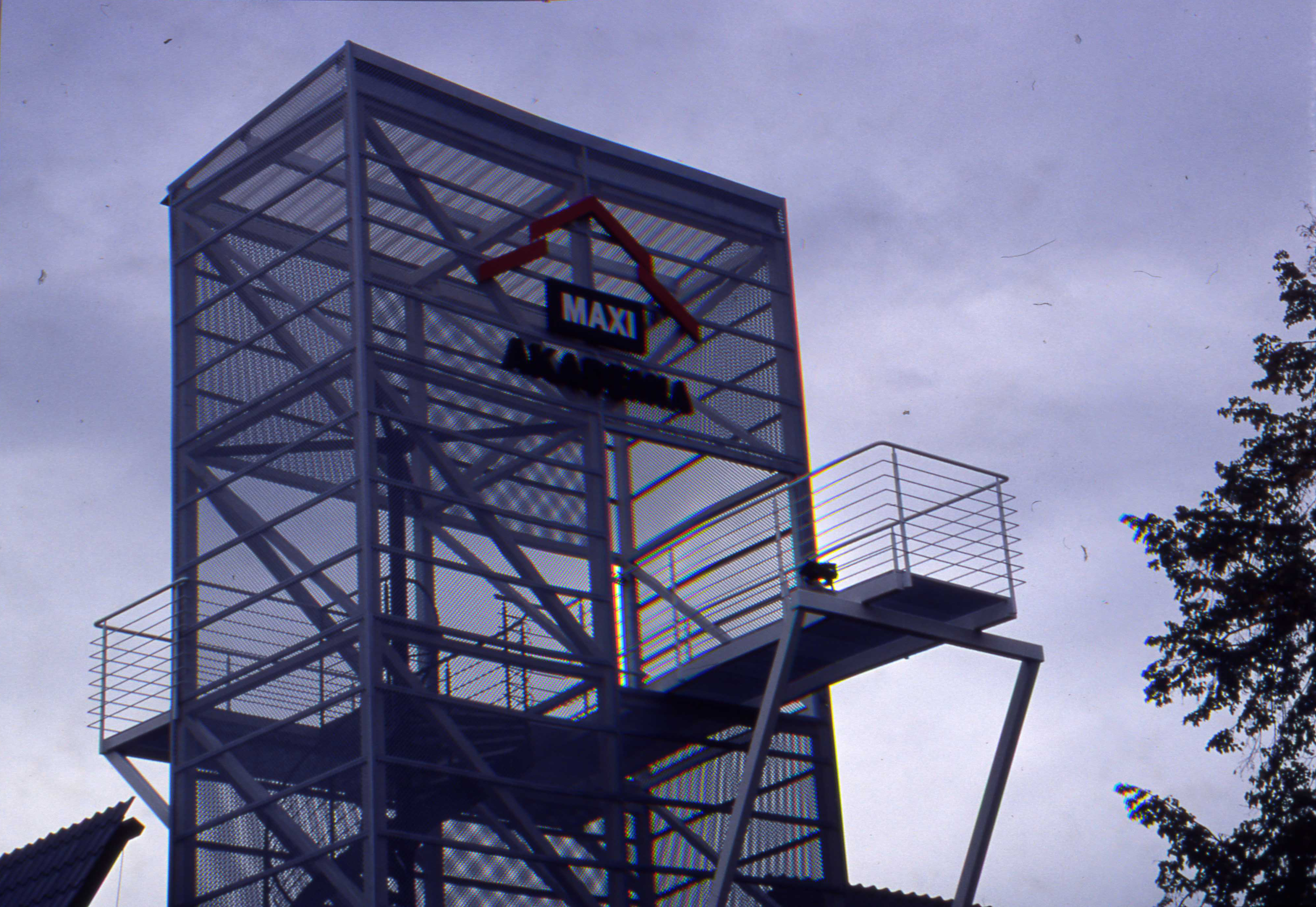
Rataruukki Polska, Technology Center, Zyrardow 2002

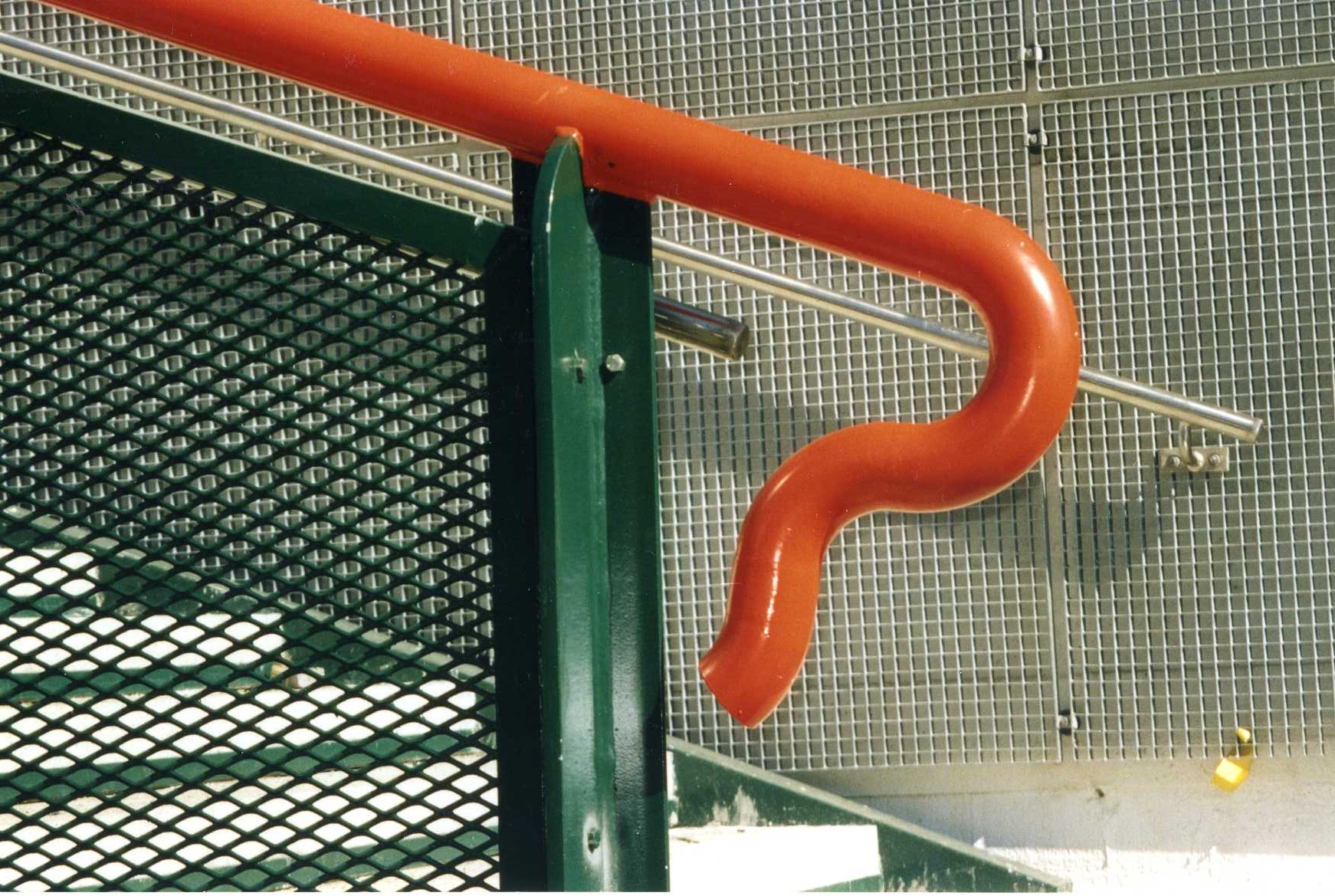
Bus-Joker, Oulunkylä-Viikki, Helsinki 2003

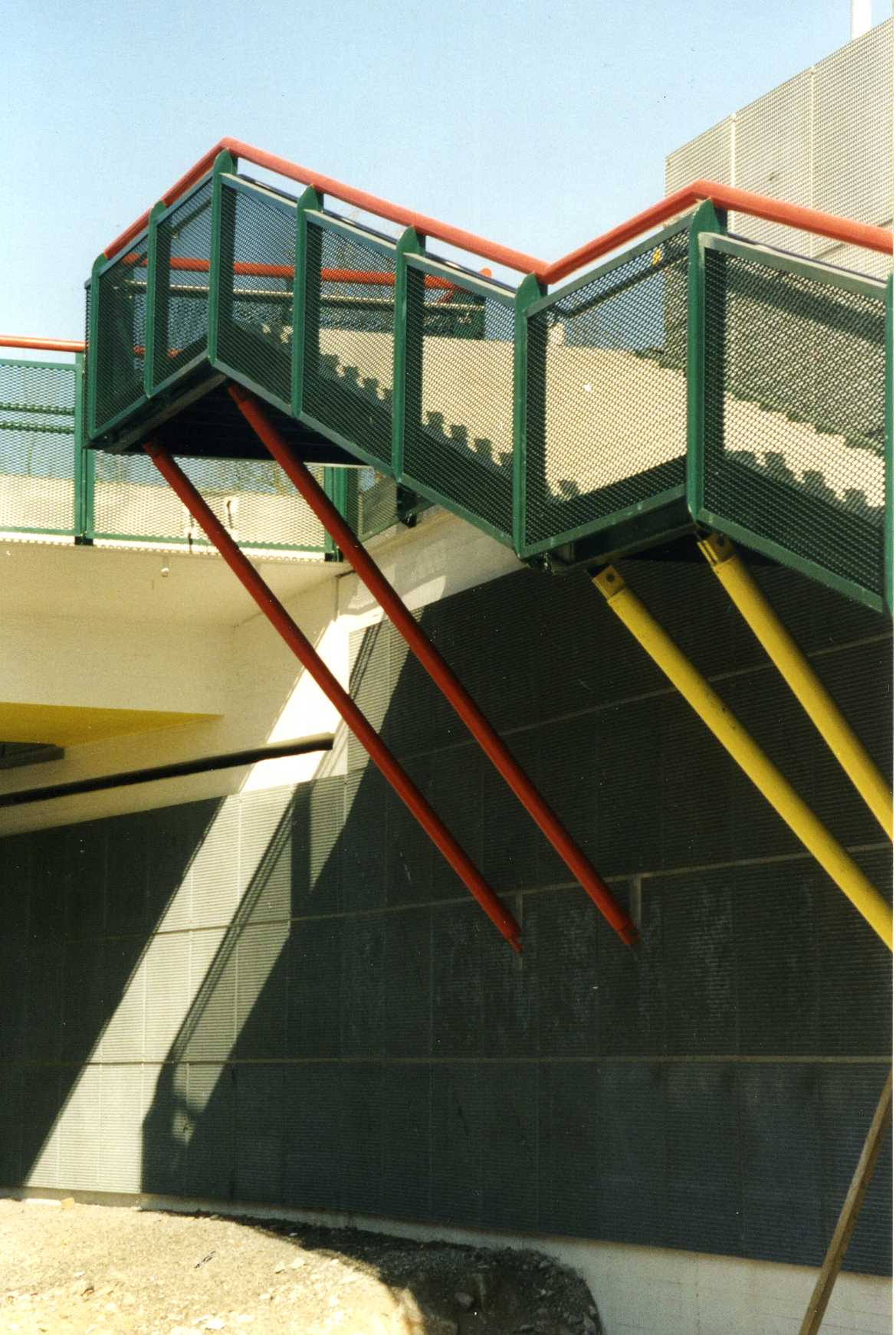
Bus-Joker, Oulunkylä-Viikki, Helsinki 2003

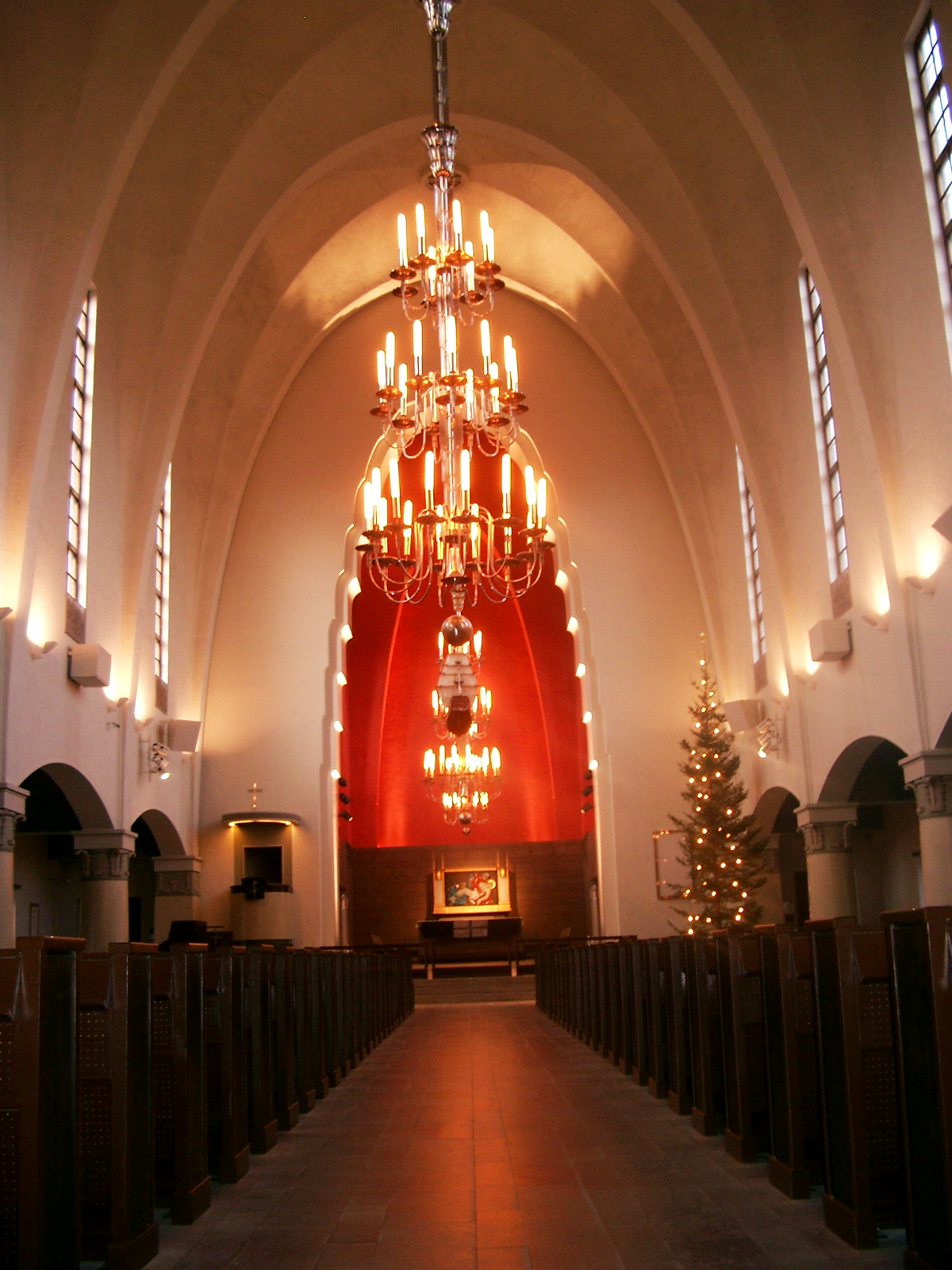
Mikael Agricola Church, renovation, Helsinki 2004

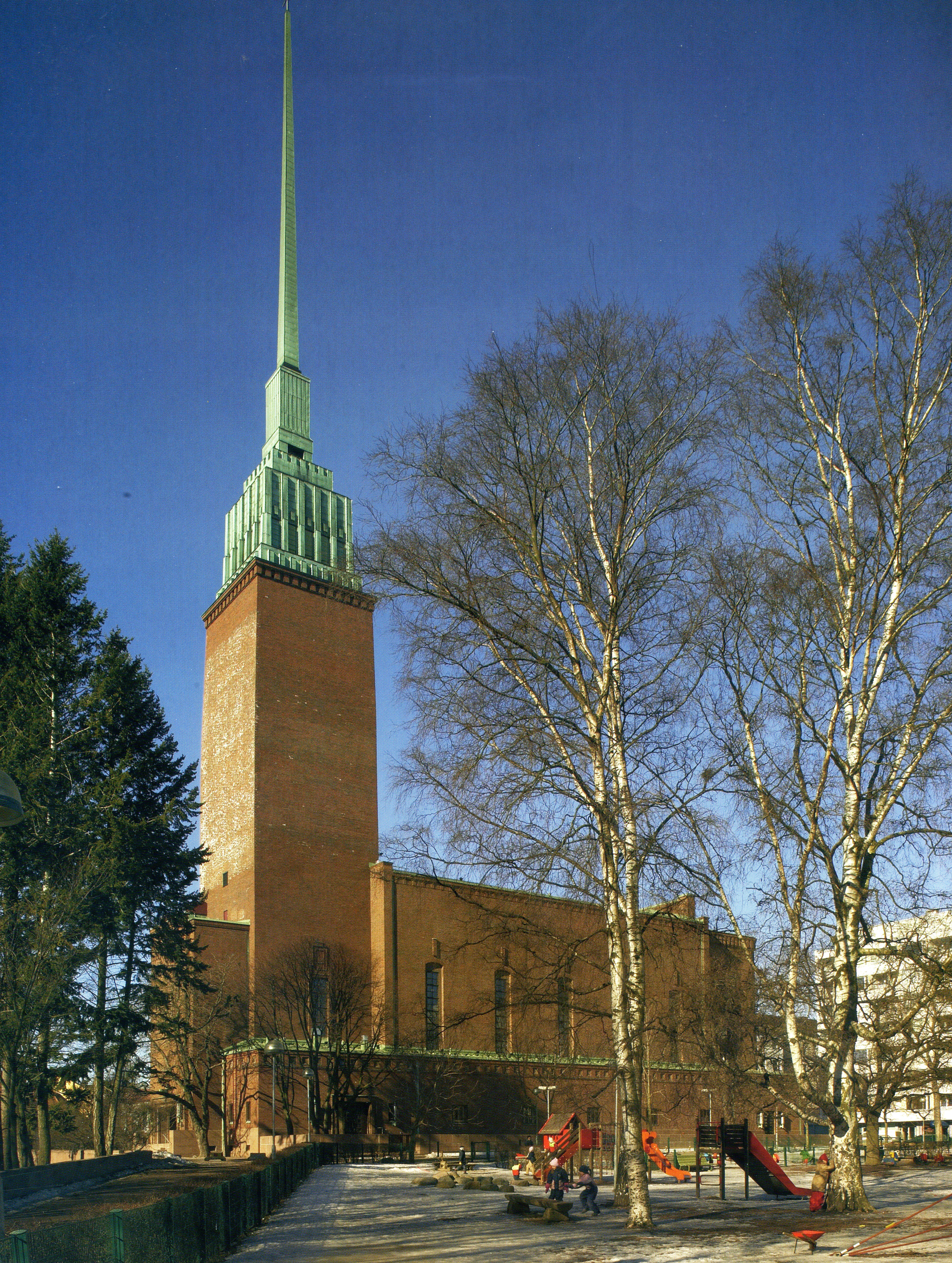
Mikael Agricola Church, renovation, Helsinki 2004

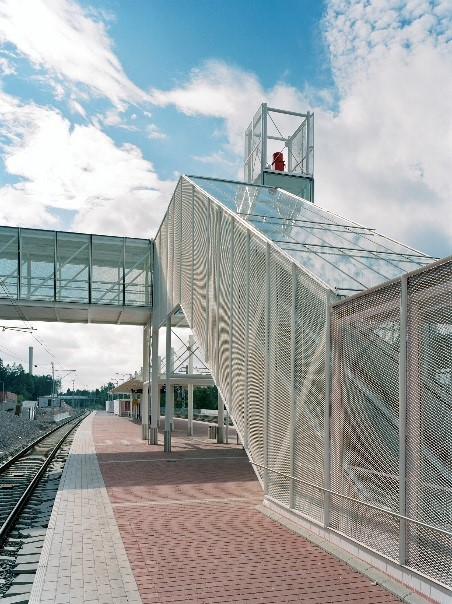
Koivukylä railway station, Vantaa 2004

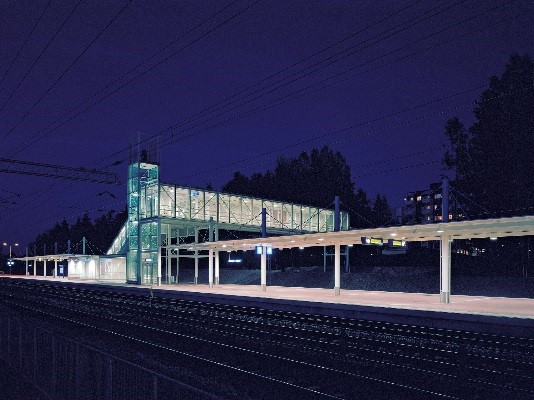
Koivukylä railway station, Vantaa 2004

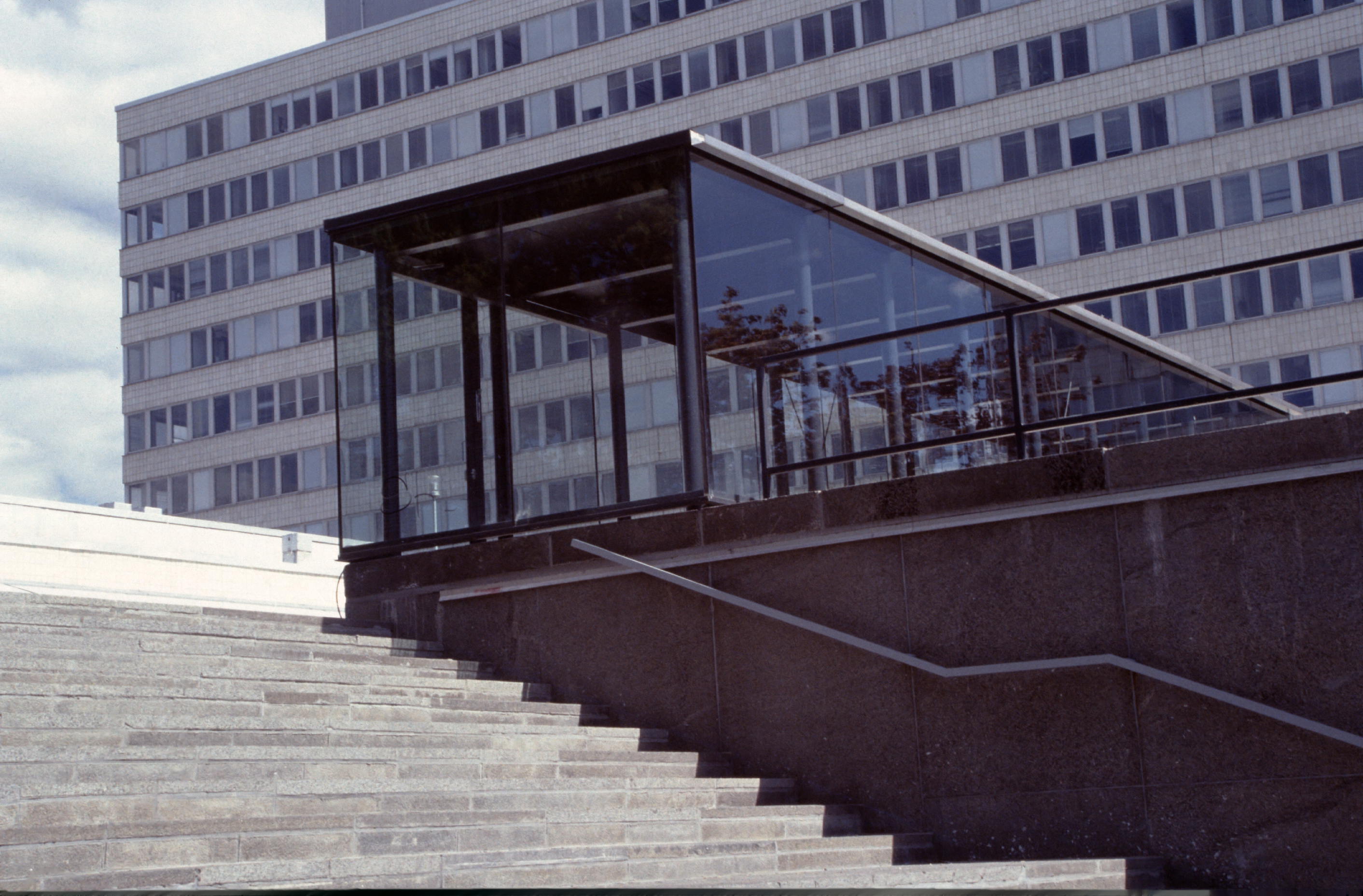
Kallio Municipal Offices renovation, Helsinki 2004

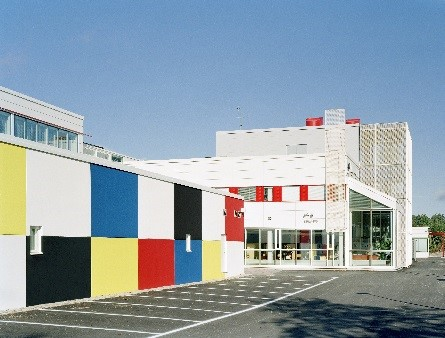
Mikkola School, Vantaa 2005

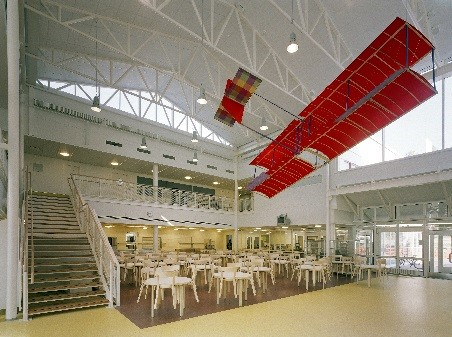
Mikkola School, Vantaa 2005

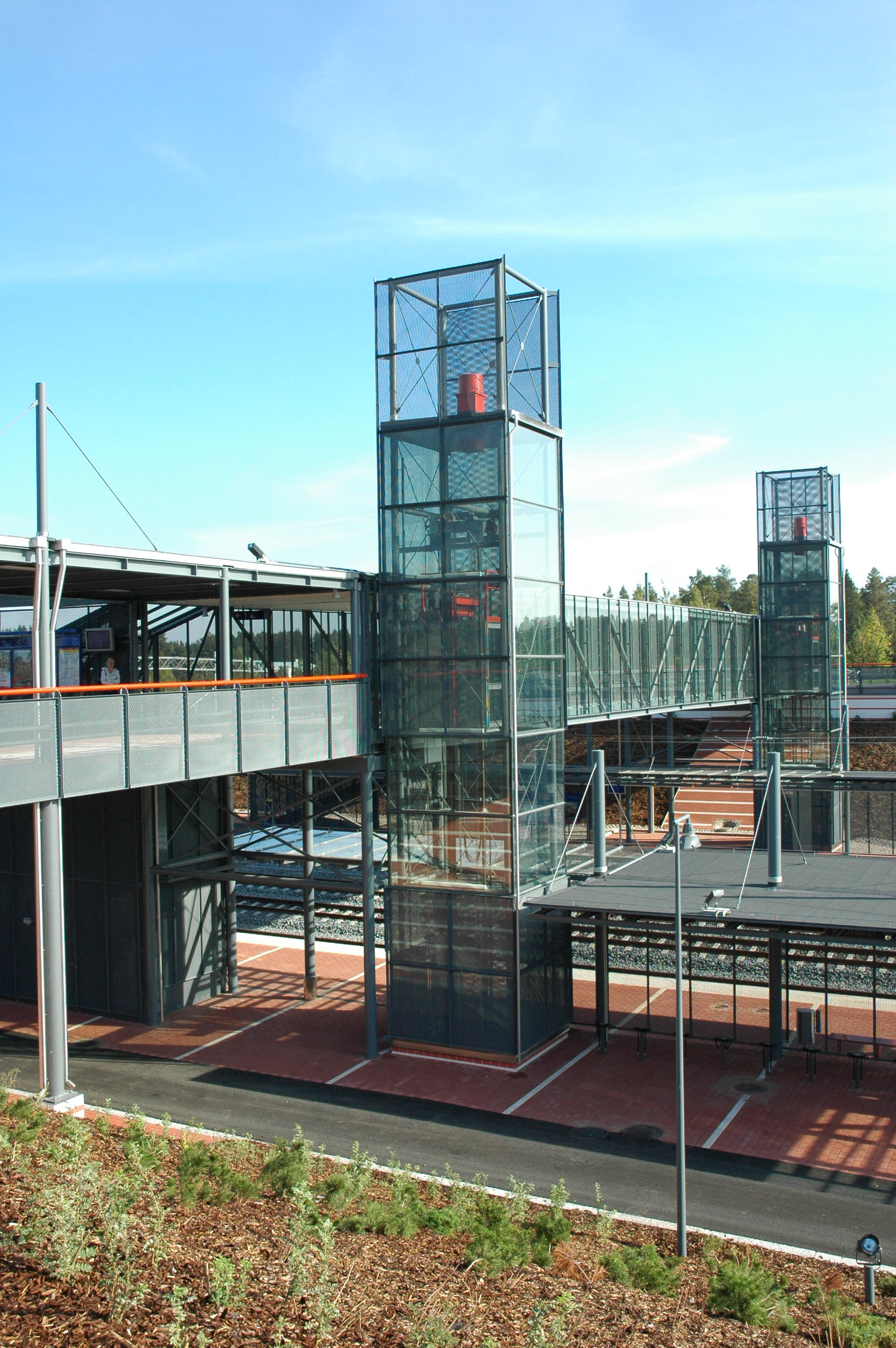
Mäntsälä railway station 2006

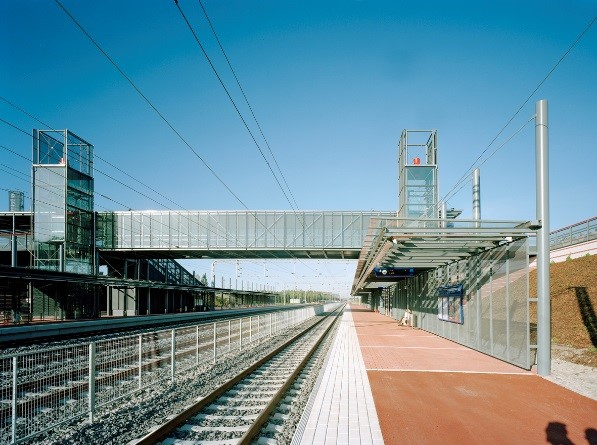
Mäntsälä railway station 2006

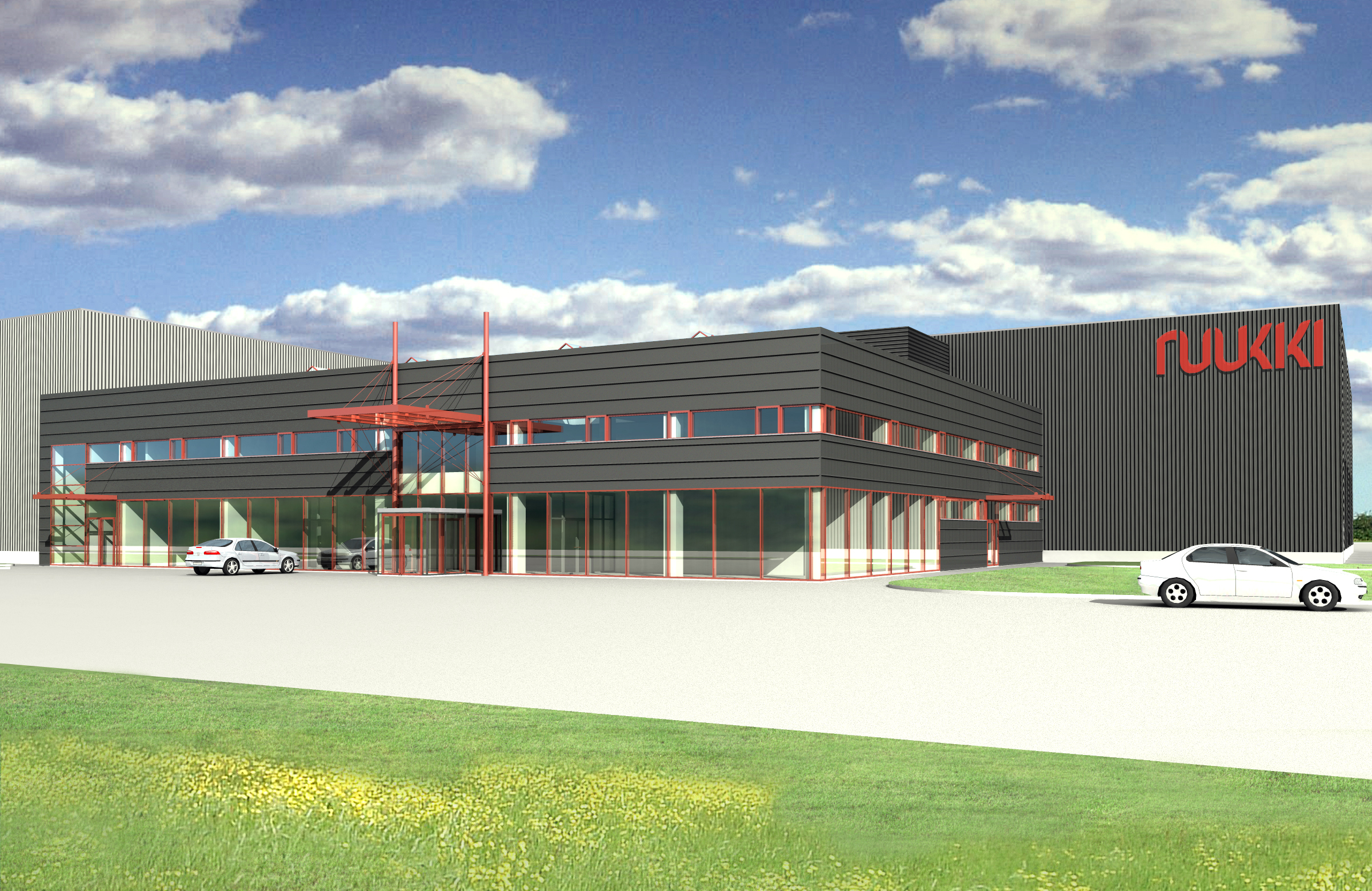
Ruukki Factory, Bolintin Deal, Romania 2008

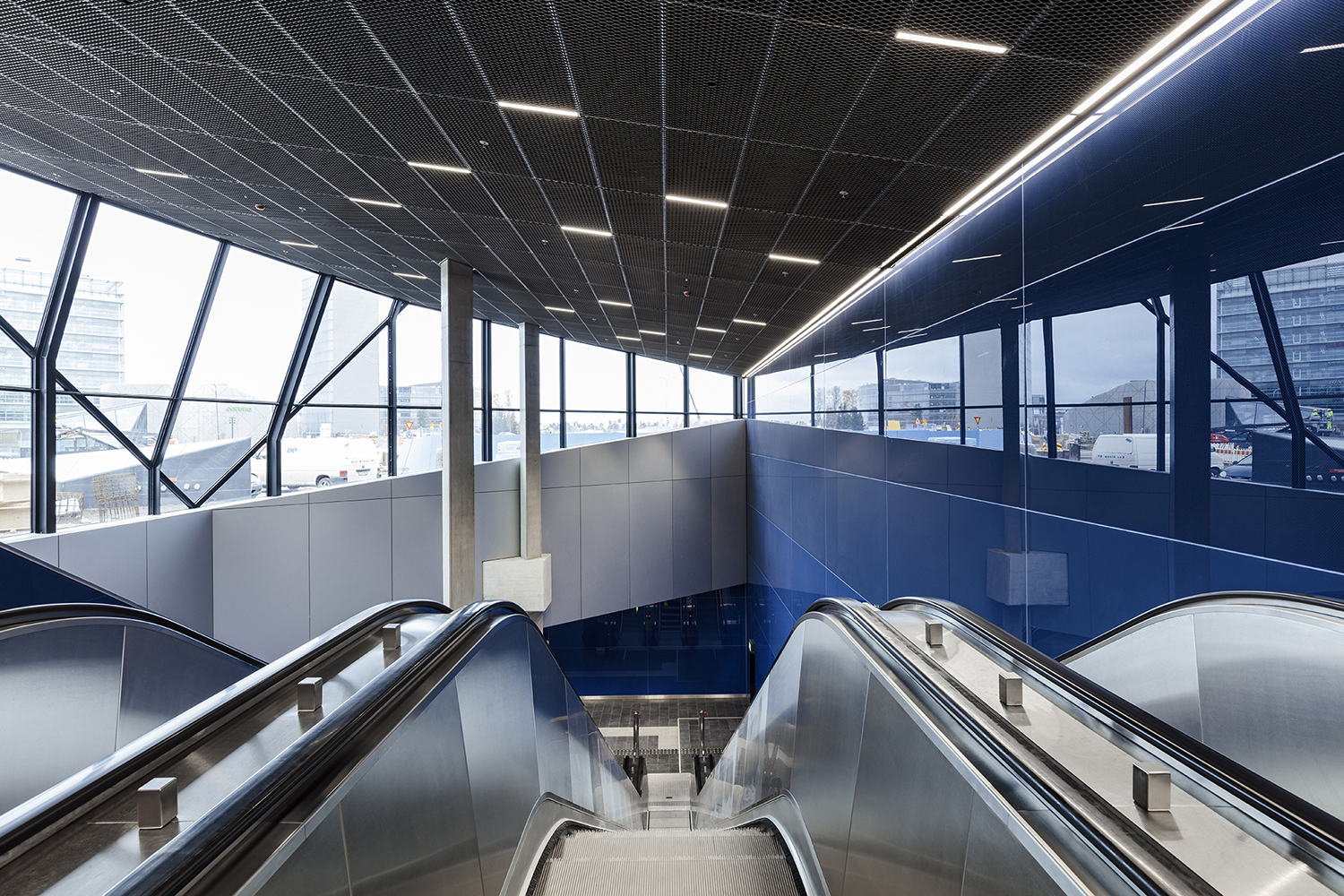
Keilaniemi metro station, Espoo (ALA+ESA) 2009-2017

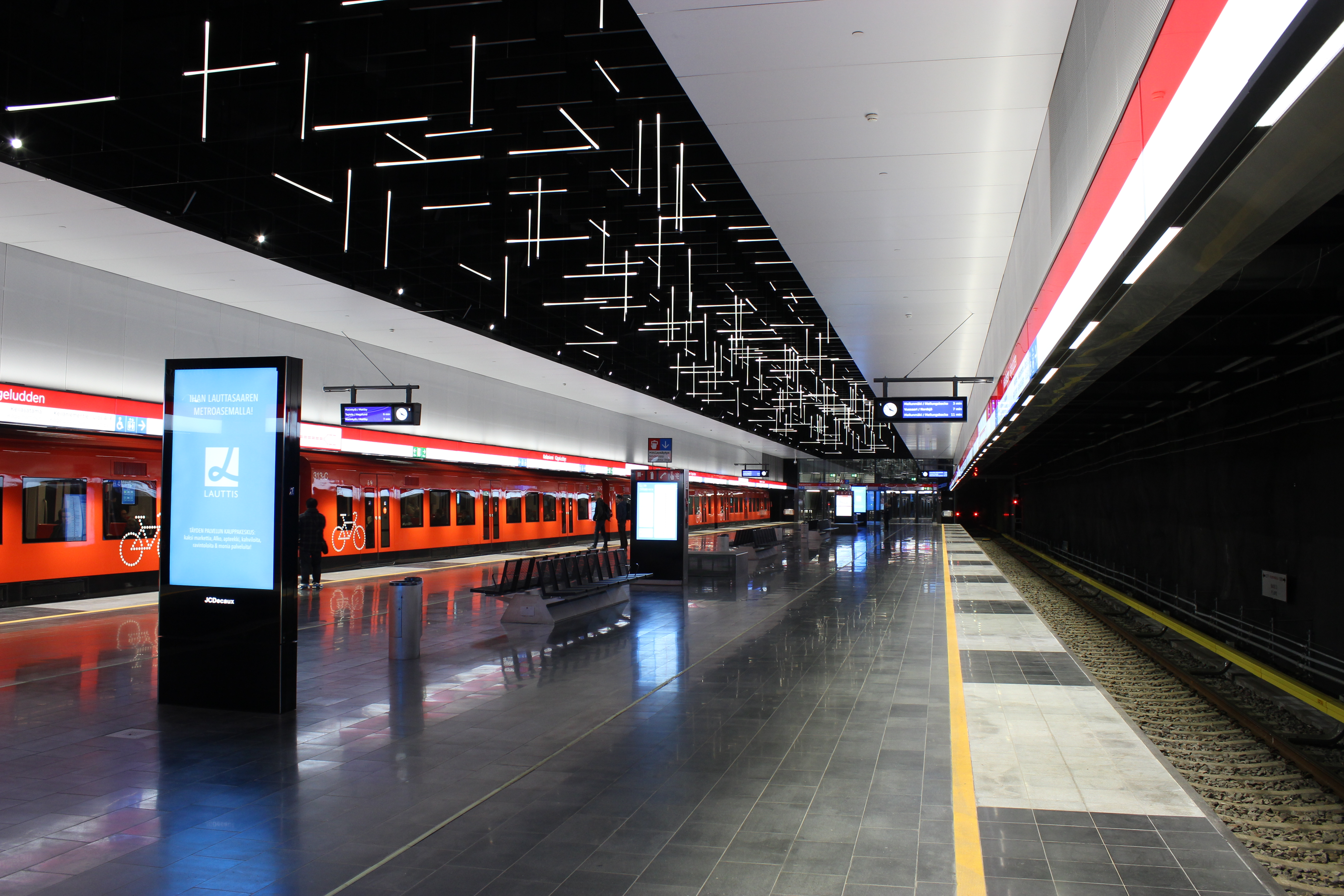
Keilaniemi metro station, Espoo (ALA+ESA) 2009-2017

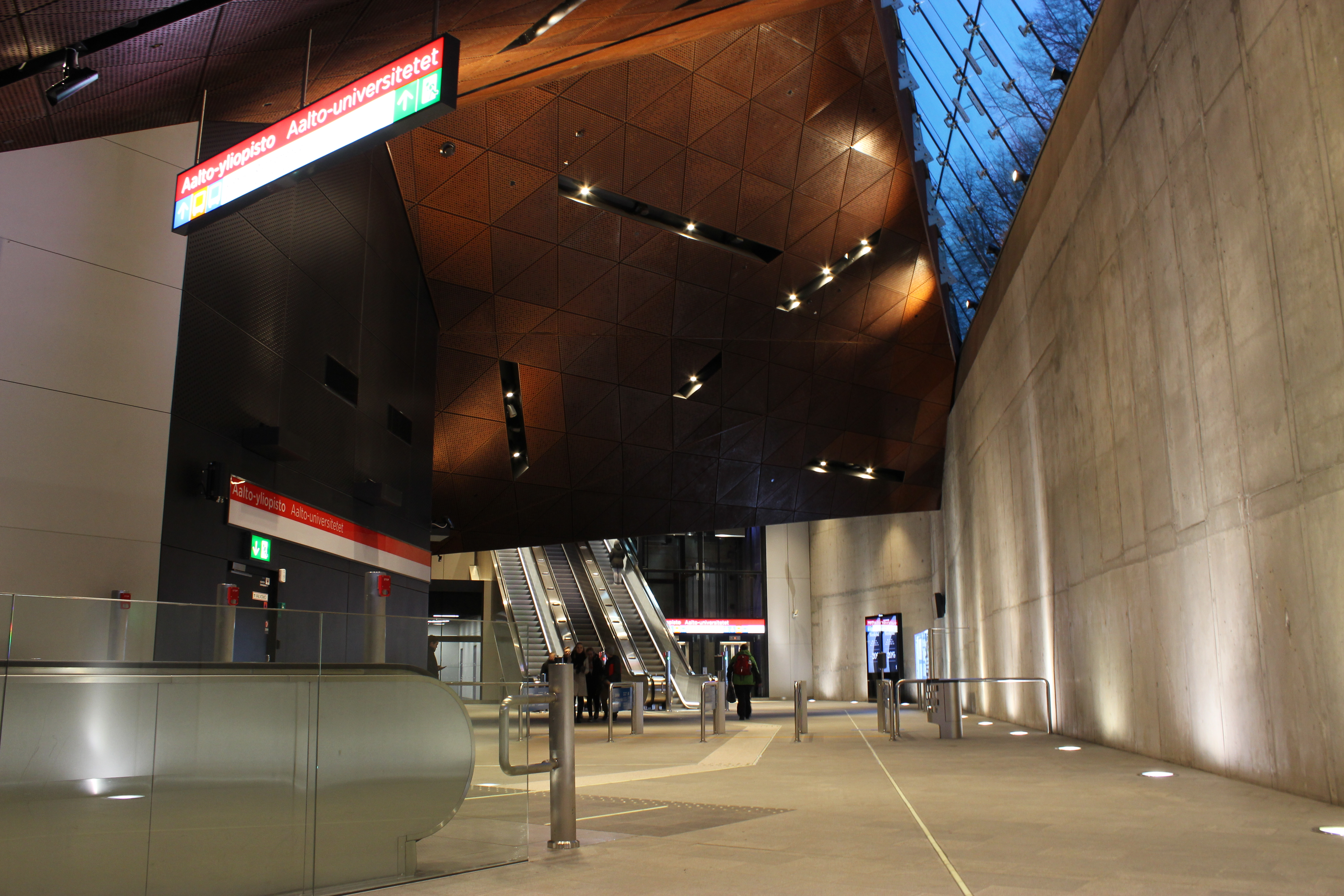
Aalto University (Otaniemi) metro station, Espoo (ALA+ESA) 2009-2017

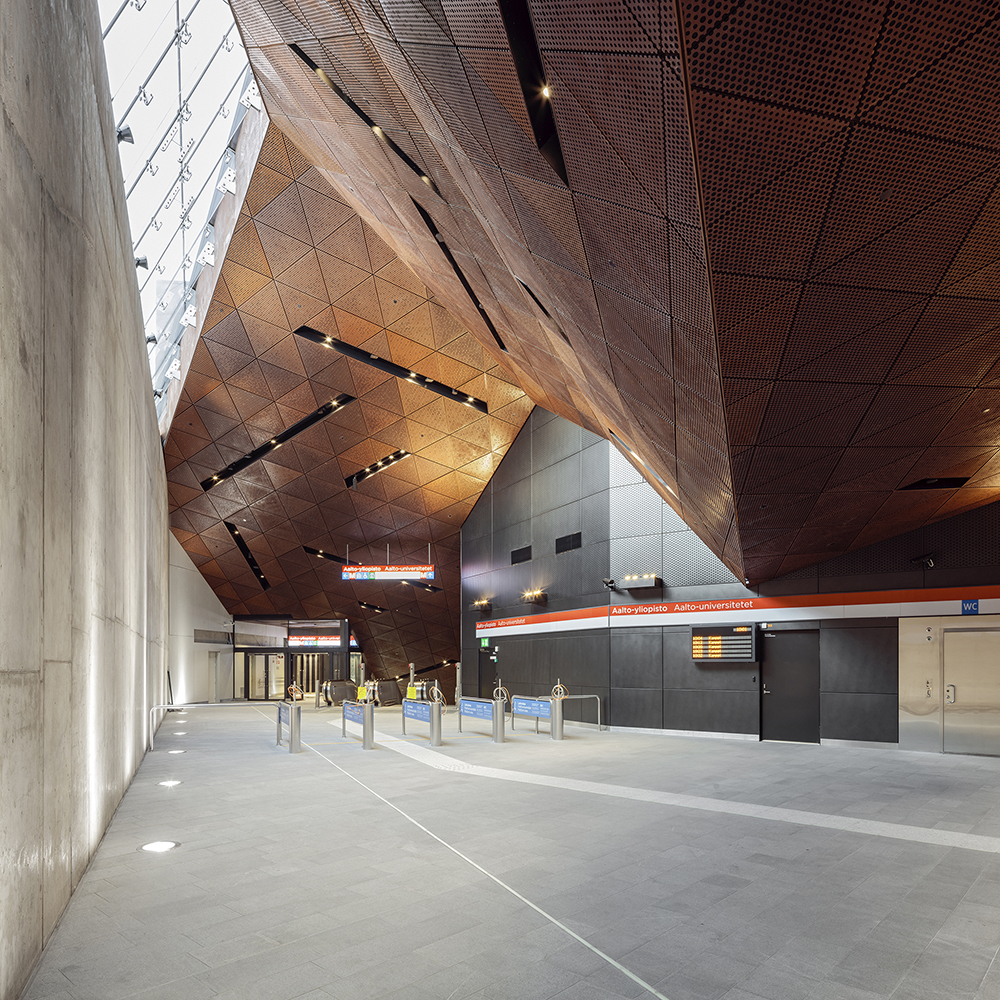
Aalto University (Otaniemi) metro station, Espoo (ALA+ESA) 2009-2017

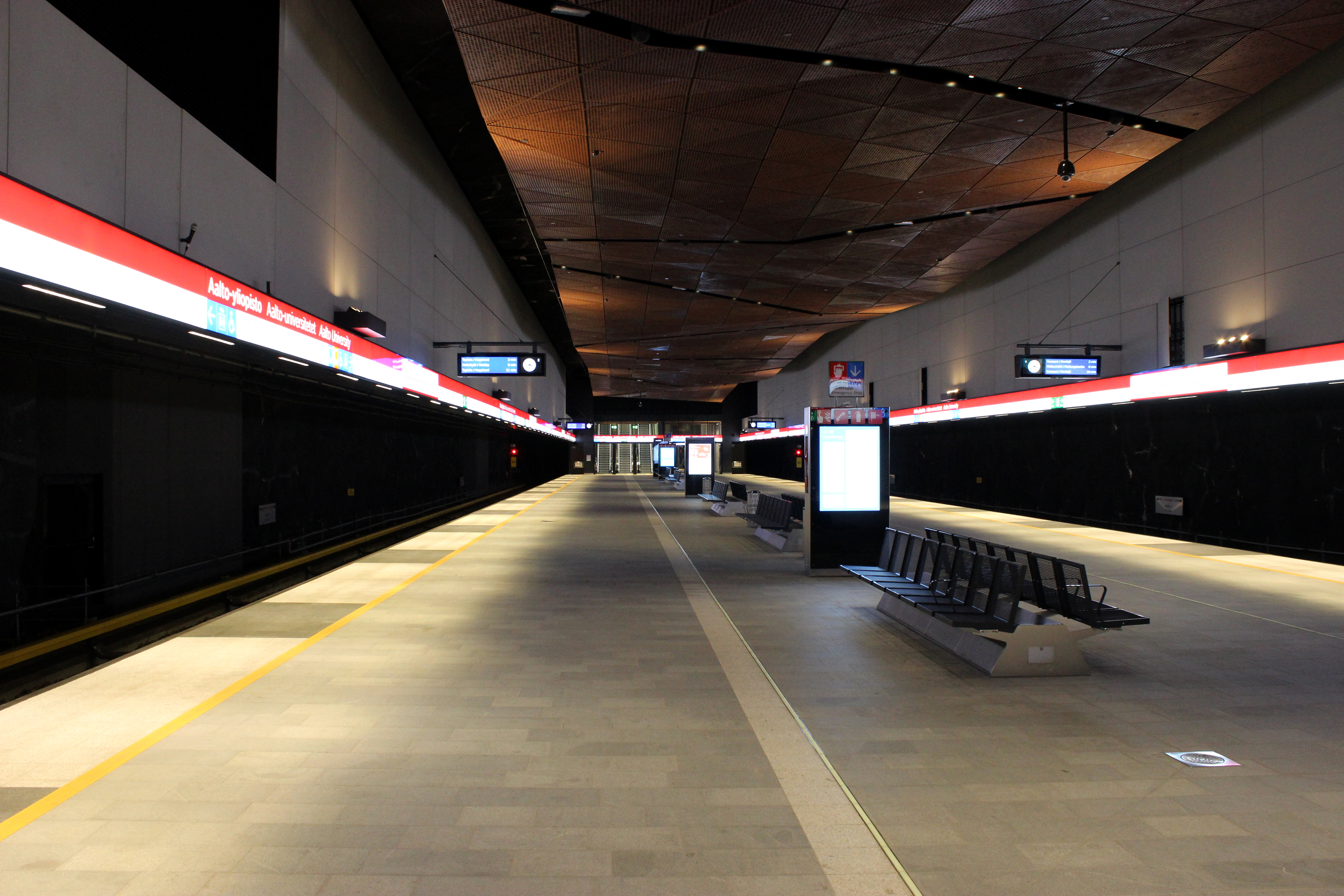
Aalto University (Otaniemi) metro station, Espoo (ALA+ESA) 2009-2017

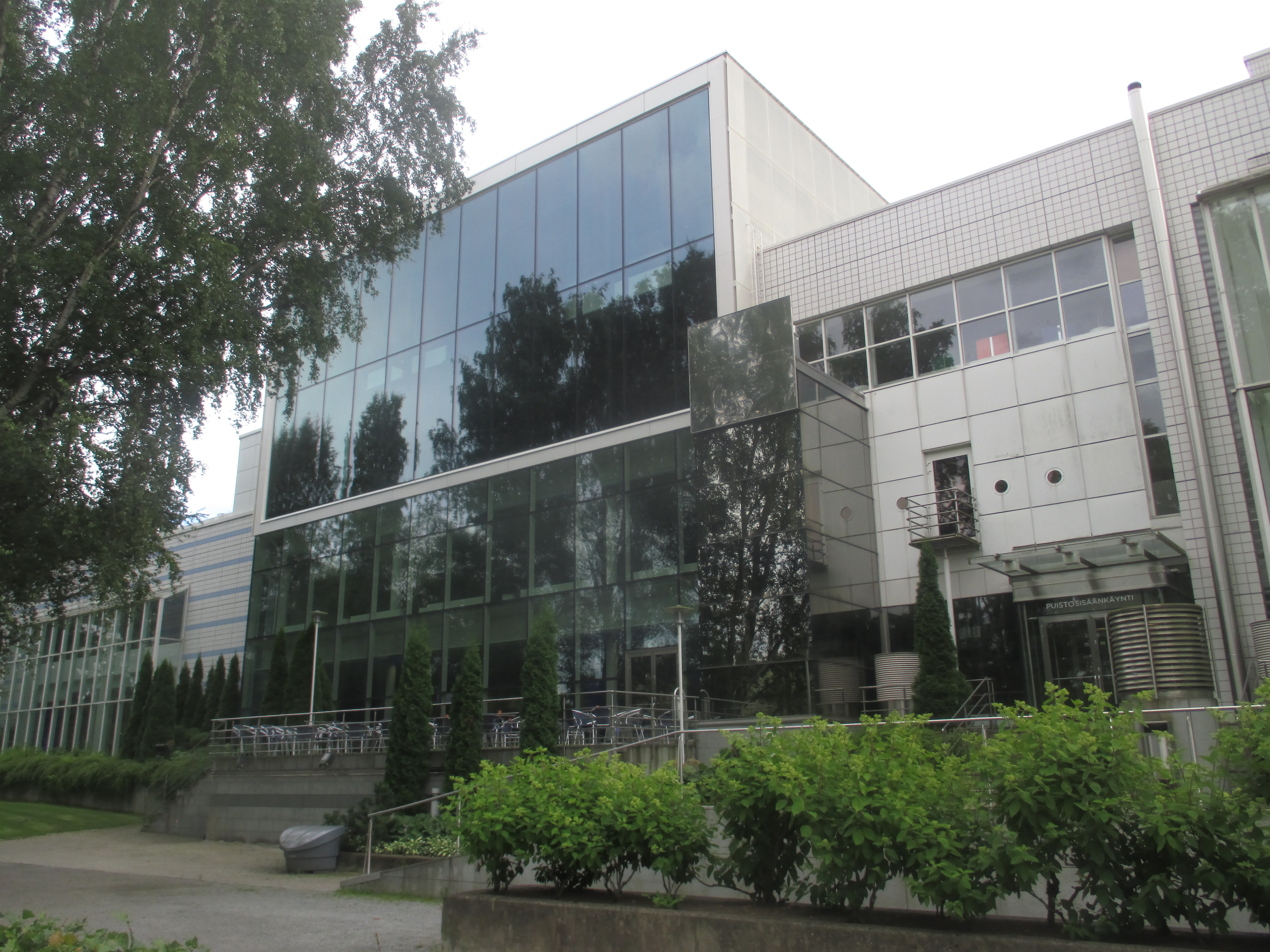
Tampere Hall, renovation and annex 2015-2017

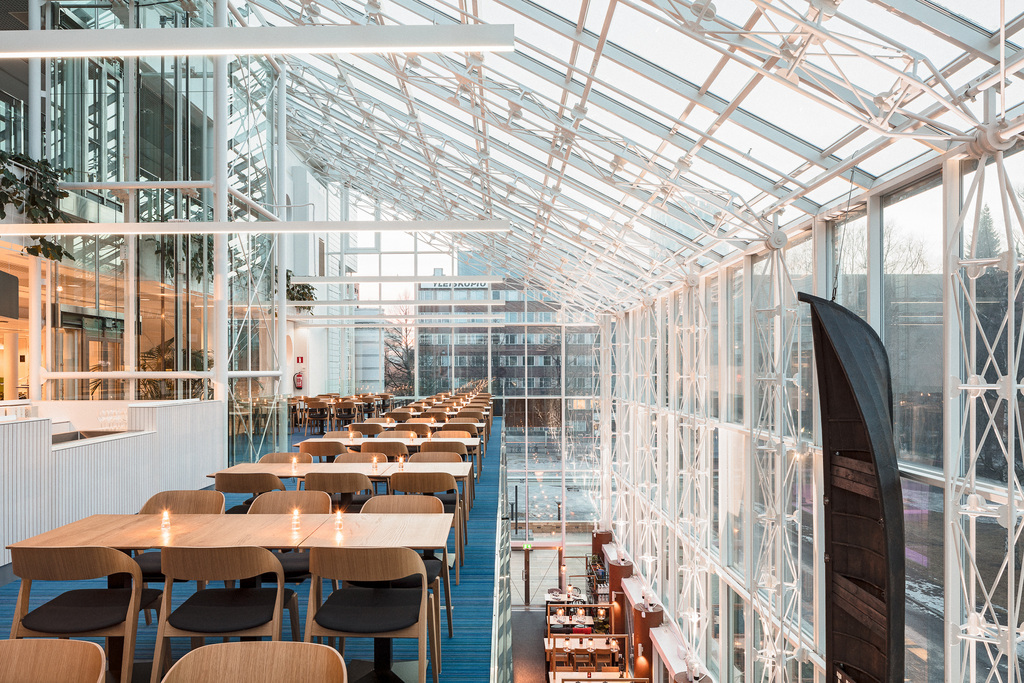
Tampere Hall, renovation and annex 2015-2017

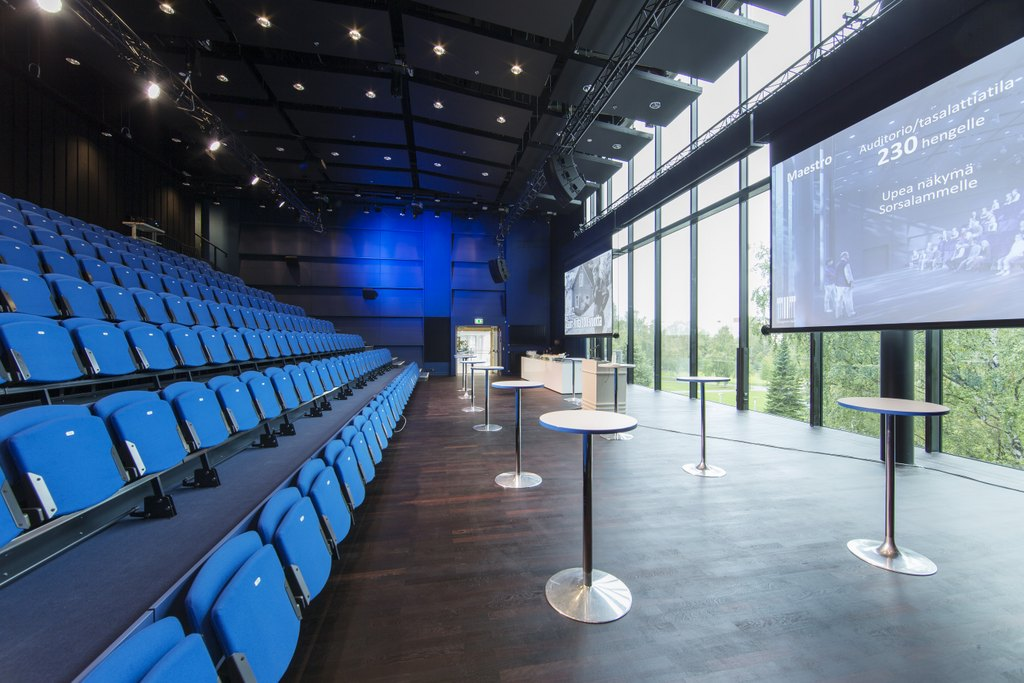
Tampere Hall, renovation and annex 2015-2017

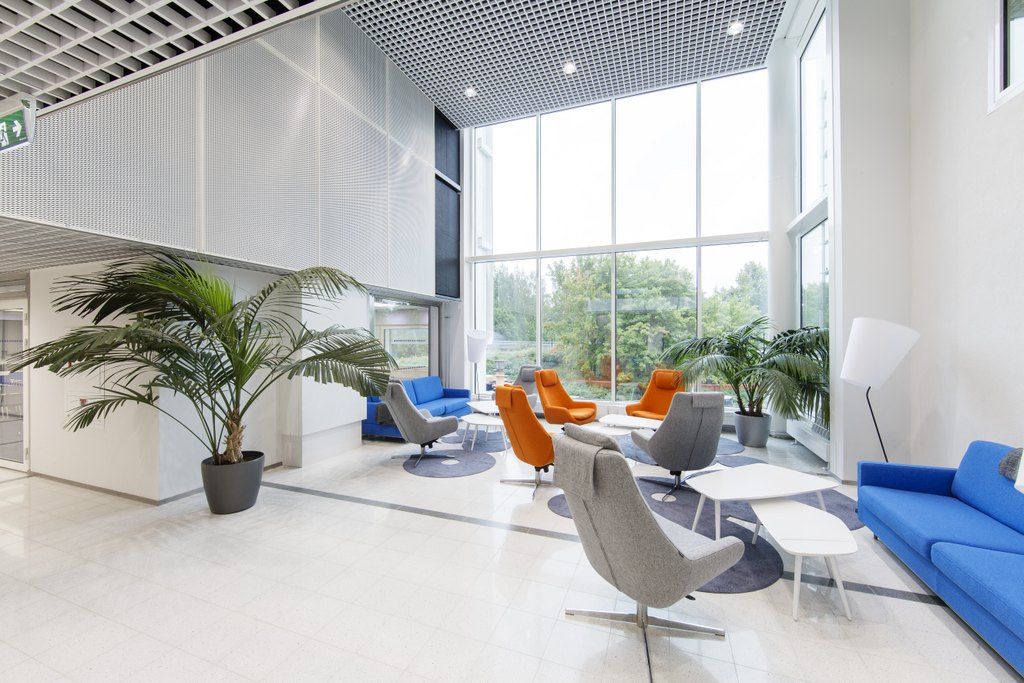
Tampere Hall, renovation and annex 2015-2017

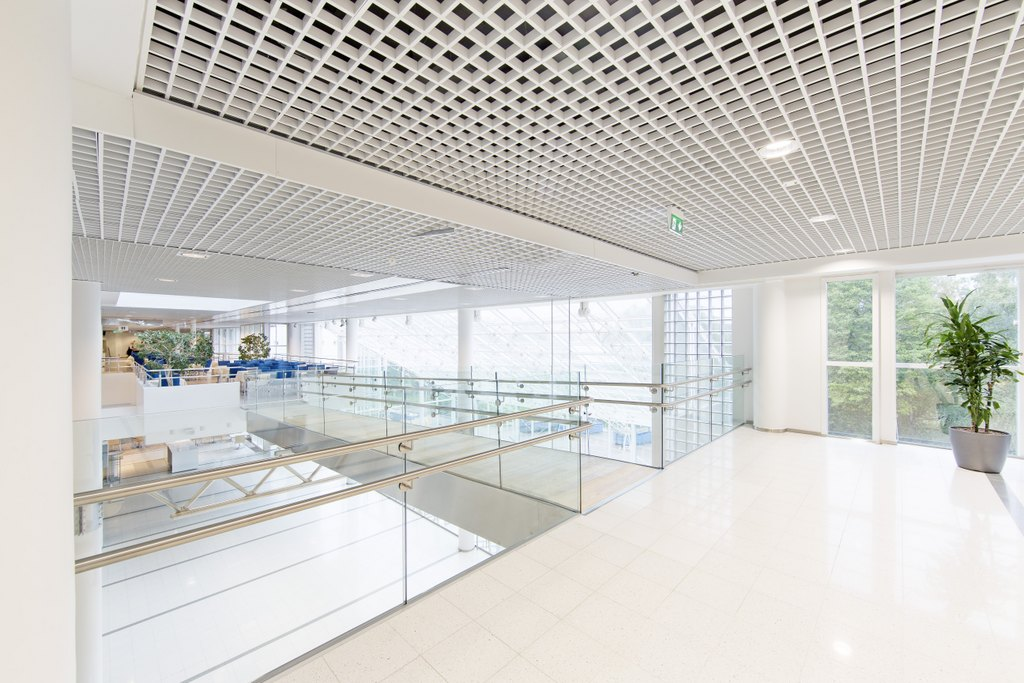
Tampere Hall, renovation and annex 2015-2017

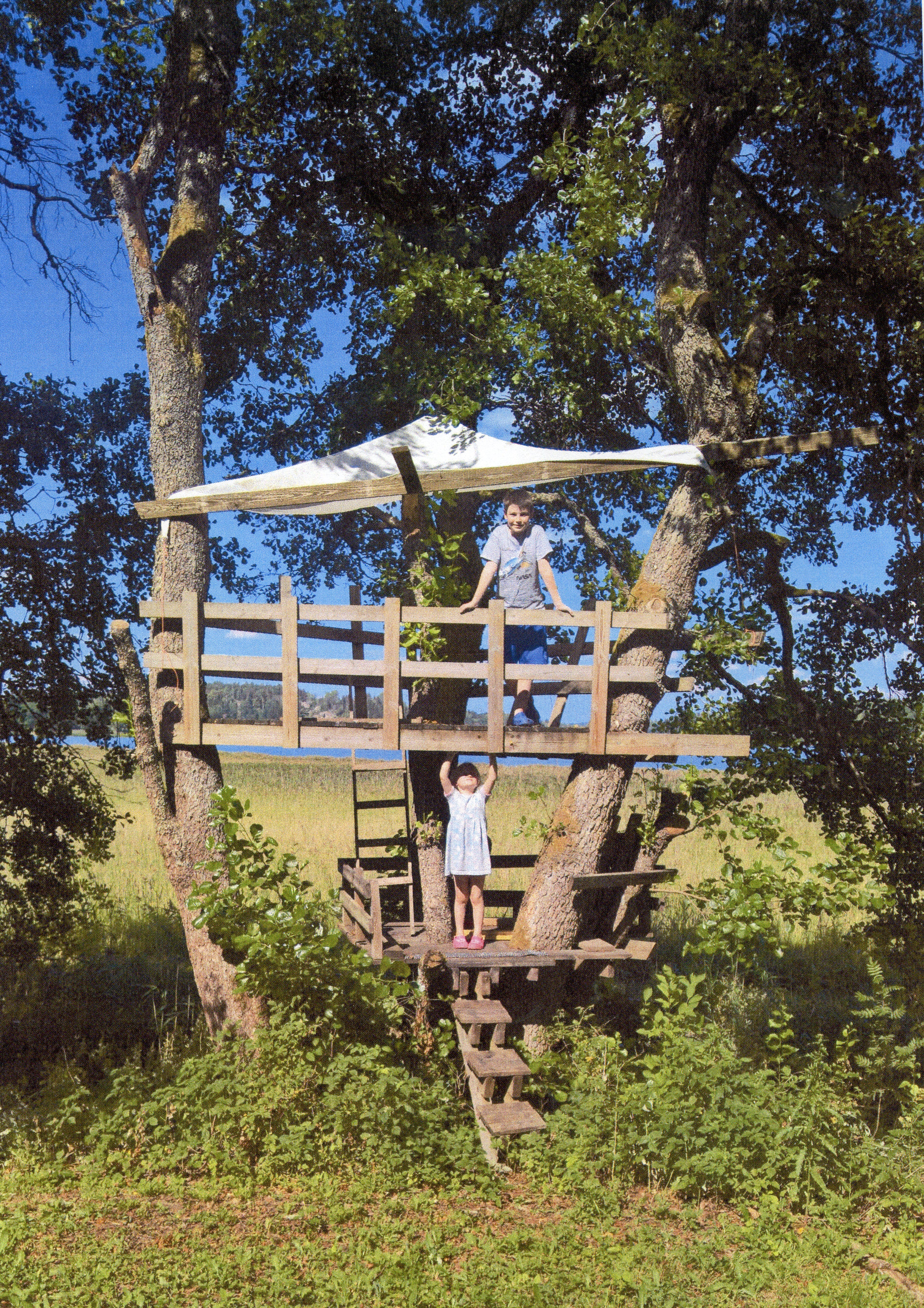
Tree House, Björköholmen, Pargas 2011-
