= Finn (ethnonym) =

Ethnic group name

The name Finn is an ethnonym that in ancient times usually referred to the Finnish people, Baltic Finnic peoples and Sámi peoples, but now refers almost exclusively to the Finns.

The probable cognates like Fenni, Phinnoi, Finnum, and Skrithfinni / Scridefinnum first appear in a few written texts starting from about two millennia ago in association with peoples of northern Europe, possibly the Sámi. The Icelandic Eddas and Norse sagas (11th to 14th centuries), some of the oldest written sources probably originating from the closest proximity, use words like finnr and finnas inconsistently. However, most of the time they seem to mean northern dwellers with a mobile life style.

Current linguistic research supports the hypothesis of an etymological link between the Finnish and the Sami languages and other modern Uralic languages.

It also supports the hypothesis of a common etymological origin of the toponyms Sápmi (Northern Sami for 'Lapland') and Suomi (Finnish for 'Finland') and the Finnish and Sami names for the Finnish and Sami languages (suomi and saame). Current research has disproved older hypotheses about connections with the names Häme (Finnish for 'Tavastia') and Proto-Baltic *žeme / Slavic землꙗ (zemlja) meaning 'land'. This research also supports the earlier hypothesis that the designation Suomi started out as the designation for Southwest Finland (Finland Proper, Varsinais-Suomi) and later for their language and later for the whole area of modern Finland. But it is not known how, why, and when this occurred. Petri Kallio had suggested that the name Suomi may bear even earlier Indo-European echoes with the original meaning of either "land" or "human", but he has since disproved his hypothesis.

The etymology is somewhat uncertain, but the consensus seems to be that it is related to Old Norse finna, from proto-Germanic *finþanan ('to find'), the logic being that the Sámi, as hunter-gatherers "found" their food, rather than grew it. This etymology has superseded older speculations that the word might be related to fen.

Finn is an exonym, a name that other peoples have used of the Sámi and the Finns, but which they themselves have not used.

== Fenni, Phinnoi and Skridfinnar ==
The Fenni are first mentioned by Cornelius Tacitus in Germania in 98 A.D. Their location is uncertain, due to the vagueness of Tacitus' account: "The Venedi overrun in their predatory excursions all the woody and mountainous tracts between the Peucini and the Fenni". The Greco-Roman geographer Ptolemy, who produced his Geographia in ca. 150 AD, mentions a people called the Phinnoi (Φιννοι), generally believed to be synonymous with the Fenni. He locates them in two different areas: a northern group in northern Scandia (Scandinavia), then believed to be an island; and a southern group, apparently dwelling to the East of the upper Vistula river (SE Poland). It remains unclear what was the relationship between the two groups. From 5th century onwards, a new term, skriðifinnoz, 'skiing Finn', is applied to the Sámi. In the 6th century, the Byzantine historian Procopius describes the people of Thule, interpreted to mean the Scandinavian peninsula. Procopius' list includes Scrithiphini, which he describes as hunters. From the same period, the chronicler Jordanes describes a hunter-gatherer people called screrefennae in his Getica. In his description of the island of Scandza (Scandinavia), he mentions three groups with names similar to Ptolemy's Phinnoi, the Screrefennae, Finnaithae and mitissimi Finni ("softest Finns"). The Screrefennae is believed to mean the "skiing Finns" and are generally identified with Ptolemy's northern Phinnoi and today's Finns. The Finnaithae have been identified with the Finnveden of southern Sweden. It is unclear who the mitissimi Finni was.

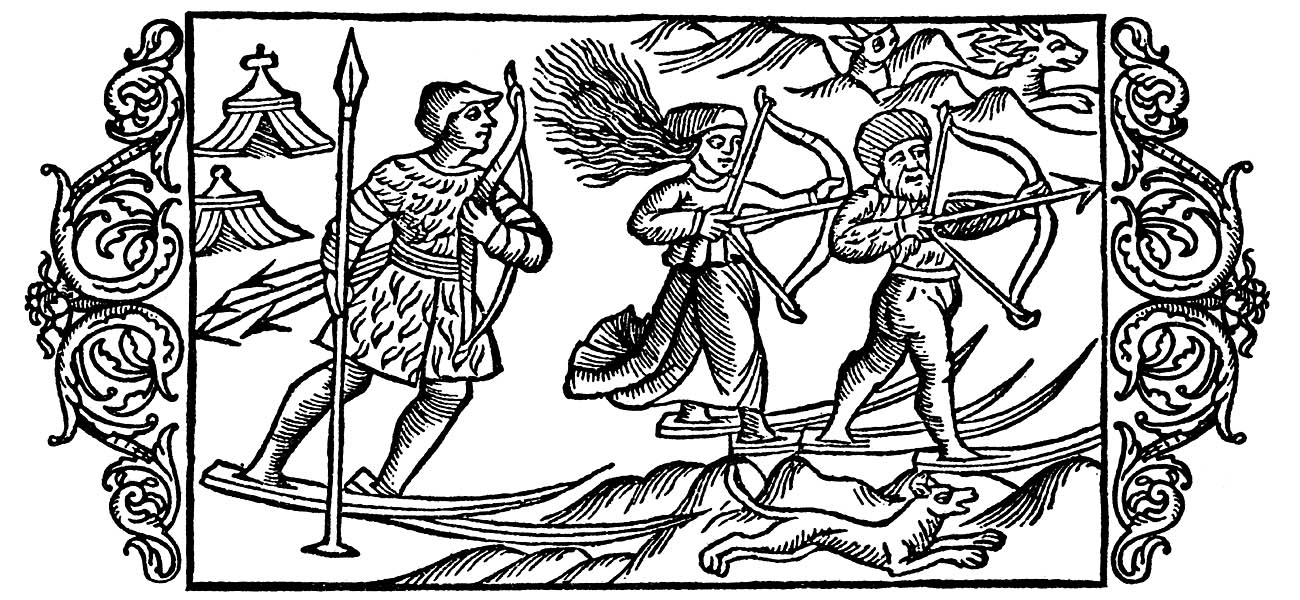
Woodcut from Olaus Magnus' Historia de gentibus septentrionalibus (1555) depicting Skrickfinns

== Finnar in Old Norse Sagas ==
The Icelandic Eddas and Norse sagas (11th to 14th centuries), some of the oldest written sources probably originating from the closest proximity, use words like finnr and finnas inconsistently. However, most of the time they seem to mean northern dwellers with a mobile life style.

As Old Norse gradually developed into the separate Scandinavian languages, Swedes apparently took to using Finn to refer to inhabitants of what is now Finland, while the Sámi came to be called Lapps. In Norway, however, Sámi were still called Finns at least until the modern era (reflected in toponyms like Finnmark, Finnsnes, Finnfjord and Finnøy), and some northern Norwegians will still occasionally use Finn to refer to Sámi people, although the Sámi themselves now consider this to be an inappropriate term. Finnish immigrants to Northern Norway in the 18th and 19th centuries were referred to as Kvens to distinguish them from the Sámi "Finns". Ethnic Finns (suomalaiset) are a distinct group from Sámi.

== Finland ==
The first known use of this name to refer to the people of what is now Finland is in the 10th-century Old English poem "Widsith". Among the first written sources possibly designating western Finland as the "land of Finns" are also two rune stones in Sweden: one in Norrtälje Municipality, with the inscription fin·lonti (U 582), and the other in Gotland, with the inscription finlandi (G 319), dating from the Viking Age and the 13th century respectively.

== As an ethnological classification ==
In the 18th to early 20th century ethnological literature, Finns is often used in an extended sense, referring not only to Finns of Finland, but also to other Finno-Ugric (Uralic) speaking peoples.

== Etymology ==
It has been suggested that the non-Uralic ethnonym "Finn" is of Germanic language origin and related to such words as finthan (Old High German) 'find', 'notice'; fanthian (Old High German) 'check', 'try'; and fendo (Old High German) and vende (Middle High German) 'pedestrian', 'wanderer'. It may thus have originated from an Old Norse word for hunter-gatherer, finn (plural finnar), which is believed to have been applied during the first millennium CE to the (pre–reindeer herding) Sami, and perhaps to other hunter-gatherers of Scandinavia. It was still used with this meaning in Norway in the early 20th century, but is now considered derogatory. Thus there is Finnmark in Norway, which can be understood as "Sami country", but also Finnveden in Sweden, in an area that is not known to have been Finnic-speaking. The name was also applied to what is now Finland, which at the time was inhabited by "Sami" hunter-gatherers.

Current linguistic research supports the hypothesis of an etymological link between the Finnish and the Sami languages and other modern Uralic languages. It also supports the hypothesis of a common etymological origin of the toponyms Sápmi (Northern Sami for 'Lapland') and Suomi (Finnish for 'Finland') and the Finnish and Sami names for the Finnish and Sami languages (suomi and saame). Current research has disproved older hypotheses about connections with the names Häme (Finnish for 'Tavastia') and Proto-Baltic *žeme / Slavic землꙗ (zemlja) meaning 'land'. This research also supports the earlier hypothesis that the designation Suomi started out as the designation for Southwest Finland (Finland Proper, Varsinais-Suomi) and later for their language and later for the whole area of modern Finland. But it is not known how, why, and when this occurred. Petri Kallio had suggested that the name Suomi may bear even earlier Indo-European echoes with the original meaning of either "land" or "human", but he has since disproved his hypothesis.

Yet another theory postulates that the words finn and kven are cognates.
