= Finnic peoples =

Various groups of Finno-Ugric peoples

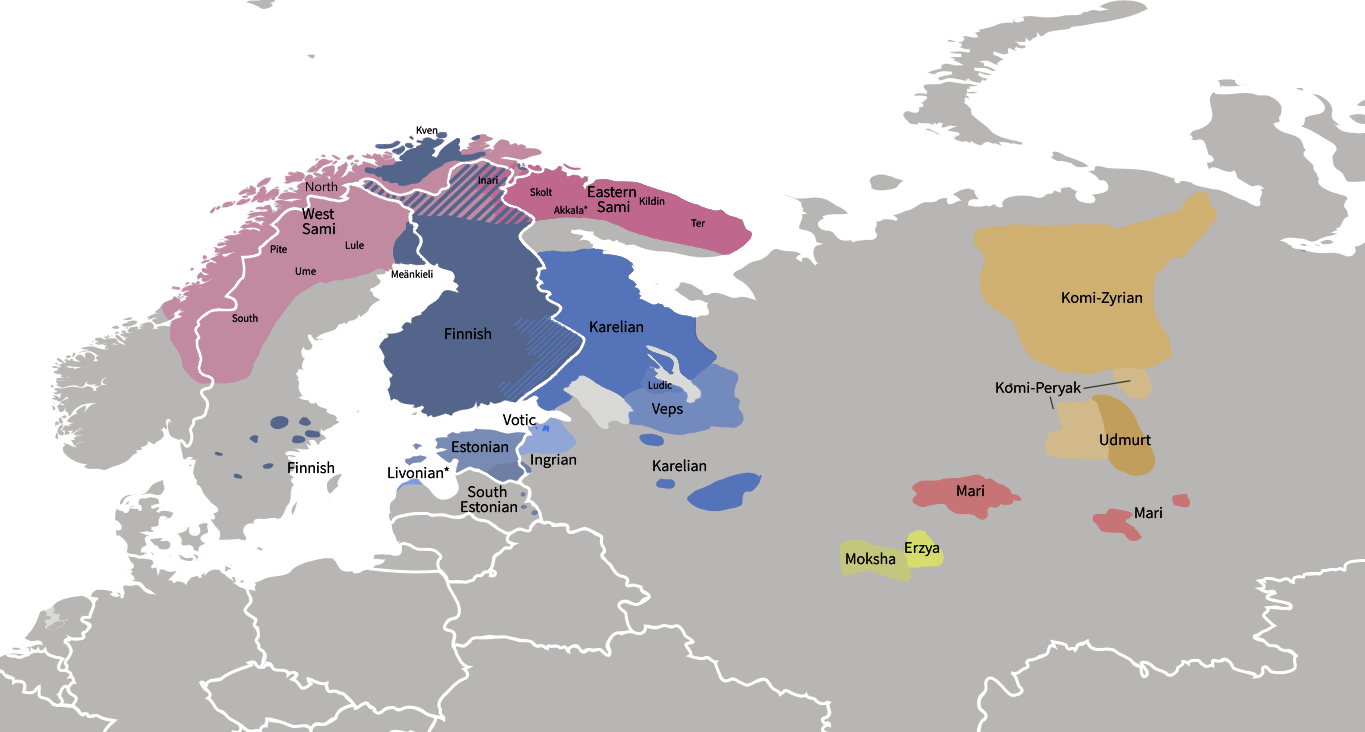
Modern Finnic nations identified by language (west to east): Pink: Sámi Blue: Baltic Finns Yellow and red: Volga Finns Brown: Perm Finns

The Finnic peoples, or simply Finns, are the nations who speak languages traditionally classified in the Finnic language family, and which are thought to have originated in the region of the Volga River. Currently, the largest Finnic peoples by population are the Finns (6 million), the Estonians (1 million), the Mordvins (800,000), the Mari (570,000), the Udmurts (550,000), the Komis (330,000) and the Sámi (100,000).

The scope of the term "Finnic peoples" (or "Finns") varies by context. It can be as narrow as the Baltic Finns of Finland, Scandinavia, Estonia, and Northwest Russia. In Russian academic literature, the term typically comprises the Baltic Finns and the Volga Finns, (Note: Includes the now-extinct Meryans, Meshcherans, and Muromians.) the indigenous peoples living near the Volga and Kama Rivers; the Perm Finns are sometimes distinguished as a third group. These eastern groups include the Finnic peoples of the Komi-Permyak Okrug and the four Russian republics of Komi, Mari El, Mordovia and Udmurtia. The broadest sense in the contemporary usage includes the Sámi of northern Fennoscandia as well. In older literature, the term sometimes includes the Ugrian Finns (the Khanty, Mansi and Hungarians), and thus all speakers of Finno-Ugric languages. Based on linguistic connections, the Finnic peoples are sometimes subsumed under Uralic-speaking peoples, uniting them also with the Samoyeds. The linguistic connections to the Hungarians and Samoyeds were discovered between the end of the eighteenth and beginning of the twentieth centuries.

Finnic peoples migrated westward from very approximately the Volga area into northwestern Russia and (first the Sámi and then the Baltic Finns) into Scandinavia, though scholars dispute the timing. The ancestors of the Perm Finns moved north and east to the Kama and Vychegda rivers. Those Finnic peoples who remained in the Volga basin began to divide into their current diversity by the sixth century, and had coalesced into their current nations by the sixteenth.

== Etymology ==
The name "Finn(ic)" is an ancient exonym that usually referred to the Sámi peoples, with scarce historical references and therefore rather questionable etymology. Its probable cognates, like Fenni, Phinnoi, Finnum, and Skrithfinni / Scridefinnum appear in a few written texts starting from about two millennia ago in association with peoples of northern Europe. The first known use of this name to refer to the people of what is now Finland is in the 10th-century Old English poem "Widsith". Among the first written sources possibly designating western Finland as the "land of Finns" are also two rune stones in Sweden: one in Norrtälje Municipality, with the inscription finlont (U 582), and the other in Gotland, with the inscription finlandi (G 319 M), dating from the 11th century.

It has been suggested that the non-Uralic ethnonym "Finn" is of Germanic language origin and related to such words as finthan (Old High German) 'find', 'notice'; fanthian (Old High German) 'check', 'try'; and fendo (Old High German) and vende (Middle High German) 'pedestrian', 'wanderer'. It may thus have originated from an Old Norse word for hunter-gatherer, finn (plural finnar), which is believed to have been applied during the first millennium CE to the (pre–reindeer herding) Sámi, and perhaps to other hunter-gatherers of Scandinavia. It was still used with this meaning in Norway in the early 20th century, but is now considered derogatory. Thus there is Finnmark in Norway, which can be understood as "Sámi march", but also Finnveden in Sweden, in an area that is not known to have been Finnic-speaking. The name was also applied to what is now Finland, which at the time was inhabited by "Sámi" hunter-gatherers.

The Icelandic Eddas and Norse sagas (11th to 14th centuries), some of the oldest written sources probably originating from the closest proximity, use words like finnr and finnas inconsistently. However, most of the time, they seem to mean northern dwellers with a mobile life style.

Other etymological interpretations associate the ethnonym "Finns" with fen in a more toponymical approach. Yet another theory postulates that the words finn and kven are cognates.

== See also ==
- Chud
- Fenni
- Finnic mythologies
