= Early Finnish wars =

Conflicts involving Finnish tribes

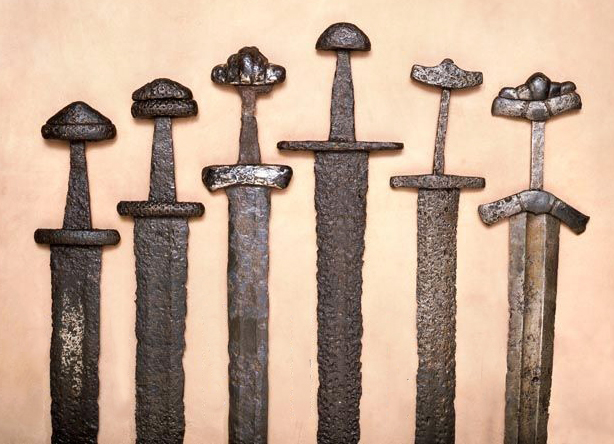
Late Iron Age swords from Finland.

There are scattered descriptions of early Finnish wars, conflicts involving the Finnish people, some of which took place before the Middle Ages. The earliest historical accounts of conflicts involving Finnish tribes, such as Tavastians, Karelians, Finns proper and Kvens, have survived in Icelandic sagas and in German, Norwegian, Danish and Russian chronicles as well as in Swedish legends and in birch bark manuscripts. The most important sources are the Novgorod First Chronicle, the Primary Chronicle and Erik's Chronicle.

Fortifications are known from Finland already from the Stone Age onwards. In Yli-Ii by the Iijoki river is located the Kierikki Stone Age fortress, which was built on piles and fortified with palisade. Also the approximately 40 Giant's Churches from the Neolithic period (3500–2000 BCE) found from the northwest coast of Finland may have served as fortifications. Bronze Age hillforts have also been found from Finland, such as Hautvuori in Laitila and Vanhalinna in Lieto. According to archeological finds belligerence and military hierarchy were emphasized in Finland in the Merovingian period. Hillforts get more common from Iron Age forward. According to the earliest historical documents in the Middle Ages Finnic tribes around the Baltic Sea were often in conflict with each other as well as against other entities in the area.

The oldest historical traces of conflicts in Finland are runestones GS 13 and U 582 which are dated to the early 11th century. Runestones are commemorating Vikings killed in Finland. Runestone G 319, which is dated to the early 13th century, also mentions Viking killed in Finland.

== Early written sources ==
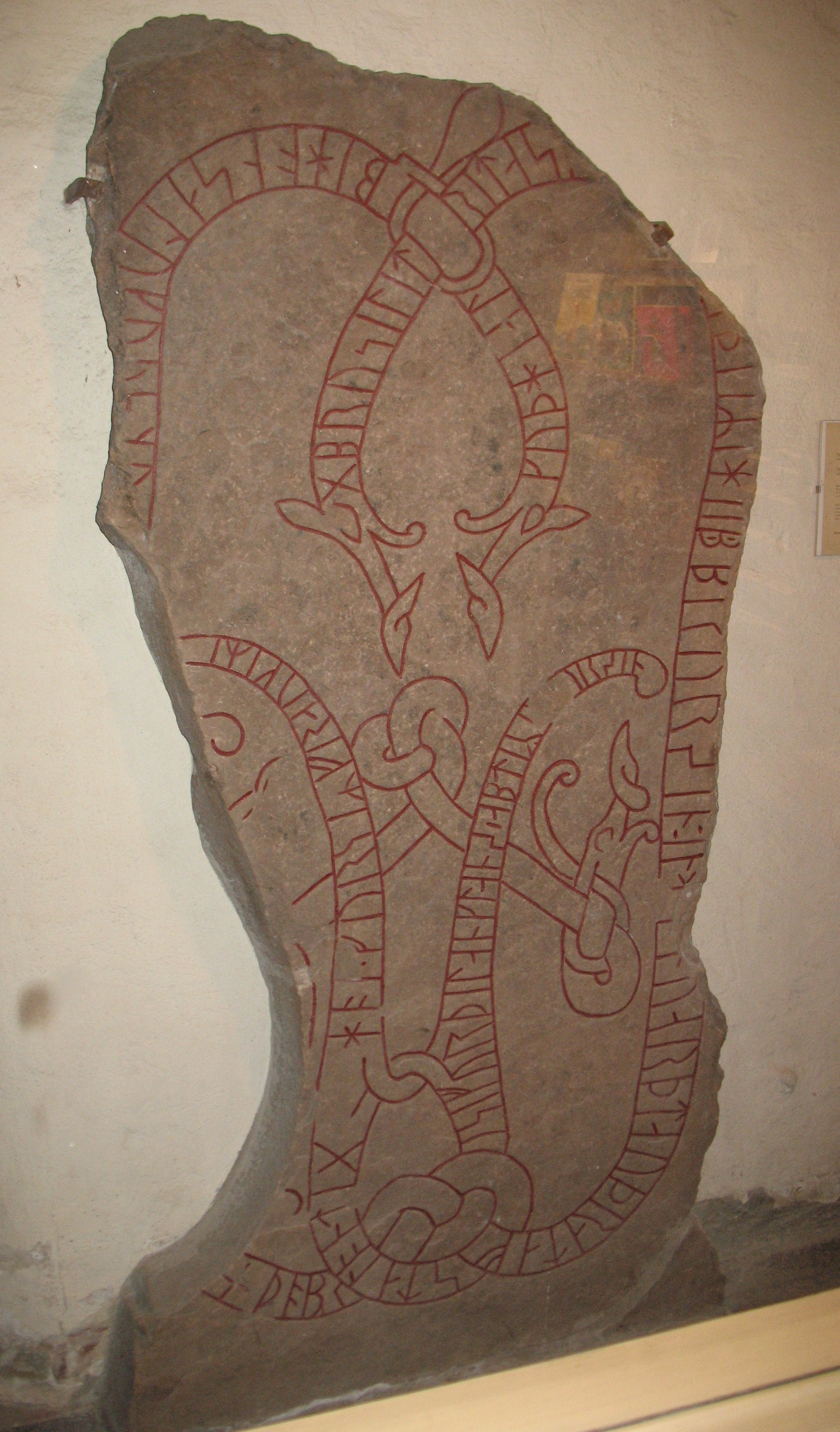
Runestone Gs 13 in Sweden from the 11th century was erected in memory of a Viking who was killed in Tavastia in modern-day Finland.

Several medieval sagas, chronicles and other early historical sources mention wars and conflicts related to Finnish tribes and to Finland. Finland was probably the same as Terra Feminarum which was attacked by Sweden in the 1050s CE, as described in Gesta Hammaburgensis Ecclesiae Pontificum (transl. Deeds of Bishops of the Hamburg Church) by Adam of Bremen in 1075. According to the source, the attack ended in the Swedish defeat, and led to the death of the king's son who was in charge of the campaign. Information on the conflict is however convoluted.

Ynglingasaga written in early 13th century describes military expedition to Finland at the end of the 4th century by the Swedish king Agne. However, it is disputed whether the Old Norse concept of Finland refers to the present country of Finland; alternatively it could have meant the land of the Sámi.

Orkneyinga saga written around 1230 tells about Nor who travelled from Kvenland to Norway and took over the entire country. Based on the saga's internal chronologies, the war would have taken place on the 6th or 7th century CE. Another version of the saga, Hversu Noregr byggdist, however omits the Kvenland part completely.

Norna-Gests þáttr saga from the early 14th century tells that Kvens (probably referring to a group of Finns) were raiding in Sweden in the mid-8th century. In the late 9th century, king Eric Anundsson was said to have conquered Finland, with several other eastern countries. However, all other accounts of the king exclude Finland from his conquests. Norwegian Ohthere tells in the Old English Orosius from 890 that Norwegians and Kvens (Qwenas) were in conflict with each other from time to time.

The best-known Swedish war against Finland presumably took place in the 1150s known as the legendary First Swedish Crusade. Whether it ever actually happened, is however not certain as the information is based on the late 13th century legends. Sweden eventually took over Finland during the so-called Second Swedish Crusade around 1249 against Tavastians and the Third Swedish Crusade against Karelians in 1293. By the beginning of the 14th century, records of independent Finnish military activities ceased to surface.

Saga of Olaf Haraldson tells how the Saint Olaf himself, the King of Norway, plundered in Finland around 1008 and almost got killed at the Battle at Herdaler. Vague chronicle entries briefly mention Danish expeditions to Finland in the 1190s and 1202. Nothing is known about their results except what can be read from a papal letter from 1209 to the Archbishop of Lund which lets the reader understand the church in Finland be at least partly established by Danish efforts. According to Icelandic chronicles, Kvens were raiding in northern Norway in 1271.

Most of the historical sources mentioning Finns are the Finnish-Novogorodian wars described mainly in the Novgorod First Chronicle and in the Primary Chronicle. Some of these conflicts are also described in Sofia First Chronicle, the Nikon Chronicle and in the Laurentian Codex. Finnic groups and the Republic of Novgorod waged a series of wars between the 11th and 14th centuries. They probably contributed to the Finns' eventual subjugation to the Catholic Church and the Kingdom of Sweden.

== List of early Finnish wars and conflicts ==
Year	Conflict	Summary
Conflicts before the 11th century
4th century	Mythological king Agne makes expedition to Finland	Ynglingan saga tells of a campaign by the mythical Swedish king Agne to Finland. The Finnish army was led by a person whose name in the saga is translated to Froste.
7th century	Finns as mercenaries in Scandinavia	Finnish warriors served in the courts of Denmark and Uppland.
9th century	Kvens raid Sweden	Story of Norna-Gest tells of raids done by Kvens to Sweden. Ohthere of Hålogaland tells of skirmishes between Finns and Norwegians.
9th century	Mythological king Eric Anundsson makes campaigns to East	Heimskringla written in c. 1230 describes Eric Anundsson conquering for himself "Finland, Kirjalaland, Courland, Estonia, and the eastern countries".
c. 818	Finnish king Matul supports Bjarms against Danish king Ragnar Lodbrok	According to Saxo Grammaticus in Gesta Danorum Finnish king Matul supported Bjarms against Danish king Ragnar. Suomen kronikka dates the event to c. 818.
11th century
11th century	Viking raid on Finland	Runestone Gs 13 in Gävle describes the death of a Viking named Egil on a campaign to Tavastia led by Freygeirr sometime in the early 11th century.
1008	Battle at Herdaler	Olaf II of Norway is defeated by Finns somewhere in Uusimaa.
c. 1030–1050	Viking raid on Finland	Runestone U 582 describes Viking named Ótrygg killed in Finland. According to historian Unto Salo the raid was done between 1030 and 1050.
1042	Vladimir Yaroslavich makes expedition against Finns	The prince of Novgorod Vladimir Yaroslavich makes a campaign against Finns.
c. 1060–1080	Lithuanians make campaign against Karelians.	Birchbark manuscript 590 describes Lithuanians making a campaign against Karelians.
12th century
1123	Vsevolod of Pskov makes campaign against Finns	The prince of Novgorod Vsevolod of Pskov makes a campaign in spring during the fasting against Finns.
1142	Finns make campaign against Novgorod	Finns make a campaign against Novgorod and Ladoga and are defeated.
1143	Karelians make campaign against Tavastians	Karelians attack against Tavastians via sea, but escape after losing two ships.
1149	Finns make campaign against Votes	Finns make campaign with few thousand men against Votes who are supported by Novgorod with 500 men.
1149	Karelians support Novgorod against Suzdalians	Karelians make a campaign with Novgorod and Pskovians against Suzdalians.
c. 1155	First Swedish crusade	Swedish king Eric IX and English clergyman Henry make possibly the first Swedish crusade to Finland against Finns proper.
1171 or 1172	Gravis Admodum	Pope Alexander III calls for capturing the possible fortifications of Finns proper in Gravis Admodum on 9. September, since every time they are not threatened by enemies they renounce Catholic Faith and return to Finnish Paganism.
1186	Vyshata Vasilevits makes campaign against Finns	Vyshata Vasilevits from Novgorod makes a campaign against Finns.
1187	Pillage of Sigtuna	Karelians (or Estonians or Curonians) pillage the city on 12 July. The Bishop of Uppsala and the Yarl are killed.
1191	Novgorod and Karelians campaign against Tavastians	Novgorod and Karelians make a campaign against Tavastians with ships.
1191	Danish crusade to Finland	Danes make a crusade to Finland.
13th century
1202	Danish crusade to Finland	Danes make a crusade to Finland which is led by the Archbishop of Lund Anders Sunesen and his Brother.
1221	The bishop of Finland attends to embargo against Novgorod	Pope Honorius III recommends on 13 January that the bishop of Finland, most likely Thomas, to organize embargo against Novgorod eventough it is unpleasant measure to Gotland and Hanseatic League.
1222	Norwegians attack Bjarmaland	Norwegians attack Bjarmaland.
1223	Karelians make expedition to Norway with Novgorod	Karelians make expedition against Norwegian settlements in northern Scandinavia with Novgorod.
1226	Karelians make another expedition to Norway with Novgorod	Karelians make another expedition against Norwegian settlements in northern Scandinavia with Novgorod.
1227	Yaroslav II makes campaign against Finns	Prince of Novgorod Yaroslav II makes a campaign against Finns.
1228	Finns make campaign against Novgorod	Finns make a campaign to ladoga with over 2000 men.
1229	Finns proper fight to eradicate Christianity from their lands	Pope Gregory IX condemns Gotland in his letter on 16 February for providing Finns proper with weapons, horses, ships and supplies which they use in their battle to eradicate Christian faith from their lands.
1237	Häme insurrection	Pope Gregory IX urge Catholic men to fight against Tavastians who have returned from Catholism to Finnish paganism in his letter on 9 December.
1240	Battle of the Neva	Swedes, Norwegians, Finns proper and Tavastians makes a campaign against Novgorod.
1241	Karelians ally with Novgorod against Germans in Koprye	Karelians, Ingrians and men from Staraya Ladoga participate in a campaign led by Alexander Nevsky against Germans in the castle of Koporye.
1249–1250	Second Swedish crusade	Second Swedish crusade to Finland against Tavastians.
1253	Karelians make a raid against Germans	Karelians raid against Germans in the area of Narva.
1256	Alexander Nevskiy makes a campaign to Finland	Alexander Nevskiy makes a campaign to Finland after unsuccessful campaign of Finns proper, Tavastians and Swedes to Narva.
1257	Karelians make expedition to Sweden	Karelians make a devastating campaign to Sweden which lead King Valdemar to request Pope Alexander IV to commence a crusade against them.
1271	Karelians and Kvens make campaign to Norway.	Karelians and Kvens attack Hålogaland in Norway.
1278	Dmitry Alexandrovich makes campaign to Karelia	Prince of Novgorod Dmitry Alexandrovich decide to punish Karelians by conquering them.
1279	Karelians attack Hålogaland	Karelians slay three dozen people in Hålogaland including the king's official.
1283	Finns and Swedes make campaign to Neva and Ladoga.	Swedes and Finns make a campaign to Neva and Ladoga area.
1284	Germans make campaign to Karelia	German warlord Trunda makes campaign by boats and ships to Karelia via river Neva. His goal was the taxation of Karelians. Trunda and his men are defeated at the mouth of the river by Novgorodians with the men of Staraya Ladoga on the 9th of September.
1292	Novgorod makes a campaign to Finland	Novgorod makes a campaign to Finland.
1293	Third Swedish crusade	Third Swedish crusade to Finland against Karelians.
14th century
1302/3	Karelians campaign to Norway	Karelians campaign in or near Norway but are turned away by a large Norwegian army.
1318	Novgorod makes campaign to Finland	Novgorod makes campaign to Finland proper and burns the town of Turku.
1323	Treaty of Nöteborg	The Treaty of Nöteborg is signed 12 August. It divides Karelia between kingdom of Sweden and Novgorod.
1337	The Revolt of Käkisalmi	Karelians revolt against Novgorod in Käkisalmi due to heavy taxation by Lithuanian Narimantas whom Novgorod had assigned to rule Karelia.

== See also ==
- List of wars involving Finland
