= Finnic peoples (disambiguation) =

The Finnic or Fennic peoples may refer to:

- Baltic Finnic peoples, the Finno-Ugric peoples inhabiting the Baltic Sea region
- Finnic peoples in the broad sense, i.e. Sámi, the Baltic Finns, the Volga Finns and the Perm Finns

== See also ==
- Finnic languages
