= Aeningia =

Island mentioned by Pliny the Elder

Aeningia is an island mentioned in the Natural History by Pliny the Elder, written in the 1st century CE. According to Pliny, Aeningia was inhabited by Sarmatians (Sarmati), Veneti (Venedi), Sciri and Hirri, bordering Vistula. Aeningia was probably a corrupted form of Aestingia (Estland) and referred to the area of the present-day Baltic states and northern Poland.

Some early European historians interpreted the name as a corrupt form of Finland, constructing a hypothetical Latin name Finningia as the original name. This probably originated from Olaus Magnus who was the first to place Finningia olim regnum on the map in 1539 or from Jacob Ziegler, who placed Finlandia and Einingia next to each other in present-day southwestern Finland in 1532.
