= Etymology of Kainuu =

Origin of the name "Kainuu"

The name Kainuu historically referred to Ostrobothnia, especially to the northern coastal areas of the Gulf of Bothnia. The name is also used for the modern administrative region of Kainuu. The origin of the name has been debated among Finnish historians and linguists, largely due to a proposed connection with Kvenland, another historical region in Fennoscandia.

== Theory one: Swampy land ==
As a part of his theory about the origin of the name "kven", Jouko Vahtola, a professor of history at Oulu University, suggested that the name "kainuu" had the same origin. Vahtola constructed a hypothetical proto-Germanic word "*χwainō" that meant "swampy land" (related to English whin). *χwainō derives from Proto-Indo-European *ḱʷeyn-, so the borrowing might have happened early on, but there is no evidence that the word "kainuu" was ever used to mean "swampy land" in any Finnish dialect.

== Theory two: Hole ==
Jorma Koivulehto, Professor of Germanic Philology at the University of Helsinki, has proposed that "kainuu" was originally the same as "*gain-", a Germanic word for a hole or mouth. With the meaning "water-route" or "water-body", *Kainu- was originally a toponymic prefix in southwestern Finland, and during the Iron Age it was gradually established as the name of the land surrounding the northern coast of the Gulf of Bothnia. Linguistically this etymology is seen as more acceptable. The area originally known as Kainuu seems to have been the central part of Ostrobothnia where Karelians had access to the Gulf of Bothnia in the Middle Ages.

Noteworthy in this context is the word "kainu", which is used only in lower Satakunta in Finland. It had a completely different meaning, referring to the middle stake in a work sled, but also clearly derives from *gain-.

== Theory three: Sami background ==
There are words in Sami languages that sound similar to "kainuu". In North Samic, Gáidnu is a rope made of roots for boats or fishing nets; Gáidnulaŝ refers to a clumsy person; and Geaidnu is a road or a way. In a Saami dictionary of 1780, Kainolats had the meaning "Norwegian or Swedish man" while Kainalats had the meaning "Norwegian or Swedish woman", though it could also have the meaning "peasant". Helsingby or Torneå was referred to as Cainho. These words seem to stem from Proto-Samic keajnō, "road, way, means, method".
