= Finnish War (disambiguation) =

The term "Finnish war" can refer to any of the following:

- Early Finnish wars (4th-9th centuries)
- Finnish–Novgorodian wars (11th-13th centuries)
- Finnish War (1808-1809)
- Russo-Finnish wars
  - Finnish Civil War (1918)
  - Heimosodat (1918-1922)
  - Winter War (1939–1940)
  - Continuation War (1941-1944)

See also:

- Finnish war children
- Finnish war reparations to the Soviet Union
