= Finno-Norwegian War =

Finno-Norwegian War may refer to:

- Battle at Herdaler (1007–1008)
- Bjarmaland (1222)
- Finnish War (1808–1809)
