= Fenni =

Ancient natural people

Map of the Roman Empire and the barbarian nations of Europe at the time of Tacitus. The supposed residential areas of the Fenni were located between the Venedi and the Bastarni, or Peucini. The ranking is based on the writings of Tacitus.

The Fenni were an ancient natural people, first described by Publius Cornelius Tacitus in Germania in 98 CE.

== Ancient accounts ==
The Fenni are mentioned in a short reference in Tacitus' Germania: "The Venedi overrun in their predatory excursions all the woody and mountainous tracts between the Peucini and the Fenni". Because the woody and mountainous tracts (presumably the Roztocze highlands) were between the Fenni and the Peucini and because the Peucini lived on the northern side of the Carpathians, the location of the Fenni was thus to the southeast of the Venedi on the east side of the Sveebian (Germania) region (the Veiksel river as the border). The Greco-Roman geographer Ptolemy, who produced his Geographia in ca. 150 CE, mentions a people called the Phinnoi (Φιννοι), generally believed to be synonymous with the Fenni. He locates them in two different areas: a northern group in northern Scandia (Scandinavia) or Skoone in southern Sweden, then believed to be an island; and a southern group, apparently dwelling to the East of the upper Vistula river (SE Poland). It remains unclear what was the relationship between the two groups, but probably northern group meant Finnaithae in southern Sweden.

The next ancient mention of the Fenni/Finni is in the Getica of 6th-century chronicler Jordanes. In his description of the island of Scandza (Scandinavia), he mentions three groups with names similar to Ptolemy's Phinnoi, the Screrefennae, Finnaithae and mitissimi Finni ("softest Finns"). The Screrefennae is believed to mean the "skiing Finns" Laplanders, hardly ancestors of today´s Finns, although they are generally identified with Ptolemy's northern Phinnoi and today's Finns. The Finnaithae have been identified with the Finnveden of southern Sweden. It is unclear who the mitissimi Finni was. They are probably the ancestors of today's Finns.

== Ethno-linguistic affiliation ==
Tacitus was unsure whether to classify the Fenni as Germanic or Sarmatian. The vagueness of his account has left the identification of the Fenni open to a variety of theories. It has been suggested that the Romans may have used Fenni as a generic name, to denote the various non-Germanic (i.e. Balto-Slavic and Finno-Ugric) tribes of north-eastern Europe. Against this argument is the fact that Tacitus distinguishes the Fenni from other probably non-Germanic peoples of the region, such as the Aestii and the Veneti.

It has also been suggested that Tacitus' Fenni could be the ancestors of the modern Finnish people. Juha Pentikäinen writes that Tacitus may well have been describing the Sámi or the proto-Finns when referring to the Fenni, noting some archeologists have identified these people as indigenous to Fennoscandia. The context of Fenni has also included the Finnic Estonians throughout different interpretations. Nevertheless, according to some linguists, certain linguistic evidence may be interpreted supporting the idea of an archaic Indo-European dialect and unknown Paleo-European languages existing in north-eastern Baltic Sea region before the spread of Finno-Ugric languages like Proto-Sámi and Proto-Finnic in the early Bronze Age around 1800 BCE. However, in Tacitus's time (1st century CE) Finno-Ugric languages (Proto-Sámi and Proto-Finnic) were the main languages in northern Fennoscandia.

Another theory is that Tacitus' Fenni and Ptolemy's northern Phinnoi were the same people and constituted the original Sámi people of northern Fennoscandia, making Tacitus' description the first historical record of them, and the mention of two different "Phinnoi" groups may suggest that there was already a division between Finns and Sámi. But while this may seem a plausible identification for the Phinnoi of northern Scandinavia, it is dubious for Tacitus' Fenni. Tacitus' Fenni (and Ptolemy's southern Phinnoi) were clearly based in continental Europe, not in the Scandinavian peninsula, and were thus outside the modern range of the Sámi. Against this, there is some archaeological evidence that the Sámi range may have been wider in antiquity. Sámi place names are found as far as Southern Finland and Karelia

The uncertainties have led some scholars to conclude that Tacitus' Fenni is a meaningless label, impossible to ascribe to any particular region or ethnic group. But Tacitus appears to relate the Fenni geographically to the Peucini(Bastarnae) and the Venedi, albeit imprecisely, stating that the latter habitually raided the "forests and mountains" between the other two. Tacitus placed the Fenni, Venedi and Peucini in the same context both geographically but also ethnically. He also gives a relatively detailed description of the Fenni's lifestyle.

== Material culture ==
Fenni seems to have been a form of the proto-Germanic word *fanþian-, denoting "wanderers" or "hunting folk", although Vladimir Orel viewed its etymology as unclear and listed a couple of alternative proposals (i.e. a derivation from Proto-Celtic *þenn- "hill"). A relevant alternative is the proto-Germanic word fenni, meaning swamp. Consequently, Fenni can with good reason be placed in the Prypiat marshland east of the Vistula. It matches what Tacitus said about the location of the Fenni. Tacitus describes the Fenni as follows:

In wonderful savageness live the nation of the Fenni, and in beastly poverty, destitute of arms, of horses, and of homes; their food, the common herbs; their apparel, skins; their bed, the earth; their only hope in their arrows, which for want of iron they point with bones. Their common support they have from the chase, women as well as men; for with these the former wander up and down, and crave a portion of the prey. Nor other shelter have they even for their babes, against the violence of tempests and ravening beasts, than to cover them with the branches of trees twisted together; this a reception for the old men, and hither resort the young. Such a condition they judge happier than the painful occupation of cultivating the ground, than the labour of rearing houses than the agitations of hope and fear attending the defense of their own property or the seizing that of others. Secure against the designs of men, secure against the malignity of the Gods, they have accomplished a thing of infinite difficulty; that to them nothing remains even to be wished.

This description is of a lifestyle different than that of the medieval Sámi, who were pastoralists living off herds of reindeer and inhabiting tents of deer hide. But the archaeological evidence suggests that the proto-Sámi and Proto-Finns had a lifestyle more akin to Tacitus' description.

== See also ==
- Finn (ethnonym)
- Finnic
- Sitones
- Finningia
