= Finningia =

Old Latin name for Finland

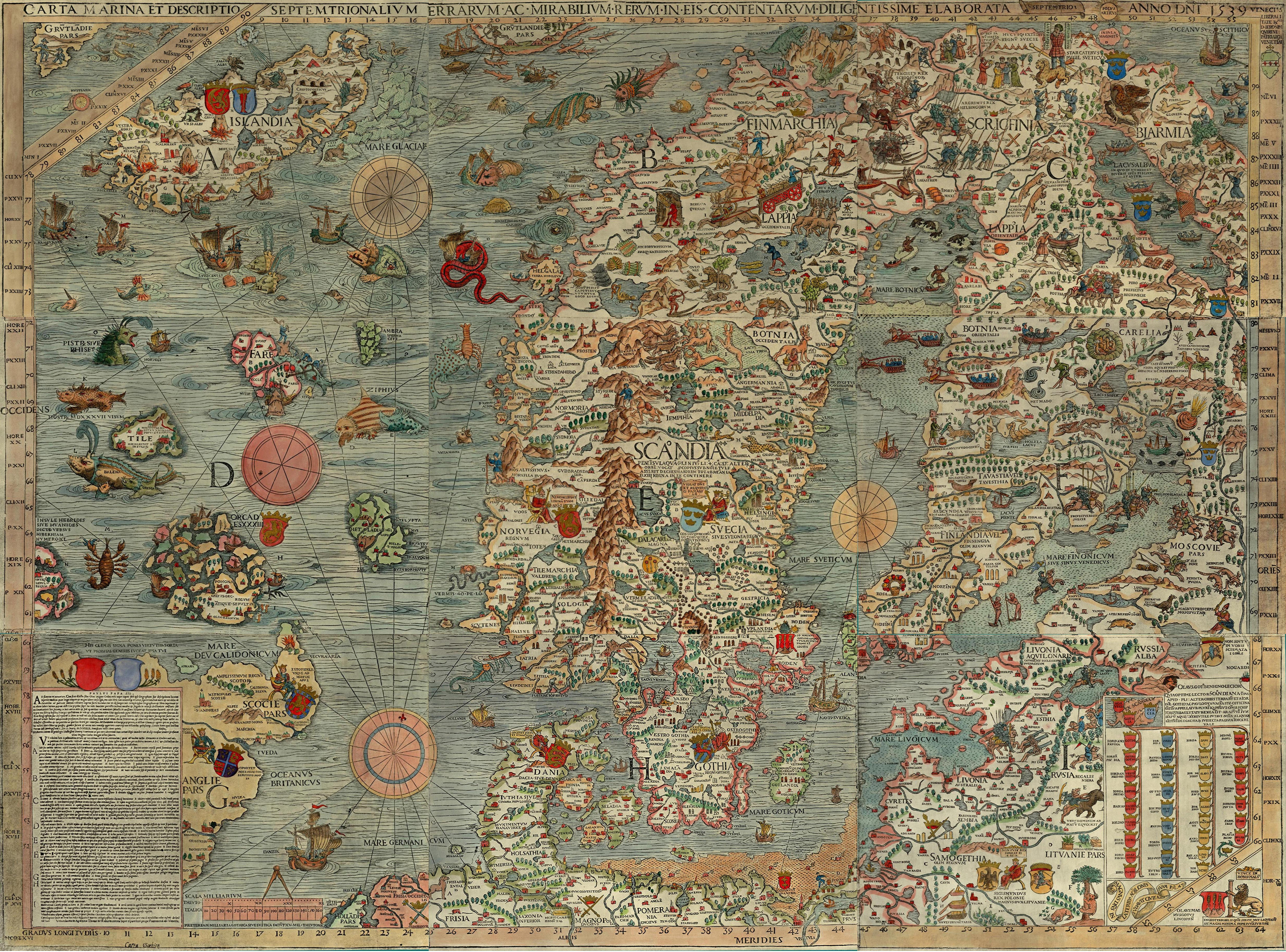
Carta marina, a 1539 map by the historian and cartographer Olaus Magnus

Finningia is one of the Latin names for Finland, along with Fennia, Finnia and Finlandia. The name first appeared in Carta marina, the Scandinavian map from 1539 created by the historian and cartographer Olaus Magnus. Olaus Magnus placed Finlandia vel Finningia olim regnum ("Finlandia or Finningia, an ancient kingdom") around Southwest Finland, suggesting an unhistorical past kingdom of Finland.

In Naturalis Historia ("Natural History"), Pliny the Elder mentions the island of Aeningia (with variant spellings such as Einingia and Eningia) as a "nearly equally large island" after Scatinavia. Johannes Magnus, the brother of Olaus Magnus, suggested in his Historia de omnibus Gothorum Sueonumque regibus (published posthumously in 1554) that this name should be read as Finningia.

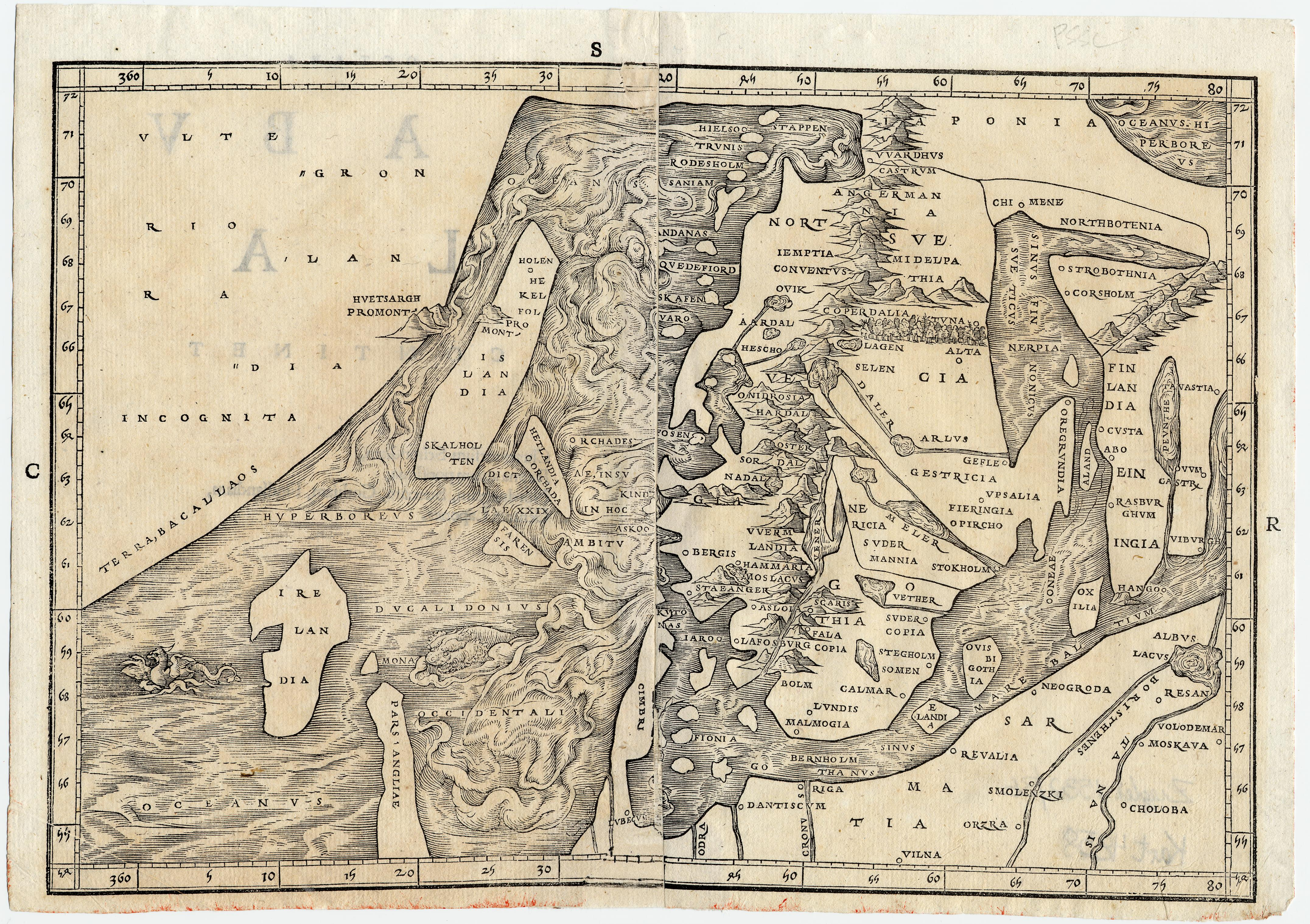
Map of Scandinavia (1532) by Jacob Ziegler

However, there is no agreement on what Pliny meant by Aeningia. The scholar and cartographer Jacob Ziegler placed Finlandia and Einingia next to each other in Southwest Finland in his map from 1532, and the French classical scholar Jean Hardouin believed that Aeningia referred to the area of modern Finland. Louis Poinsinet de Sivry and others have argued that it instead referred to the area of the present-day Baltic States. Valentin Parisot has suggested that Aeningia might refer to the island of Zealand, where there is a village by the name Hejninge.
