= Proto-Baltic language =

Ancestor of the Baltic languages

Proto-Baltic
- PB, PBl, Common Baltic
- Reconstruction of: Baltic languages
- Region: Central, Eastern and Northern Europe
- Era: 3rd m. BC – c. 5th century BC
- Reconstructed ancestors: Proto-Indo-European: Proto-Balto-Slavic

Proto-Baltic (PB, PBl, Common Baltic) is the unattested, reconstructed ancestral proto-language of all Baltic languages. It is not attested in writing, but has been partly reconstructed through the comparative method by gathering the collected data on attested Baltic and other Indo-European languages. It represents the common Baltic speech that approximately was spoken between the 3rd millennium BC and ca. 5th century BC, after which it began dividing into West and East Baltic languages. Proto-Baltic is thought to have been a fusional language and is associated with the Corded Ware and Trzciniec cultures.

Generally, Proto-Baltic had a SOV word order. Proto-Baltic is said to have possessed certain unique traits, such as turning short Proto-Indo-European vowels *o, *a into *a, retaining and further developing the Proto-Indo-European ablaut, retaining *m before dental consonants, the productivity of the word stem ē and free accentuation with two pitch accents. Also, the proto-language is thought to have had its own set of diminutive suffixes, identical endings for verb tenses and moods, past tense by applying thematic vowels *-ā- and *-ē-, as well as its own lexicon, including onomastic elements.

== Proto-Baltic area ==
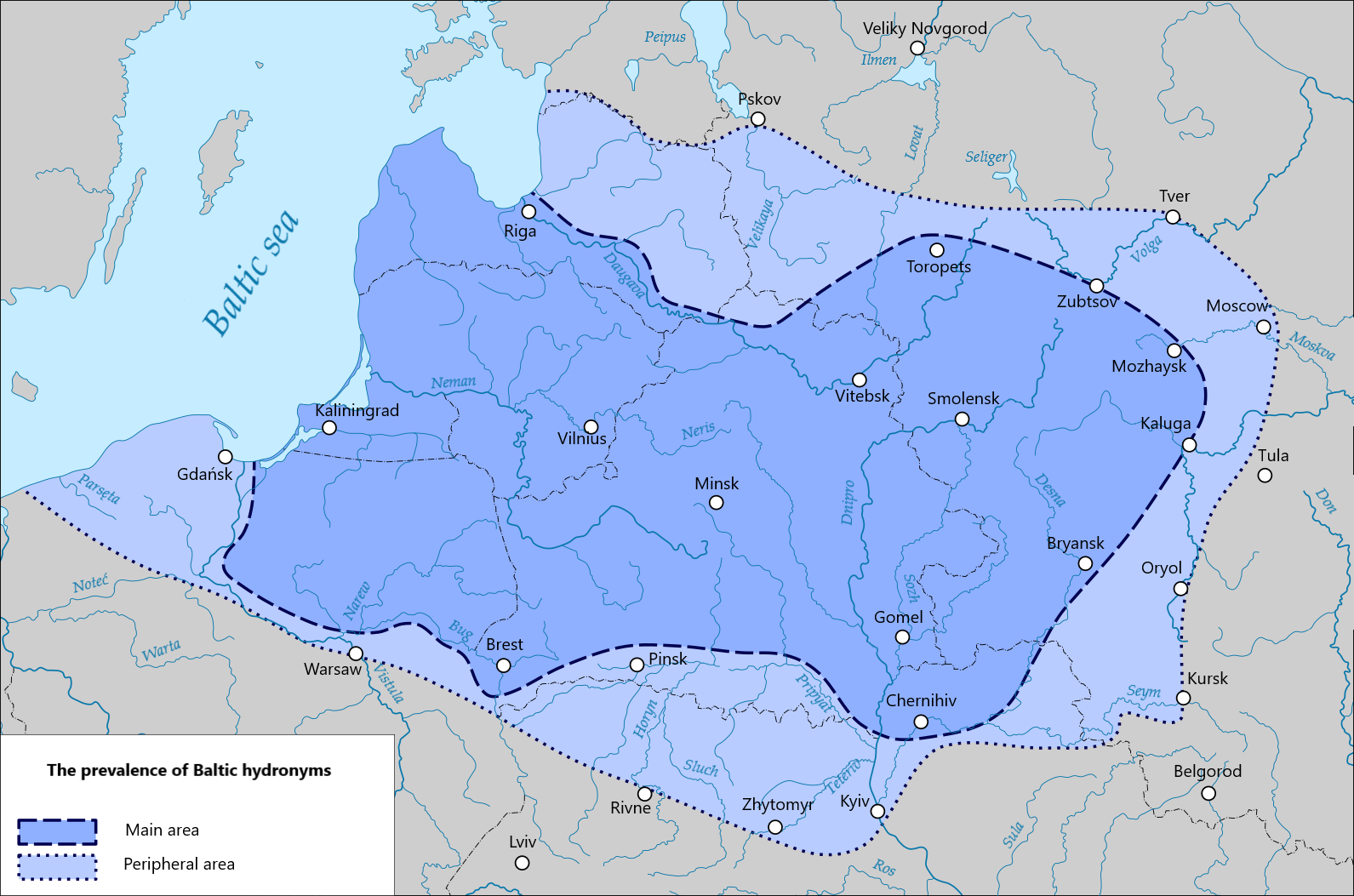
The prevalence of Baltic hydronyms Area with many Baltic hydronyms Area with few or questionable Baltic hydronyms

Baltic hydronyms cover a vast area of 860,000 km^{2} from Vystula River in the west to Moscow in the east and from the Baltic Sea in the north all the way to Kyiv in the south. The current Lithuanian and Latvian lands combined constitute approximately one-sixth of the former Baltic territory. Some researchers suggest that in the past Baltic lands from Vystula to Daugava were inhabited by Baltic Finnic tribes but they were assimilated by the Baltic newcomers later on. There is still an ongoing debate regarding the boundary of hydronyms in the southwest: Lithuanian linguist Simas Karaliūnas believed that practically all of the basins of Oder and Vystula Rivers belonged to the Baltic hydronym habitat while German linguist Hermann Schall suggested that Baltic hydronyms could be found much further west all the way to Elbe, Saxony and Rügen island. During the 2nd and 1st millennium BC, the Baltic people inhabited larger territories than Germanic and Slavic people did at the time. It is estimated that the Proto-Baltic lands had up to 500,000 people.

Inhabitants of the Proto-Baltic area were surrounded by Germanic people in the west, Slavs in the south and Finno-Ugric people in the north and northeast. Russian philologist Vladimir Toporov believes that during 1000–800 BC Proto-Germanic people began expanding into the western Baltic territory starting from the Pasłęka River. Later on, the Baltic area began shrinking even more due to the migration of the Goths. During the migration period Slavic people began expanding into the northern and eastern territories of the Balts. From 11th to 12th century, Russian scriptures mention ongoing battles near Moscow with Eastern Galindians. Since 1225, the conquests of the Teutonic Order in the current Baltic region intensified and later on resulted in the extinction of the Old Prussian speakers in the 18th century.

== Relationship with other language groups ==
Suggested early periods of linguistic convergence during the existence of the Proto-Baltic language.

=== Slavic languages ===
After a long-running debate in the 20th century about the exact nature of the relationship between the Baltic and Slavic branches of the Indo-European family, in the 21st century many historical linguists moved firmly in favour of a shared genealogical history between these two branches, both deriving from a common intermediate source, Proto-Balto-Slavic, after the breakup of Proto-Indo-European. Those in opposition continue to be sceptical about the nature of such a relationship and are uncertain whether it is even ascertainable. While Balto-Slavic has been traditionally divided into two main branches, viz. Baltic and Slavic, some linguists like Frederik Kortlandt or Rick Derksen proposed that Proto-Balto-Slavic split into three language groups — East Baltic, West Baltic and Proto-Slavic — without a Proto-Baltic stage, which is a view opposed by Miguel Villanueva Svensson and Eugen Hill. Historical linguist Brian D. Joseph argues that in the context of other Indo-European phylogenetic clades, the qualitative evidence for Balto-Slavic is not on par with Indo-Iranian, insofar as Balto-Slavic lacks evidence for shared culture (as is also the case for Italo-Celtic). Other scholars point out that the phonology and morphology, which is shared by all known Baltic languages, is much more archaic than that of Proto-Slavic, retaining many features attributed to other attested Indo-European languages roughly 3000 years ago.

Various schematic sketches of possible Balto-Slavic language relationships.

It is also known that some Baltic and Slavic languages have more in common than others: Old Prussian and Latvian share more commonalities with Slavic languages than Lithuanian does. Some similarities between Baltic and Slavic can be found on all levels of linguistic analysis, which led German philologist August Schleicher to believe that there was indeed a common point of development. French linguist Antoine Meillet, however, rejected this idea and claimed that similarities between Baltic and Slavic languages were a result of close contact. Meanwhile, Latvian linguist Jānis Endzelīns suggested that following the split of PIE, Baltic and Slavic languages evolved independently, but later experienced a common period of greater contact. Jan Michał Rozwadowski proposed that the two language groups were indeed a unity after the division of Indo-European, but also suggested that after the two had divided into separate entities (Baltic and Slavic), they had posterior contact. Russian linguists Vladimir Toporov and Vyacheslav Ivanov believed that Proto-Slavic language formed from the peripheral-type Baltic dialects. Thus, there are at least six points of view on the relationships between the Baltic and Slavic languages.

=== Germanic languages ===
There is some vocabulary (about 60 words) that Baltic and Germanic languages share, excluding loanwords. Common vocabulary mostly includes words relating to work, equipment, agriculture etc., such as Proto-Baltic *darbas, meaning 'work' and Proto-Germanic *derbaz, meaning 'bold, determined, strong' < *derbaną 'to work', Proto-Baltic *derṷā and Proto-Germanic *terwą, meaning 'tar, resin', Proto-Baltic *gāmurii̯as and Proto-Germanic *gōmô, meaning 'palate'. Baltic and Germanic languages also share numeral formation for 11 to 19, both partially possess the same formation of verbs in past tense (ablaut), absence of the aorist. According to German linguist Wolfgang P. Schmid, at first Proto-Baltic was a centum language along with Proto-Germanic, but it eventually became satem later on. Some scholars believe that Baltic and Germanic contacts are older than those with Slavic languages while others claim the opposite. According to Lithuanian linguist Saulius Ambrazas, Germanic people borrowed certain suffixes from their Baltic neighbours, such as *-ing-, *-isko-, *-ō-men- (e.g. Old High German: arming 'poor person', Old Icelandic: bernska 'childhood', Gothic: aldōmin (dat) 'senility'). Both Baltic and Germanic emotional verbs possess similar semantic development, which is evinced by roots like *dhers- and *dreǵh-. This semantic group is also noted for having exclusive isoglosses (e.g. PIE: *dreǵh-, *dherbh-, *u̯rengh-, *peḱ-), though they differ in meaning.

Simas Karaliūnas suggested that in the 3rd millennium BC Germanic and Baltic languages shared a common phase of linguistic convergence and that Baltic dialects were initially closer to the Germanic dialects than Slavic ones. He noted that although Germanic languages possess more lexical commonalities with Slavic languages, Baltic and Germanic groups share a greater number of grammatical innovations. This is evinced by the possession of *-mo- (e.g. Lithuanian: pirmas, Gothic: fruma, Old English: forma), second consanguineous component (cf. Lithuanian: vie-nuo-lika, dvy-lika, Gothic: ain-lif, twa-lif, Old High German: ein-lif, zwei-lif), identical dual number pronouns in first and second person (cf. Lithuanian: vedu, Gothic: wit < *we-dwō- ‘we two’; Lithuanian: judu, Gothic: jut < *yu-dwō- ‘you two’), common grammatical constructions to describe natural phenomenons (cf. Lithuanian: sniegas drimba, Latvian: sniegs drēbj, Old Icelandic: drift snær ‘snow is falling down’) and resemblance of comparative degree prefixe -esnis to its corresponding Germanic counterpart (cf. Gothic: -izan).

=== Finnic languages ===
The linguistic influences of Baltic Finnic languages, which are associated with the eastern Baltic area, can be observed in certain grammatical innovations, such as the merger of some cases with postpositions, thus forming new additional cases (postpositional locatives): inessive *šakāi + en > *šakāi̯en 'in the branch', illative *šakān + nā > *šakānā 'into the branch', adessive *šakāi + prei > *šakāip(r)ei '(to be) by the branch' and allative *šakās + prei > *šakāsp(r)ei '(get closer) to the branch'. The impact of the Finnic languages over Baltic languages also explains the widespread use of a non-agreed modifier expressed by the genitive of a noun (Latvian: latviešu valoda, literally 'language of the Latvians') in contrast to other Indo-European languages that usually apply an agreed modifier expressed by an adjective (German: die lettische Sprache 'Latvian language') as well as the usage of indirect mood when one is retelling an event without knowing whether it actually happened.

In turn, Baltic Finnic languages have many borrowings from the Baltic languages. Baltic languages accelerated diphthongization in these languages, the impact of the Baltic languages explains compound forms of the past tense (Estonian: olen lugenud 'I have read', Estonian: olin lugenud 'I had read' cf. Lithuanian: esu skaitęs, buvau skaitęs), development of the agreed modifier not found in other Uralic languages (Estonian: suur linn 'big city' (nom), Estonian: suure linna 'of the big city' (GEN), Estonian: suurele linnale 'towards the big city; for the big city' (all) cf. Lithuanian: didelis miestas, didelio miesto, dideliam miestui), fortifying suffix -pa / -pä (Finnish: jopa 'even, as much as', Finnish: vieläpä '(but) also, (but) even', Finnish: jospa 'maybe, if' cf. Lithuanian: bei 'and, as well as', Prussian: bhe 'and') etc.

== Phonetics and phonology ==
=== Vowels and diphthongs ===
The vowels of Proto-Baltic changed little in comparison to PIE: short vowels *a and *o coincided into a single *a while the reduced Indo-European vowel schwa primum (*ə) also turned into *a as it did in other Indo-European languages of Europe and it ceased to exist in the middle of words. According to the proponents of the Laryngeal theory, the schwa primum appeared by turning laryngeals into vowels, which makes its reconstruction for PIE unnecessary and obsolete. There were four short and five long vowels as well as four short and six long diphthongs as presented below:

Vowels
Type	Front		Back	
Type	long	short	long	short
Close	ī	i	ū	u
Mid	ē	e	ō	
Open			ā	a

Diphthongs
Type	Front		Back	
Type	long	short	long	short
Close				
Mid	ēi, ēu	ei, eu	ōi, ōu	
Open			āi, āu	ai, au

Vowels *a, *e, *i, *u together with sonorants *r, *l, *m, *n of Proto-Baltic were used to form mixed diphthongs as they are being used in the modern Baltic languages today. It is also well known that there were mixed diphthongs with long vowels at the endings. Long diphthongs can be reconstructed when glottaling (e.g. PIE: *pl̥h₁nós 'full' > Proto-Balto-Slavic: *pī́ˀlnas 'full'), compared to PIE, the position of stress in the example is conditioned by Hirt's law. Long mixed diphthongs, which position in the morpheme is hardly determined or their existence is questionable are presented in Italic:

Mixed diphthongs
		Sonorants			
		-r	-l	-m	-n
Vowels	a- ā-	ar ār	al āl	am ām	an ān
Vowels	e- ē-	er ēr	el ēl	em ēm	en ēn
Vowels	i- ī-	ir īr	il īl	im īm	in īn
Vowels	u- ū-	ur ūr	ul ūl	um ūm	un ūn
Vowels	ō-	ōr	ōl	ōm	ōn

=== Consonants ===
The consonants of Proto-Baltic experienced greater changes than primary vowels when in their primordial condition. PIE aspirated and labialized velar consonants (*bʰ, *dʰ, *gʰ, *g^{u̯}, *g^{u̯}ʰ, *k^{u̯}) in Proto-Baltic coincided with plain consonants (*b, *d, *g, *k) as they did in some other Indo-European languages. However, at the early stages of development, the differences between plain and aspirated voiced plosives might have been retained. This is because before the plain voiced plosives the vowels were lengthened, which is not the case with the aspirated voiced ones (Winter's law). Proto-Baltic was a satem language, PIE *ḱ turned into *ś (later merged into *š), PIE *ǵ and PIE *ǵʰ turned into *ž. Proto-Baltic was also affected by the Ruki sound law, with *s turning into *š after *r, *u̯, a velar consonant, and *i̯.

		Bilabial	Dental/Alveolar	Post-Alveolar	Palatal	Velar
Plosive	voiceless	p	t			k
Plosive	voiced	b	d			ɡ
Nasal		m	n			
Fricative	voiceless		s	ʃ		
Fricative	voiced		z	ʒ		
Trill			r			
Lateral Approximant			l			
Approximant		(u̯)			i̯	(u̯)

The sonorants of PIE *ṛ, *ḷ, *ṃ, *ṇ, which were used as vowels and could form a syllable, turned into mixed diphthongs *ir, *il, *im, *in (in rarer cases—*ur, *ul, *um, *un) in Proto-Baltic. These diphthongs alternated (had an ablaut) with *er (*ēr), *el (*ēl), *em (*ēm), *en (*ēn) and *ar (*ōr), *al (*ōl), *am (*ōm), *an (*ōn).

One of the unique properties of Baltic languages is the disappearance of the semivowel *i̯ between a consonant and a front vowel (e.g. *žemi̯ē > *žemē 'earth').

Another noteworthy trait of Proto-Baltic is the retained intact *m existing before front dental consonants *t, *d, *s (e.g. *šimtan 'hundred', *kimdai 'gloves', *tamsā 'darkness'), which in other Indo-European languages turned into n. However, unlike in Italic or Indo-Iranian languages, in Proto-Baltic *m and *ṃ would become *n at the very end of a word.

=== Stress and pitch accent ===
In the Proto-Baltic language, the stress could be placed on any syllable, the stress was free, unfixed. According to the movement of stress, three possible variants of accent system are reconstructed: 1) a system with baritone accentuation (stress on the stem) and oxytonic accentuation (stress on the endings), 2) a system with baritone accentuation and mobile accentuation (stress moves from endings to the stem), 3) a system with the baritone, mobile and oxytonic accentuations.

There were two pitch accents, an acute (´) and a circumflex (˜), which were pronounced with pure and mixed diphthongs and long vowels. Pitch accents could be pronounced both in the stems and in the endings. The acute pitch had a rising intonation, while the circumflex pitch had a falling intonation. Some scientists (Zigmas Zinkevičius, Vytautas Kardelis, Vytautas Rinkevičius (1981) etc.) believe that pitch accents were pronounced both in stressed and unstressed syllables, for example *'rãnkā́ 'hand' (stress placed on the first syllable, although both syllables had different pitch accents).

== Morphology ==
=== Nouns ===
The noun of Proto-Baltic possessed very archaic traits—the endings were not being shortened and were close to the endings of PIE. It had three grammatical categories: gender (masculine, feminine and neuter), number (singular, dual and plural) and seven cases: nominative, genitive, dative, accusative, instrumental, locative and vocative with three different dual case forms. In comparison to the PIE reconstruction, Proto-Baltic only failed to retain the ablative and allative cases. Neuter gender was only retained by Old Prussian while in Latvian and Lithuanian it ceased to exist. That said, other neuter forms of inflected words such as adjectives, participles, pronouns and numerals remained in Lithuanian.

*ā-stem and *ē-stem nouns were feminine, *o-stem nouns basically were masculine and neuter, *s-stem nouns were neuter, *r-stem nouns―masculine and feminine while other noun stems could refer to all three genders. Unlike feminine and masculine nouns, neuter ones always had the same form for the nominative, accusative, and vocative cases. This form distinguished neuter nouns from masculine and feminine ones belonging to the same stem. Masculine and feminine nouns of the same stem had identical endings, and the grammatical gender was indicated by gender-changing words (pronouns, adjectives, participles, etc.) used with nouns: *labas anglis 'a good coal' (masculine), *labā au̯is 'a good sheep' (feminine), *laba(n) mari 'a good sea' (neuter). Because of the disappearance of the semivowel *i̯ between a consonant and a front vowel, neuter *i-stem words had changes *mari̯ī > *marī 'two seas', *aru̯i̯ī > *aru̯ī 'two suitable ones' in dual.

==== *o-stem nouns ====
- *deiṷas 'God' < PBS *deiwás < PIE *deywós (> Pruss. dēiwas, pre-Lith. *dēvas and Lith. dievas, Ltv. dievs)
- *buta(n) 'house' < PBS *bū́ˀtei? ("to be") (> Lith. butà, rare synonym of bùtas and namas; Pruss. buttan [= butan])

Case	Singular		Dual		Plural	
Case	Masculine	Neuter	Masculine	Neuter	Masculine	Neuter
Nominative	*deiṷas	*buta(n)	*deiṷō	*butai	*deiṷai	*butā
Genitive	*deiṷas(a) / *deiṷā	*butas(a) / *butā	*deiṷōus	*butōus	*deiṷōn	*butōn
Dative	*deiṷōi	*butōi	*deiṷamā	*butamā	*deiṷamas	*butamas
Accusative	*deiṷan	*buta(n)	*deiṷō	*butai	*deiṷōns	*butā
Instrumental	*deiṷō	*butō	*deiṷamā	*butamā	*deiṷais	*butais
Locative	*deiṷei	*butei	*deiṷōus	*butōus	*deiṷeisu	*buteisu
Vocative	*deiṷe!	*buta(n)!	*deiṷō!	*butai!	*deiṷai!	*butā!

==== *ā-stem nouns ====
*rankā 'hand' < PBS *ránkāˀ < PIE *wrónkeh₂ (> Lith. rankà, Ltv. ròka, Pruss. ranko [written as "rancko"]; cognate with the Lith. verb riñkti)

Case	Singular	Dual	Plural
Case	Feminine		
Nominative	*rankā	*rankāi	*rankās
Genitive	*rankās	*rankāus	*rankōn
Dative	*rankāi	*rankāmā	*rankāmas
Accusative	*rankān	*rankāi	*rankāns
Instrumental	*rankān	*rankāmā	*rankāmīs
Locative	*rankāi	*rankāus	*rankāsu
Vocative	*ranka!	*rankāi!	*rankās!

==== *ē-stem nouns ====
*žemē 'earth' < PBS *źémē < pre-BS *ǵʰem-m̥ (> Lith. žẽmė, Ltv. zeme, Pruss. zemē [written as "semme"])

Case	Singular	Dual	Plural
Case	Feminine		
Nominative	*žemē	*žemēi	*žemēs
Genitive	*žemēs	*žemēus	*žemi̯ōn
Dative	*žemēi	*žemēmā	*žemēmas
Accusative	*žemēn	*žemēi	*žemēns
Instrumental	*žemēn	*žemēmā	*žemēmīs
Locative	*žemēi	*žemēus	*žemēsu
Vocative	*žeme!	*žemēi!	*žemēs!

==== *i-stem nouns ====
- *anglis 'coal, charcoal' < PBS *anˀglís < PIE *h₁óngʷl̥ (> Lith. anglìs, Pruss. anglis, dialectal Ltv. oglis)
- *au̯is 'sheep' < PBS *áwis < PIE *h₂ówis (> Lith. avis, Ltv. avs)
- *mari 'sea' < PBS *mári < PIE *móri (> Old Lith. mãrės)

Case	Singular			Dual			Plural		
Case	Masculine	Feminine	Neuter	Masculine	Feminine	Neuter	Masculine	Feminine	Neuter
Nominative	*anglis	*au̯is	*mari	*anglī	*au̯ī	*marī	*angleis / *anglii̯es	*au̯eis / *au̯ii̯es	*marī
Genitive	*angleis	*au̯eis	*mareis	*anglii̯aus	*au̯ii̯aus	*marii̯aus	*angli̯ōn	*au̯i̯ōn	*mari̯ōn
Dative	*anglei	*au̯ei	*marei	*anglimā	*au̯imā	*marimā	*anglimas	*au̯imas	*marimas
Accusative	*anglin	*au̯in	*mari	*anglī	*au̯ī	*marī	*anglins	*au̯ins	*marī
Instrumental	*anglimi	*au̯imi	*marimi	*anglimā	*au̯imā	*marimā	*anglimīs	*au̯imīs	*marimīs
Locative	*anglēi	*au̯ēi	*marēi	*anglii̯aus	*au̯ii̯aus	*marii̯aus	*anglisu	*au̯isu	*marisu
Vocative	*anglei!	*au̯ei!	*mari!	*anglī!	*au̯ī!	*marī!	*angleis! / *anglii̯es!	*au̯eis! / *au̯ii̯es!	*marī!

==== *u-stem nouns ====
- *sūnus 'son' < PBS *sū́ˀnus < PIE *suHnús (> Old. Lith. súnus, Ltv. soūns)
- *girnus 'millstone' < PBS *gírˀnūˀ < PIE *gʷr̥h₂núHs (> Lith. girna, Ltv. dzir̃nus and dzir̃navas, Pruss. girnoywis [wrong transcription of *girnuvis])
- *medu 'honey' < PBS *médu < PIE *médʰu (> Lith. medùs, Ltv. medus, Pruss. meddo)

Case	Singular			Dual			Plural		
Case	Masculine	Feminine	Neuter	Masculine	Feminine	Neuter	Masculine	Feminine	Neuter
Nominative	*sūnus	*girnus	*medu	*sūnū	*girnū	*medu̯ī	*sūnaus / *sūnaṷes	*girnaus / *girnaṷes	*medū
Genitive	*sūnaus	*girnaus	*medaus	*sūnau̯aus	*girnau̯aus	*medau̯aus	*sūnṷōn	*girnṷōn	*medṷōn
Dative	*sūnōi / *sūnau̯ei	*girnōi / *girnau̯ei	*medōi / medau̯ei	*sūnumā	*girnumā	*medumā	*sūnumas	*girnumas	*medumas
Accusative	*sūnun	*girnun	*medu	*sūnū	*girnū	*medu̯ī	*sūnuns	*girnuns	*medū
Instrumental	*sūnumi	*girnumi	*medumi	*sūnumā	*girnumā	*medumā	*sūnumīs	*girnumīs	*medumīs
Locative	*sūnōu	*girnōu	*medōu	*sūnau̯aus	*girnau̯aus	*medau̯aus	*sūnusu	*girnusu	*medusu
Vocative	*sūnau!	*girnau!	*medu!	*sūnū!	*girnū!	*medu̯ī!	*sūnaus! / *sūnaṷes!	*girnaus! / *girnaṷes!	*medū!

==== *r-stem nouns ====
- *brātē 'brother' < PBS *brā́ˀtē < PIE *bʰréh₂tēr (> dialectal Lith. broti, Pruss. brāti, Ltv. brālis from a diminutive form)
- *duktē 'daughter' < PBS *duktḗ < pre-BS *dʰuktḗr < PIE *dʰugh₂tḗr (> Old Lith. duktė́, Pruss. dukti [written as "duckti"])

Case	Singular		Dual		Plural	
Case	Masculine	Feminine	Masculine	Feminine	Masculine	Feminine
Nominative	*brātē	*duktē	*brātere	*duktere	*brāteres	*dukteres
Genitive	*brāteres	*dukteres	*brāteraus	*dukteraus	*brāterōn	*dukterōn
Dative	*brāterei	*dukterei	*brātermā	*duktermā	*brātermas	*duktermas
Accusative	*brāterin	*dukterin	*brātere	*duktere	*brāterins	*dukterins
Instrumental	*brātermi	*duktermi	*brātermā	*duktermā	*brātermīs	*duktermīs
Locative	*brāteri	*dukteri	*brāteraus	*dukteraus	*brātersu	*duktersu
Vocative	*brāter!	*dukter!	*brātere!	*duktere!	*brāteres!	*dukteres!

==== *n-stem nouns ====
- *akmō 'stone' < PBS *ákmō < PIE *h₂éḱmō (> Old. Lith. ãkmuo, Ltv. akmens)
- *sēmen 'seed' < PBS *sḗˀmen < PIE *séh₁mn̥ (> Lith. sėmuõ, Pruss. semen)

Case	Singular		Dual		Plural	
Case	Masculine	Neuter	Masculine	Neuter	Masculine	Neuter
Nominative	*akmō	*sēmen	*akmene	*sēmenī	*akmenes	*sēmenā
Genitive	*akmenes	*sēmenes	*akmenaus	*sēmenaus	*akmenōn	*sēmenōn
Dative	*akmenei	*sēmenei	*akmenmā	*sēmenmā	*akmenmas	*sēmenmas
Accusative	*akmenin	*sēmen	*akmene	*sēmenī	*akmenins	*sēmenā
Instrumental	*akmenmi	*sēmenmi	*akmenmā	*sēmenmā	*akmenmīs	*sēmenmīs
Locative	*akmeni	*sēmeni	*akmenaus	*sēmenaus	*akmensu	*sēmensu
Vocative	*akmen!	*sēmen!	*akmene!	*sēmenī!	*akmenes!	*sēmenā!

==== *l-stem nouns ====
*ābō 'apple-tree' < PBS *ā́ˀbōl [apple] < PIE *h₂ébōl (> Lith. obelis, Ltv. ābele, Pruss. wobalne)

Case	Singular	Dual	Plural
Case	Feminine		
Nominative	*ābō	*ābele	*ābeles
Genitive	*ābeles	*ābelaus	*ābelōn
Dative	*ābelei	*ābelmā	*ābelmas
Accusative	*ābelin	*ābele	*ābelins
Instrumental	*ābelmi	*ābelmā	*ābelmīs
Locative	*ābeli	*ābelaus	*ābelsu
Vocative	*ābel!	*ābele!	*ābeles!

==== *s-stem nouns ====
*nebas 'cloud' < PBS *néba < PIE *nébʰos (> Old Lith. dẽbesis [f.], Ltv. debess [f.])

Case	Singular	Dual	Plural
Case	Neuter		
Nominative	*nebas	*nebesī	*nebesā
Genitive	*nebeses	*nebesaus	*nebesōn
Dative	*nebesei	*nebesmā	*nebesmas
Accusative	*nebas	*nebesī	*nebesā
Instrumental	*nebesmi	*nebesmā	*nebesmīs
Locative	*nebesi	*nebesaus	*nebe(s)su
Vocative	*nebas!	*nebesī!	*nebesā!

==== Root nouns ====
- *ṷaišpats 'lord' (> Lith. viẽšpats or viēšpats; cognate with ancient Greek οῖκος [oikos] "settlement" < ϝοῖκος [woikos] < PE *wóikos < PIE *wóyḱos, while the ending could come from PIE *pótis, "ruler")
- *šēr 'heart' < PBS *śḗr < PIE *ḱḗr (> Old Lith. širdès, Ltv. sir̂ds)

Case	Singular		Dual		Plural	
Case	Masculine	Neuter	Masculine	Neuter	Masculine	Neuter
Nominative	*ṷaišpats	*šēr	*ṷaišpate	*šerdī	*ṷaišpates	*šerdā
Genitive	*ṷaišpates	*širdes	*ṷaišpataus	*širdaus	*ṷaišpatōn	*širdōn
Dative	*ṷaišpatei	*širdei	*ṷaišpatmā	*širdmā	*ṷaišpatmas	*širdmas
Accusative	*ṷaišpatin	*šēr	*ṷaišpate	*šerdī	*ṷaišpatins	*šerdā
Instrumental	*ṷaišpatmi	*širdmi	*ṷaišpatmā	*širdmā	*ṷaišpatmīs	*širdmīs
Locative	*ṷaišpati	*širdi	*ṷaišpataus	*širdaus	*ṷaišpatsu	*širdsu
Vocative	*ṷaišpat!	*šēr!	*ṷaišpate!	*šerdī!	*ṷaišpates!	*šerdā!

=== Adjectives ===
Unlike the noun, the adjective used to be alternated using a gender (masculine, feminine, and neuter), which was then adapted to the corresponding gender of the noun. Adjectives had three degrees: positive (no suffix: masculine *labas, neuter *laban, feminine *labā 'good'), comparative (suffix *-es-: masculine *labesis, neuter *labesi, feminine *labesē 'better') and superlative (suffix *-im-: masculine *labimas, neuter *labiman, feminine *labimā 'the best'). They had singular, dual and plural numbers as they were applied to adjectives for combining them with nouns. The vocative case usually concurred with the nominative one.

As in the case of noun paradigms, there were *i̯o- (fem. *i̯ā-) and *ii̯o- (fem. *ē-) stem variants next to the *o-stem adjectives. Feminine gender forms were constructed with the *ā-stem while the feminine forms with the *i̯ā-stem (sing. nom. *-ī) were constructed with the *u-stem adjectives. The feminine gender of the masculine and neuter genders for the *i-stem probably resulted with *i̯ā- or *ē-stems. However, the reconstruction of the later is difficult as the *i-stem adjectives in the current Baltic languages were poorly preserved.

==== *o-stem, *ā-stem adjectives ====
*labas 'good' < PBS *labas < perhaps PIE *labʰos (> Lith. lãbas, Latv. labs, Prus. labs)

Case	Singular			Dual			Plural		
Case	Masculine	Neuter	Feminine	Masculine	Neuter	Feminine	Masculine	Neuter	Feminine
Nominative Vocative	*labas	*laban / *laba	*labā	*labō	*labai	*labāi	*labai	*labā	*labās
Genitive	*labas(a) / *labā		*labās	*labōus		*labāus	*labōn		
Dative	*labōi		*labāi	*labamā		*labāmā	*labamas		*labāmas
Accusative	*laban	*laban / *laba	*labān	*labō	*labai	*labāi	*labōns	*labā	*labāns
Instrumental	*labō		*labān	*labamā		*labāmā	*labais		*labāmīs
Locative	*labei		*labāi	*labōus		*labāus	*labeisu		*labāsu

==== *u-stem, *i̯ā-stem adjectives ====
*platus 'wide' < PBS *platús < PIE *pléth₂us (> Lith. platus, Latv. plats, Prus. plat-)

Case	Singular			Dual			Plural		
Case	Masculine	Neuter	Feminine	Masculine	Neuter	Feminine	Masculine	Neuter	Feminine
Nominative Vocative	*platus	*platu	*platī	*platū	*platu̯ī	*plati̯āi	*plataus / *platau̯es	*platū	*plati̯ās
Genitive	*plataus		*plati̯ās	*platau̯aus		*plati̯āus	*platu̯ōn		*plati̯ōn
Dative	*platōi / *platau̯ei		*plati̯āi	*platumā		*plati̯āmā	*platumas		*plati̯āmas
Accusative	*platun	*platu	*plati̯ān	*platū	*platu̯ī	*plati̯āi	*platuns	*platū	*plati̯āns
Instrumental	*platumi		*plati̯ān	*platumā		*plati̯āmā	*platumīs		*plati̯āmīs
Locative	*platōu		*plati̯āi	*platau̯aus		*plati̯āus	*platusu		*plati̯āsu

==== *i-stem, *ē-stem adjectives ====
*aru̯is 'suitable' < PBS *arwis (> Lith. arvis or arvas, then displaced by tinkamas, linked to the verb tikti; Prus. arwis "true, correct", and PS *orvьnъ "straight, even" > Rus. ровный)

Case	Singular			Dual			Plural		
Case	Masculine	Neuter	Feminine	Masculine	Neuter	Feminine	Masculine	Neuter	Feminine
Nominative Vocative	*aru̯is	*aru̯i	*aru̯ē	*aru̯ī		*aru̯ēi	*aru̯eis / *aru̯ii̯es	*aru̯ī	*aru̯ēs
Genitive	*aru̯eis		*aru̯ēs	*aru̯ii̯aus		*aru̯ēus	*aru̯i̯ōn		
Dative	*aru̯ei		*aru̯ēi	*aru̯imā		*aru̯ēmā	*aru̯imas		*aru̯ēmas
Accusative	*aru̯in	*aru̯i	*aru̯ēn	*aru̯ī		*aru̯ēi	*aru̯ins	*aru̯ī	*aru̯ēns
Instrumental	*aru̯imi		*aru̯ēn	*aru̯imā		*aru̯ēmā	*aru̯imīs		*aru̯ēmīs
Locative	*aru̯ēi		*aru̯ēi	*aru̯ii̯aus		*aru̯ēus	*aru̯isu		*aru̯ēsu

=== Verbs ===
The reconstruction of the verb of Proto-Baltic is mostly based on the collected data on the East Baltic languages, as the verb system in Old Prussian is poorly attested. The reconstructed verb system is attributed to the later stages of linguistic development. Unlike other parts of speech, the verb of Proto-Baltic experienced a lot of changes—the grammatical mood, tense and voice systems that came from PIE changed. For instance, from the former Proto-Indo-European tenses—the present, the aorist, the perfect—only the present was preserved by Proto-Baltic in addition to the sigmatic future, which by some researchers is considered to be an inheritance from late PIE.

In PIE there were four moods: indicative, subjunctive, optative and imperative. In Proto-Baltic, indicative remained but subjunctive was changed by the newly formed conditional mood. Meanwhile, imperative gained forms from optative. PIE also had two verb voices – active and middle. The latter was changed with reflexive verbs in Proto-Baltic. New types of verb form (the analytical perfect and the pluperfect) and the analytical passive voice were created. The most archaic trait of Proto-Baltic is the retained athematic conjugation. In the first and second person forms, Proto-Baltic had preserved the three numbers from PIE (singular, dual and plural), while in third person, number was not distinguished.

The verb of Proto-Baltic had three basic stems, i.e. the stems of the present tense, past tense and the infinitive. All forms of the verb were based on those stems. For example, the stems of the verb 'to carry' were *neša-, *nešē-, *neš-; the stems of the verb 'to sit' were *sēdi-, *sēdējā-, *sēdē-. Compared to Lith. nẽša 'he carries', nẽšė 'he carried', nèšti 'to carry'; sė́di 'he sits', sėdė́jo 'he sat', sėdė́ti 'to sit'.

==== Conjugation ====
CH. Stang identifies the following conjugations of verbs in the present tense: athematic, thematic (*o-stem verbs) and semi-thematic (*i-stem and *ā-stem verbs). The future tense was formed using the *-s- / -*si- suffix attached to the infinitive stem, and because of the *-si- suffix, all future tense verbs were conjugated with the *i-stem. The past tense had *ā- and *ē-stems. With a few exceptions (1st sg. conditional *rinkti̯ā 'I would gather'; 3rd imperative, the same in all numbers; 2nd sg. imperative), all verb endings were borrowed from the present tense.

The third person singular and plural of "to be" had two versions. The second version *irā, which is in turn inherited from Proto-Balto-Slavic *irā, is an innovation from an unclear source. Its modern reflexes include Lithuanian "yrà" and Latvian "ir"; both mean "(he) is".

Present
		Athematic verbs	*o-stem verbs	*i-stem verbs	*ā-stem verbs
		*būtei 'be' (Lith. būti, Prus. boūt, Latv. būt)	*rinktei 'gather, collect' (Lith. rinkti, rankioti, Prus. sen-rīnka '(he) collects', cf. Latv. roka 'a hand')	*turētei 'have' (Lith. turėti, Prus. turrītwei, Latv. turēt 'hold' )	*laikītei 'hold' (Lith. laikyti, Prus. laikūt, Latv. dial. laicīt 'save' )
Singular	1st sg.	*esmi	*renkō	*turi̯ō	*laikāu
Singular	2nd sg.	*esēi	*renkēi	*turēi	*laikāi
Singular	3rd sg.	*esti; *irā	*renka	*turi	*laikā
Dual	1st du.	*esu̯ā	*renkau̯ā	*turiu̯ā	*laikāu̯ā
Dual	2nd du.	*estā	*renkatā	*turitā	*laikātā
Dual	3rd du.	*esti	*renka	*turi	*laikā
Plural	1st pl.	*esmē	*renkamē	*turimē	*laikāmē
Plural	2nd pl.	*estē	*renkatē	*turitē	*laikātē
Plural	3rd pl.	*esti; *irā	*renka	*turi	*laikā

Future
		*i-stem verbs (all the verbs)			
		*būtei 'be'	*rinktei 'gather, collect'	*turētei 'have'	*laikītei 'hold'
Singular	1st sg.	*būsi̯ō	*rinksi̯ō	*turēsi̯ō	*laikīsi̯ō
Singular	2nd sg.	*būsēi	*rinksēi	*turēsēi	*laikīsēi
Singular	3rd sg.	*būs	*rinks	*turēs	*laikīs
Dual	1st du.	*būsiu̯ā	*rinksiu̯ā	*turēsiu̯ā	*laikīsiu̯ā
Dual	2nd du.	*būsitā	*rinksitā	*turēsitā	*laikīsitā
Dual	3rd du.	*būs	*rinks	*turēs	*laikīs
Plural	1st pl.	*būsimē	*rinksimē	*turēsimē	*laikīsimē
Plural	2nd pl.	*būsitē	*rinksitē	*turēsitē	*laikīsitē
Plural	3rd pl.	*būs	*rinks	*turēs	*laikīs

Past
		*ā-stem verbs			*ē-stem verbs
		*būtei 'be'	*rinktei 'gather, collect'	*turētei 'have'	*laikītei 'hold'
Singular	1st sg.	*bii̯āu	*rinkāu	*turēi̯āu	*laikēu
Singular	2nd sg.	*bii̯āi	*rinkāi	*turēi̯āi	*laikēi
Singular	3rd sg.	*bii̯ā	*rinkā	*turēi̯ā	*laikē
Dual	1st du.	*bii̯āu̯ā	*rinkāu̯ā	*turēi̯āu̯ā	*laikēu̯ā
Dual	2nd du.	*bii̯ātā	*rinkātā	*turēi̯ātā	*laikētā
Dual	3rd du.	*bii̯ā	*rinkā	*turēi̯ā	*laikē
Plural	1st pl.	*bii̯āmē	*rinkāmē	*turēi̯āmē	*laikēmē
Plural	2nd pl.	*bii̯ātē	*rinkātē	*turēi̯ātē	*laikētē
Plural	3rd pl.	*bii̯ā	*rinkā	*turēi̯ā	*laikē

Conditional
		*i-stem verbs (all the verbs)			
		*būtei 'be'	*rinktei 'gather, collect'	*turētei 'have'	*laikītei 'hold'
Singular	1st sg.	*būti̯ā / *būtunbi̯ō	*rinkti̯ā / *rinktunbi̯ō	*turēti̯ā / *turētunbi̯ō	*laikīti̯ā / *laikītunbi̯ō
Singular	2nd sg.	*būtunbēi	*rinktunbēi	*turētunbēi	*laikītunbēi
Singular	3rd sg.	*būtun(bi)	*rinktun(bi)	*turētun(bi)	*laikītun(bi)
Dual	1st du	*būtunbiu̯ā	*rinktunbiu̯ā	*turētunbiu̯ā	*laikītunbiu̯ā
Dual	2nd du.	*būtunbitā	*rinktunbitā	*turētunbitā	*laikītunbitā
Dual	3rd du.	*būtun(bi)	*rinktun(bi)	*turētun(bi)	*laikītun(bi)
Plural	1st pl.	*būtunbimē	*rinktunbimē	*turētunbimē	*laikītunbimē
Plural	2nd pl.	*būtunbitē	*rinktunbitē	*turētunbitē	*laikītunbitē
Plural	3rd pl.	*būtun(bi)	*rinktun(bi)	*turētun(bi)	*laikītun(bi)

Imperative
		Athematic verbs	*o-stem verbs	*i-stem verbs	*ā-stem verbs
		*būtei 'be'	*rinktei 'gather, collect'	*turētei 'have'	*laikītei 'hold'
Singular	2nd sg.	*esis	*renkais	*turīs	*laikāis
Singular	3rd sg.	*esi	*renkai	*turī	*laikāi
Dual	1st du.	*esiu̯ā	*renkaiu̯ā	*turīu̯ā	*laikāiu̯ā
Dual	2nd du.	*esitā	*renkaitā	*turītā	*laikāitā
Dual	3rd du.	*esi	*renkai	*turī	*laikāi
Plural	1st pl.	*esimē	*renkaimē	*turīmē	*laikāimē
Plural	2nd pl.	*esitē	*renkaitē	*turītē	*laikāitē
Plural	3rd pl.	*esi	*renkai	*turī	*laikāi

==== Infinitive ====
In Proto-Baltic the infinitive was created with suffixes *-tei, *-tēi, *-ti: *eitei, *-tēi, *-ti 'go', *darītei, *-tēi, *-ti 'do'. The infinitive comes from the singular nominal of the word stem ti in its dative (*mirtei 'for death') and locative (*mirtēi 'in death'; consonant stem —*darānti 'in doing' (active participle, masculine–neuter) form. In Lithuanian, the relationship between the infinitive and dative can sometimes be observed to this day (e.g. kėdė yra sėdėti / sėdėjimui 'the chair is for sitting', ne metas liūdėti / liūdėjimui 'no time for sadness').

==== Supine ====
In Proto-Baltic the supine was created with suffixes *-tun < PIE *-tum: *eitun, *darītun. This verb form is unconjugated and was used together with the verbs of movement to express the adverbials of a purpose or an intention. The supine comes from the singular nominal of the word stem tu in its accusative form (*leitun 'rain'). The connection can be observed in the existing dialects of the current Baltic languages and is considered to be inherited from PIE as the supine can be found in other Indo-European languages as well.

==== Aspect ====
Aspect (e.g. imperfective aspect Lithuanian: rinkau 'I was gathering' vs. perfective aspect Lithuanian: surinkau 'I had gathered') might have been unusual to Proto-Baltic, as aorist tense, which was used to express a perfective aspect of a process in contrast to the present tense used to express the imperfective aspect, fell out of use.

==== Participle ====
Proto-Baltic had active and passive voice participles. Traditionally, it is believed that active voice participles already existed in PIE. Participles were declined the same way as the nominals. The vocative case probably coincided with the nominative one. The participle had three genders (masculine, feminine and neuter), numbers (singular, dual, plural) and tenses (present, future, past). Active participles were used to express a specific trait of an object that arises as a result of their own doing while passive participles were meant to express a specific trait of an object that arises as a result of someone else taking action.

Present participles of the verbs *rinktei 'gather, collect', *turētei 'have', *laikītei 'hold':

Present active participles
		*o-stem			*i-stem			*ā-stem		
		Masculine	Neuter	Feminine	Masculine	Neuter	Feminine	Masculine	Neuter	Feminine
Singular	Nominative Vocative	*renkants	*renkant	*renkantī	*turints	*turint	*turintī	*laikānts	*laikānt	*laikāntī
Singular	Genitive	*renkantes		*renkanti̯ās	*turintes		*turinti̯ās	*laikāntes		*laikānti̯ās
Singular	Dative	*renkantei		*renkanti̯āi	*turintei		*turinti̯āi	*laikāntei		*laikānti̯āi
Singular	Accusative	*renkantin	*renkant	*renkanti̯ān	*turintin	*turint	*turinti̯ān	*laikāntin	*laikānt	*laikānti̯ān
Singular	Instrumental	*renkantmi		*renkanti̯ān	*turintmi		*turinti̯ān	*laikāntmi		*laikānti̯ān
Singular	Locative	*renkanti		*renkanti̯āi	*turinti		*turinti̯āi	*laikānti		*laikānti̯āi
Dual	Nominative Accusative Vocative	*renkante	*renkantī	*renkanti̯āi	*turinte	*turintī	*turinti̯āi	*laikānte'	*laikāntī	*laikānti̯āi
Dual	Dative Instrumental	*renkantmā		*renkanti̯āmā	*turintmā		*turinti̯āmā	*laikāntmā		*laikānti̯āmā
Dual	Genitive Locative	*renkantaus		*renkanti̯āus	*turintaus		*turinti̯āus	*laikāntaus		*laikānti̯āus
Plural	Nominative Vocative	*renkantes	*renkantā	*renkanti̯ās	*turintes	*turintā	*turinti̯ās	*laikāntes	*laikāntā	*laikānti̯ās
Plural	Genitive	*renkantōn		*renkanti̯ōn	*turintōn		*turinti̯ōn	*laikāntōn		*laikānti̯ōn
Plural	Dative	*renkantmas		*renkanti̯āmas	*turintmas		*turinti̯āmas	*laikāntmas		*laikānti̯āmas
Plural	Accusative	*renkantins	*renkantā	*renkanti̯āns	*turintins	*turintā	*turinti̯āns	*laikāntins	*laikāntā	*laikānti̯āns
Plural	Instrumental	*renkantmīs		*renkanti̯āmīs	*turintmīs		*turinti̯āmīs	*laikāntmīs		*laikānti̯āmīs
Plural	Locative	*renkantsu		*renkanti̯āsu	*turintsu		*turinti̯āsu	*laikāntsu		*laikānti̯āsu

Present passive participles
		*o-stem			*i-stem			*ā-stem		
		Masculine	Neuter	Feminine	Masculine	Neuter	Feminine	Masculine	Neuter	Feminine
Singular	Nominative Vocative	*renkamas	*renkaman / *renkama	*renkamā	*turimas	*turiman / *turima	*turimā	*laikāmas	*laikāman / *laikāma	*laikāmā
Singular	Genitive	*renkamas(a) / *renkamā		*renkamās	*turimas(a) / *turimā		*turimās	*laikāmas(a) / *laikāmā		*laikāmās
Singular	Dative	*renkamōi		renkamāi	*turimōi		*turimāi	*laikāmōi		*laikāmāi
Singular	Accusative	*renkaman	*renkaman / *renkama	*renkamān	*turiman	*turiman /*turima	*turimān	*laikāman	*laikāman / *laikāma	*laikāmān
Singular	Instrumental	*renkamō		*renkamān	*turimō		*turimān	*laikāmō		*laikāmān
Singular	Locative	*renkamei		*renkamāi	*turimei		*turimāi	*laikāmei		*laikāmāi
Dual	Nominative Accusative Vocative	*renkamō	*renkamai	*renkamāi	*turimō	*turimai	*turimāi	*laikāmō	*laikāmai	*laikāmāi
Dual	Dative Instrumental	*renkamamā		*renkamāmā	*turimamā		*turimāmā	*laikāmamā		*laikāmāmā
Dual	Genitive Locative	*renkamōus		*renkamāus	*turimōus		*turimāus	*laikāmōus		*laikāmāus
Plural	Nominative Vocative	*renkamai	*renkamā	*renkamās	*turimai	*turimā	*turimās	*laikāmai	*laikāmā	*laikāmās
Plural	Genitive	*renkamōn			*turimōn			*laikāmōn		
Plural	Dative	*renkamamas		*renkamāmas	*turimamas		*turimāmas	*laikāmamas		*laikāmāmas
Plural	Accusative	*renkamōns	*renkamā	*renkamāns	*turimōns	*turimā	*turimāns	*laikāmōns	*laikāmā	*laikāmāns
Plural	Instrumental	*renkamais		*renkamāmīs	*turimais		*turimāmīs	*laikāmais		*laikāmāmīs
Plural	Locative	*renkameisu		*renkamāsu	*turimeisu		*turimāsu	*laikāmeisu		*laikāmāsu

Future participles of the verbs *būtei 'be', *turētei 'have':

Future active participles
		Infinitive stems (all the verbs)					
		Masculine	Neuter	Feminine	Masculine	Neuter	Feminine
Singular	Nominative Vocative	*būsi̯ants	*būsi̯ant	*būsi̯antī	*turēsi̯ants	*turēsi̯ant	*turēsi̯antī
Singular	Genitive	*būsi̯antes		*būsi̯anti̯ās	*turēsi̯antes		*turēsi̯anti̯ās
Singular	Dative	*būsi̯antei		*būsi̯anti̯āi	*turēsi̯antei		*turēsi̯anti̯āi
Singular	Accusative	*būsi̯antin	*būsi̯ant	*būsi̯anti̯ān	*turēsi̯antin	*turēsi̯ant	*turēsi̯anti̯ān
Singular	Instrumental	*būsi̯antmi		*būsi̯anti̯ān	*turēsi̯antmi		*turēsi̯anti̯ān
Singular	Locative	*būsi̯anti		*būsi̯anti̯āi	*turēsi̯anti		*turēsi̯anti̯āi
Dual	Nominative Accusative Vocative	*būsi̯ante	*būsi̯antī	*būsi̯anti̯āi	*turēsi̯ante	*turēsi̯antī	*turēsi̯anti̯āi
Dual	Dative Instrumental	*būsi̯antmā		*būsi̯anti̯āmā	*turēsi̯antmā		*turēsi̯anti̯āmā
Dual	Genitive Locative	*būsi̯antaus		*būsi̯anti̯āus	*turēsi̯antaus		*turēsi̯anti̯āus
Plural	Nominative Vocative	*būsi̯antes	*būsi̯antā	*būsi̯anti̯ās	*turēsi̯antes	*turēsi̯antā	*turēsi̯anti̯ās
Plural	Genitive	*būsi̯antōn		*būsi̯anti̯ōn	*turēsi̯antōn		*turēsi̯anti̯ōn
Plural	Dative	*būsi̯antmas		*būsi̯anti̯āmas	*turēsi̯antmas		*turēsi̯anti̯āmas
Plural	Accusative	*būi̯antins	*būsi̯antā	*būsi̯anti̯āns	*turēsi̯antins	*turēsi̯antā	*turēsi̯anti̯āns
Plural	Instrumental	*būsi̯antmīs		*būsi̯anti̯āmīs	*turēsi̯antmīs		*turēsi̯anti̯āmīs
Plural	Locative	*būsi̯antsu		*būsi̯anti̯āsu	*turēsi̯antsu		*turēsi̯anti̯āsu

Future passive participles
		Infinitive stems (all the verbs)					
		Masculine	Neuter	Feminine	Masculine	Neuter	Feminine
Singular	Nominative Vocative	*būsi̯amas	*būsi̯aman / *būsi̯ama	*būsi̯amā	*turēsi̯amas	*turēsi̯aman / *turēsi̯ama	*turēsi̯amā
Singular	Genitive	*būsi̯amas(a) / *būsi̯amā		*būsi̯amās	*turēsi̯amas(a) / *turēsi̯amā		*turēsi̯amās
Singular	Dative	*būsi̯amōi		*būsi̯amāi	*turēsi̯amōi		*turēsi̯amāi
Singular	Accusative	*būsi̯aman	*būsi̯aman / *būsi̯ama	*būsi̯amān	*turēsi̯aman	*turēsi̯aman / *turēsi̯ama	*turēsi̯amān
Singular	Instrumental	*būsi̯amō		*būsi̯amān	*turēsi̯amō		*turēsi̯amān
Singular	Locative	*būsi̯amei		*būsi̯amāi	*turēsi̯amei		*turēsi̯amāi
Dual	Nominative Accusative Vocative	*būsi̯amō	*būsi̯amai	*būsi̯amāi	*turēsi̯amō	*turēsi̯amai	*turēsi̯amāi
Dual	Dative Instrumental	*būsi̯amamā		*būsi̯amāmā	*turēsi̯amamā		*turēsi̯amāmā
Dual	Genitive Locative	*būsi̯amōus		*būsi̯amāus	*turēsi̯amōus		*turēsi̯amāus
Plural	Nominative Vocative	*būsi̯amai	*būsi̯amā	*būsi̯amās	*turēsi̯amai	*turēsi̯amā	*turēsi̯amās
Plural	Genitive	*būsi̯amōn			*turēsi̯amōn		
Plural	Dative	*būsi̯amamas		*būsi̯amāmas	*turēsi̯amamas		*turēsi̯amāmas
Plural	Accusative	*būsi̯amōns	*būsi̯amā	*būsi̯amāns	*turēsi̯amōns	*turēsi̯amā	*turēsi̯amāns
Plural	Instrumental	*būsi̯amais		*būsi̯amāmīs	*turēsi̯amais		*turēsi̯amāmīs
Plural	Locative	*būsi̯ameisu		*būsi̯amāsu	*turēsi̯ameisu		*turēsi̯amāsu

Past participles of the verbs *būtei 'be', *turētei 'have', *laikītei 'hold':

Past active participles
		*ā-stem			*ē-stem		
		Masculine	Neuter	Feminine	Masculine	Neuter	Feminine
Singular	Nominative Vocative	*turēi̯ents / *turēi̯ēs	*turēi̯ent / *turēi̯us	*turēi̯usī	*laikents / *laiki̯usēs	*laikent / *laiki̯us	*laiki̯usī
Singular	Genitive	*turēi̯uses		*turēi̯usi̯ās	*laiki̯uses		*laiki̯usi̯ās
Singular	Dative	*turēi̯usei		*turēi̯usi̯āi	*laiki̯usei		*laiki̯usi̯āi
Singular	Accusative	*turēi̯usin	*turēi̯ent / *turēi̯us	*turēi̯usi̯ān	*laiki̯usin	*laikent / *laiki̯us	*laiki̯usi̯ān
Singular	Instrumental	*turēi̯usmi		*turēi̯usi̯ān	*laiki̯usmi		*laiki̯usi̯ān
Singular	Locative	*turēi̯usi		*turēi̯usi̯āi	*laiki̯usi		*laiki̯usi̯āi
Dual	Nominative Accusative Vocative	*turēi̯use	*turēi̯usī	*turēi̯usi̯āi	*laiki̯use	*laiki̯usī	*laiki̯usi̯āi
Dual	Dative Instrumental	*turēi̯usmā		*turēi̯usi̯āmā	*laiki̯usmā		*laiki̯usi̯āmā
Dual	Genitive Locative	*turēi̯usaus		*turēi̯usi̯āus	*laiki̯usaus		*laiki̯usi̯āus
Plural	Nominative Vocative	*turēi̯entes / *turēi̯uses	*turēi̯entā / *turēi̯usā	*turēi̯usi̯ās	*laikentes / *laiki̯uses	*laikentā / *laiki̯usā	*laiki̯usi̯ās
Plural	Genitive	*turēi̯usōn		*turēi̯usi̯ōn	*laiki̯usōn		*laiki̯usi̯ōn
Plural	Dative	*turēi̯usmas		*turēi̯usi̯āmas	*laiki̯usmas		*laiki̯usi̯āmas
Plural	Accusative	*turēi̯usins	*turēi̯entā / *turēi̯usā	*turēi̯usi̯āns	*laiki̯usins	*laikentā / *laiki̯usā	*laiki̯usi̯āns
Plural	Instrumental	*turēi̯usmīs		*turēi̯usi̯āmīs	*laiki̯usmīs		*laiki̯usi̯āmīs
Plural	Locative	*turēi̯u(s)su		*turēi̯usi̯āsu	*laiki̯u(s)su		*laiki̯usi̯āsu

Past passive participles
		Infinitive stems (all the verbs)					
		Masculine	Neuter	Feminine	Masculine	Neuter	Feminine
Singular	Nominative Vocative	*būtas	*būtan / *būta	*būtā	*turētas	*turētan/ *turēta	*turētā
Singular	Genitive	*būtas(a) / *būtā		*būtās	*turētas(a) / *turētā		*turētās
Singular	Dative	*būtōi		*būtāi	*turētōi		*turētāi
Singular	Accusative	*būtan	*būtan / *būta	*būtān	*turētan	*turētan / *turēta	*turētān
Singular	Instrumental	*būtō		*būtān	*turētō		*turētān
Singular	Locative	*būtei		*būtāi	*turētei		*turētāi
Dual	Nominative Accusative Vocative	*būtō	*būtai	*būtāi	*turētō	*turētai	*turētāi
Dual	Dative Instrumental	*būtamā		*būtāmā	*turētamā		*turētāmā
Dual	Genitive Locative	*būtōus		*būtāus	*turētōus		*turētāus
Plural	Nominative Vocative	*būtai	*būtā	*būtās	*turētai	*turētā	*turētās
Plural	Genitive	*būtōn			*turētōn		
Plural	Dative	*būtamas		*būtāmas	*turētamas		*turētāmas
Plural	Accusative	*būtōns	*būtā	*būtāns	*turētōns	*turētā	*turētāns
Plural	Instrumental	*būtais		*būtāmīs	*turētais		*turētāmīs
Plural	Locative	*būteisu		*būtāsu	*turēteisu		*turētāsu

=== Pronouns ===
The inflexions of PIE were already different significantly in comparison to nominals. As in the case of PIE, the demonstrative pronouns of Proto-Baltic could indicate three levels of varying distance from the speaker: close range *šis and *is, distant range *anas, and unspecified range *tas. The latter demonstrative pronoun, which had three grammatical genders, was the equivalent to the third-person. There were two personal pronouns, they had no grammatical gender — *ež (*eš) 'I' and *tu / *tū 'you', which possessed suppletive inflexion forms preserved from PIE. The reflexive pronoun *seu̯e 'oneself' only had a singular form without the nominative as it does in the current Baltic languages. The singular forms of the pronoun *seu̯e were also used with dual and plural objects, i.e. the singular also served as dual and plural.

Dutch Professor Frederik Kortlandt believed that only the oldest and non-renewed pronoun forms should be reconstructed in Proto-Baltic language while Lithuanian linguist-historian Professor Zigmas Zinkevičius believed older pronoun forms only existed at the earliest stages of Proto-Baltic.

==== Personal pronouns ====
First person

Case	Singular	Dual		Plural	
Case	Singular	Older form	Newer form	Older form	Newer form
Nominative	*ež (*eš)	*ṷe		*mes	
Genitive	*mene, *mei	*nōi̯aus	nūi̯aus	*nōsōn	*nūsōn
Dative	*menei, *mei	*nōmā	*nūmā	*nōmas	*nūmas
Accusative	*mēn, *me	*nō	*na	*nōs	*nas
Instrumental	*menimi	*nōmā	*nūmā	*nōmīs	*nūmīs
Locative	*meni	*nōi̯aus	nūi̯aus	*nōsu	*nūsu

Second person

Case	Singular	Dual		Plural	
Case	Singular	Older form	Newer form	Older form	Newer form
Nominative	*tu / *tū	*i̯ū		*i̯ūs	
Genitive	*teṷe, *tei	*ṷōi̯aus	*i̯ūi̯aus	*ṷōsōn	*i̯ūsōn
Dative	*tebei, *tei	*ṷōmā	*i̯ūmā	*ṷōmas	*i̯ūmas
Accusative	*tēn, *te	*ṷō	*ṷa	*ṷōs	*ṷas
Instrumental	*tebimi	*ṷōmā	*i̯ūmā	*ṷōmīs	*i̯ūmīs
Locative	*tebi	*ṷōi̯aus	*i̯ūi̯aus	*ṷōsu	*i̯ūsu

Third person

Demonstrative pronoun *tas was the equivalent to the third person.

Case	Singular			Dual			Plural		
Case	Masculine	Neuter	Feminine	Masculine	Neuter	Feminine	Masculine	Neuter	Feminine
Nominative	*tas	*ta	*tā	*tō	*tai / *tei		*tai / *tei	*tā	*tās
Genitive	*tasi̯a		*tasi̯ās	*ta(i)i̯aus			*teisōn		*tāsōn
Dative	*tasmei		*tasi̯āi	*teimā			*teimas		*tāmas
Accusative	*tan	*ta	*tān	*tō	*tai / *tei		*tōns	*tā	*tāns
Instrumental	*tō		*tān	*teimā			*tais		*tāmīs
Locative	*tasmi		*tāi	*ta(i)i̯aus			*teisu		*tāsu

==== Reflexive pronoun ====
Case	Singular
Genitive	*seu̯e, *sei
Dative	*sebei, *sei
Accusative	*sēn, *se
Instrumental	*sebimi
Locative	*sebi

==== Interrogative pronouns ====
There were two interrogative pronouns—masculine *kat[a/e]ras, neuter *kat[a/e]ra, feminine *kat[a/e]rā, all meaning 'which', and masculine–feminine *kas, neuter *ka, meaning 'who, what'. The latter was used as a relative pronoun in compound sentences. According to Zigmas Zinkevičius, relative pronouns had all three genders, and Vytautas Mažiulis believed pronoun *kas had the feminine form *kā when it was used as a relative pronoun. Interrogative and relative pronouns were inflected the same way as the demonstrative pronoun *tas.

==== Indefinite pronouns ====
Indefinite pronouns, such as masculine *kitas, neuter *kita, feminine *kitā, meaning 'other', or masculine *u̯isas, neuter *u̯isa, feminine *u̯isā, meaning 'all, entire, whole', were also inflected as the pronoun *tas.

==== Possessive pronouns ====
Possessive pronouns indicate divisions between Baltic dialects: the western areal would have forms, such as the masculine *mai̯as, neuter *mai̯a, feminine *mai̯ā 'mine'; masculine *tu̯ai̯as, neuter *tu̯ai̯a, feminine *tu̯ai̯ā 'yours'; masculine *su̯ai̯as, neuter *su̯ai̯a, feminine *su̯ai̯ā 'oneself'. In comparison, the eastern areal would possess forms like the masculine *menas, neuter *mena, feminine *menā; masculine *teu̯as, neuter *teu̯a, feminine *teu̯ā; masculine *seu̯as, neuter *seu̯a, feminine *seu̯ā, respectively. These pronouns would be inflected as other gendered pronouns, although they could have been used only in their genitive form. The eigenvalue of plural and dual possessive pronouns was possibly expressed in the genitive case of plural personal pronouns (e.g. *nōsōn (→*nūsōn) 'ours', *ṷōsōn (→*i̯ūsōn) 'yours').

		Western Baltic areal			Eastern Baltic areal			Meaning
		Masculine	Neuter	Feminine	Masculine	Neuter	Feminine	Meaning
Singular	1st	*mai̯as	*mai̯a	*mai̯ā	*menas	*mena	*menā	'mine'
Singular	2nd	*tu̯ai̯as	*tu̯ai̯a	*tu̯ai̯ā	*teu̯as	*teu̯a	*teu̯ā	'yours'

Western Baltic pronouns masculine *su̯ai̯as, neuter *su̯ai̯a, feminine *su̯ai̯ā 'oneself', Eastern Baltic ones masculine *seu̯as, neuter *seu̯a, feminine *seu̯ā 'oneself' could be used with all persons. The equivalent of third person possessive pronoun was the genitive case of the demonstrative pronoun *tas, which had three numbers and genders.

=== Numerals ===
==== Cardinal numbers ====
Cardinal number 6 has three different reflexes in the Balto-Slavic languages: one in Latvian and pre-Lithuanian, another one in Old Prussian and a final one in Proto-Slavic. Hence, number 6 in PBS had either two or three versions: one version with a reflex in Proto-Slavic and either one single version or two different versions with two reflexes in PB. The hypothetical form of number 6 in PBS with medial *-w- is reconstructed by Vytautas Mažiulis (2004).

Cardinal number	PIE	PBS	PB
One (1)	*h₁óynos (m.) *h₁óyneh₂ (f.) *h₁óynom (n.)	*aiˀnas *aiˀnāˀ *aiˀna	*ainas; *einas *ainā *aina
Two (2)	*dwóh₁ *dwóy(h₁)	*duwō *duwai	*d(u)u̯ō *d(u)u̯ai
Three (3)	*tréyes	*tríjes	*trii̯es
Four (4)	*kʷetwóres	*ketū́res	*ketures
Five (5)	*pénkʷe	*pénki	*penkes
Six (6)	*swéḱs	*séš? *uš? [*šéš] (*sweš)	*sešes (> Ltv. seši, pre-Lith. *seši) Proto-Western-Baltic *us [> PS *šȅstь] (> both PB *sešes and *us)
Seven (7)	*septḿ̥	*septín	*septines
Eight (8)	*oḱtṓw	*aśtṓ	*aštōnes
Nine (9)	*h₁néwn̥	*néwin (> variant *dewin)	*neu̯ines (> PS *dȅvętь)
Ten (10)	*déḱm̥ > *déḱm̥t	*déśimt	*dešimts

Numerals in Proto-Baltic, except for 'two', had noun endings: *ainas / *einas (PIE: *h₁óynos) 'one' was inflected the same way as noun word stems o (masculine and neuter) and ā (feminine), this numeral had a singular, dual and plural number;

masculine *d(u)u̯ō (PIE: *dwóh₁) and feminine-neuter *d(u)u̯ai (PIE: *dwóy(h₁)) 'two' was inflected as a demonstrative pronoun dual;

*trii̯es (masc. PIE: *tréyes) 'three' was inflected as a plural noun with the word stem i and was common for all genders;

eventually, *ketures (masc. PIE: *kʷetwóres) 'four' was inflected as a plural noun with the consonant word stem r and was also the same for all three genders.

	*d(u)u̯ō 'two'			*trii̯es 'three'	*ketures 'four'
	Masculine	Neuter	Feminine	*trii̯es 'three'	*ketures 'four'
Nominative	*d(u)u̯ō	*d(u)u̯ai		*trii̯es	*ketures
Genitive	*d(u)u̯a(i)i̯aus			*trii̯ōn	*keturōn
Dative	*d(u)u̯eimā			*trimas	*keturmas
Accusative	*d(u)u̯ō	*d(u)u̯ai		*trins	*keturins
Instrumental	*d(u)u̯eimā			*trimīs	*keturmīs
Locative	*d(u)u̯a(i)i̯aus			*trisu	*ketursu

Proto-Baltic people applied the principles for *ketures (PIE: *kʷetwóres) 'four' inflexion to numerals *penkes (PIE: *pénkʷe) 'five', *ušes / *sešes < *su̯ešes (PIE:*(s)wéḱs) 'six', *septines (PIE: *septḿ̥) 'seven', *aštōnes (PIE: *(h₁)oḱtṓw) 'eight' and *neu̯ines (PIE: *h₁néwn̥) 'nine'.

In PIE, numerals from five to nine were not inflected. The early Proto-Baltic might have retained the uninflected numeral forms of *su̯eš, *septin 'seven', *aštō 'eight', *neu̯in 'nine' as well. The reconstruction of Latvian language indicates that *septines 'seven' and *neu̯ines 'nine' with the short *i is plausible. The numeral 10, *dešimts (PIE *deḱmt- < *deḱṃ), was declined as the root noun and had all three numbers.

==== Ordinal numbers ====
The masculine and neuter ordinal numbers were inflected as nouns possessing word stem o while feminine ones were inflected as nouns with word stem ā. Ordinal number 6 has two reflexes in the Baltic Languages from PBS; these two reflexes could have come from either two different form in PBS or a single form; the hypothetical single form, with medial *-w-, is reconstructed by Vytautas Mažiulis (2004).

Ordinal numbers from first to tenth in Proto-Baltic were as follows:

Ordinal number	PIE	PBS	PB
First	*pr̥h₃wós *pr̥̄'mos (*pr̥h₃mós?)	*pírˀwas *pírˀmas	(> PS *pьrvъ) *pirmas
Second	*h₂énteros *(h₁)witoros	*ántaras *witaras	*antaras (> PS *vъtorъ)
Third	*trit(y)ós	*tirtias > *tretias	*treti̯as
Fourth	*kʷ(e)twr̥tós	*ketwirtas	*ketu̯irtas
Fifth	*penkʷetós	*penktas	*penktas
Sixth (a)	*sweḱstós *weḱstós? *uḱstós?	*seśtas *uśtas (*sweštas)	*seštas > Ltv. sestais, pre-Lith. *seštas *uštas > Pruss. *ustas > usts/uschts (according to Dereven) (> both PB *seštas and *uštas)
Seventh	*septm̥mós	*septmas	*septmas (> Old Lith. sekmas)
Eight	*oḱtowós > *oḱtmos? (by analogy with *septm̥mós)	*aśtmas	*aštmas (> Old Lith. ašmas)
Ninth	*h₁newn̥nós > *h₁newntós? (by analogy with other numerals)	*newin(t)as *dewin(t)as	*neu̯intas (> Pruss. newīnts) (> PS devętъ; Lith. devintas)
Tenth	*deḱm̥tós	*deśimtás	*dešimtas
