= Gs 13 =

Runestone in Gävle, Sweden

Coordinates: 60.6727°N 17.1380°E

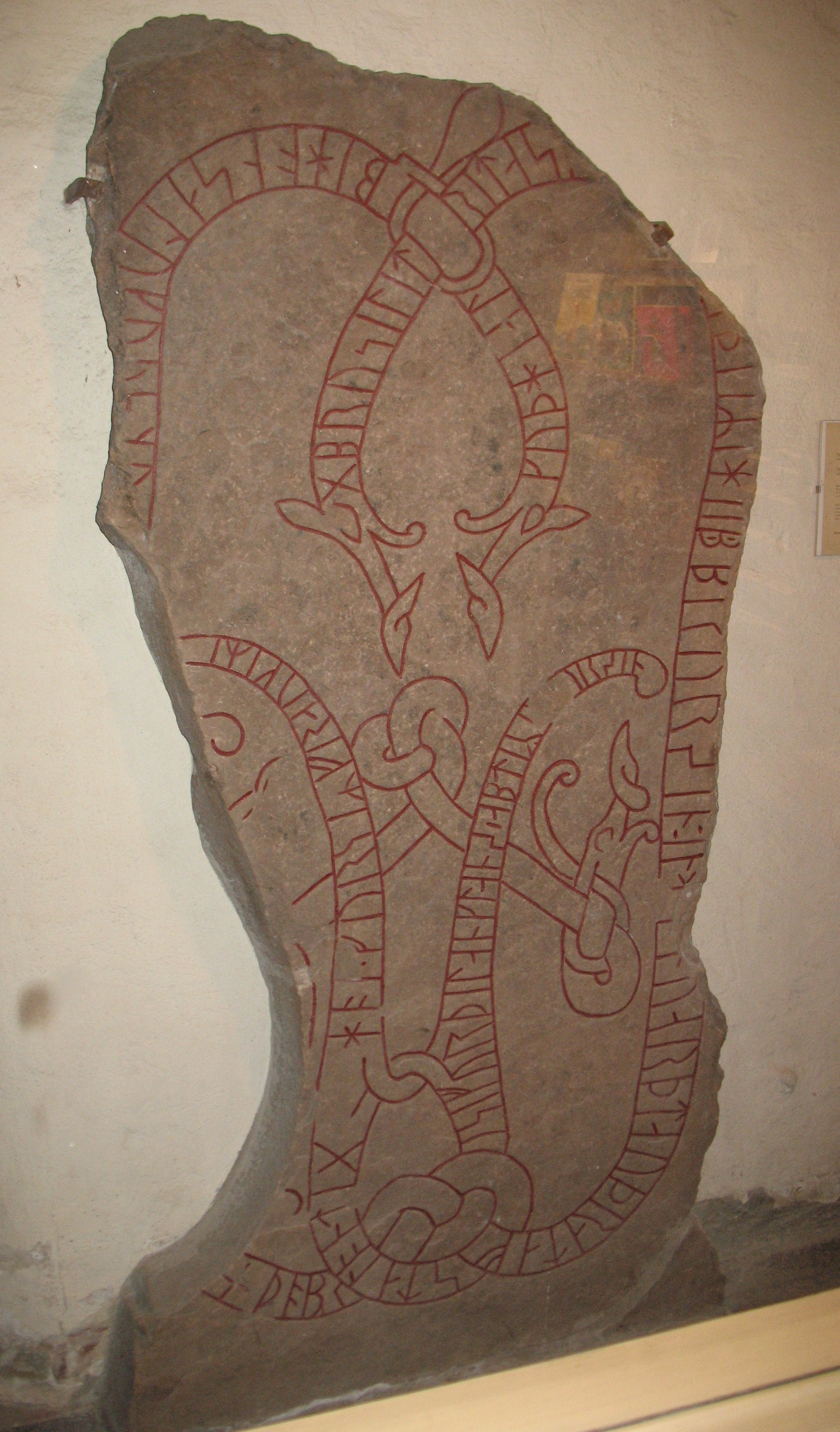
Runestone Gs 13 in church in Gävle.

Gästrikland Runic Inscription 13 or Gs 13 is a runestone carved on red sandstone located in a church in Gävle, Gästrikland. It was carved in the 11th century by the runemaster Åsmund Kåresson.

The place name Tafeistaland (modern Swedish: Tavastland) in the inscription refers to a geographical region in Finland. The runic text for three consecutive words follows the rule that two consecutive identical letters are represented by a single rune, even when the two identical letters are at the end of one word and the start of a second word. When the text shown as Latin characters, the transliterated runes are doubled and separate words are shown. The rune sequence honsalukuþ is shown in the inscription below as hons| |salu| |uk| |kuþ(s) by doubling the s-, u-, and k-runes and separating the three words.

== Runic inscription ==
Original inscription:

× brusi lit rita s-... ... [(a)]b--ʀ (i)h(i)(l) brur sin : in h-n uarþ tauþr a tafstalonti × þo brusi furþi lank lans ' abtiʀ [br](u)r sin h(o)[n] fur (m)iʀ fraukiʀi kuþ hialbi hons| |salu| |uk| |kuþ(s) (m)(u)[þiʀ ' suain ' uk osmunrt ' þaiʀ markaþu] +

The inscription has been translated into English in two ways:

- Brúsi had this stone erected in memory of Egill, his brother. And he died in Tafeistaland, when Brúsi brought [= led?] the land's levy[?] [= army] in memory of his brother. He traveled with Freygeirr. May God and God's mother help his soul. Sveinn and Ásmundr, they marked.
- Brúsi had this stone erected in memory of Egill, his brother. And he died in Tafeistaland, when Brúsi bore long-spear [=battle standard] after his brother. He travelled with Freygeirr. May God and God's mother help his soul. Sveinn and Ásmundr, they marked.
