= Mi-verbs =

The -mi verbs are a class of athematic verbs in the Proto-Indo-European language. The name derives from the first-person singular form of the verbs in the present indicative active. The person marker is -mi, e.g. εἰμί (eimí, I am), δίδωμι (dídōmi, I give), φημί (phēmí, I say) etc. The conjugation of mi-verbs differs from the conjugation of the much more common, thematic, omega-verbs (-ω, -ō). Mi-verbs were “regularised” (transformed to their -o counterparts, or replaced altogether) in the Koine era and the transformation was almost complete by Byzantine times, with some vestiges of the -mi conjugation surviving only in the passive voice in Modern Greek.

Mi-verbs are an extremely ancient feature of Proto-Indo-European grammar. Sanskrit verbs are exclusively -mi verbs, all Latin verbs except the forms sum and inquam are -o verbs, whereas Ancient Greek verbs could be either. A typical example used to illustrate this is the Sanskrit verb bhárami, Latin fero, Greek φέρω, phérō (“I bear”).

The most common verb is the copula, and therefore it has survived longest, just as in Latin the only Anglo-Saxon mi-verb is the copula eom, nowadays shortened to am. The verb "give" is also very common and is, together with the copula, still a mi-verb in modern Slavic languages (for example, the Czech word dávám).

== Sources ==
- Greek Grammar, Herbert Weir Smyth. Harvard University Press. (1920) 0-574-36250-0
