= Jorma Koivulehto =

Finnish philologist

Jorma Juhani Koivulehto (Finnish pronunciation: [ˈjormɑ ˈjuhɑni ˈkoi̯ʋulehto]; 12 October 1934 in Tampere – 23 August 2014 in Helsinki) was a Finnish philologist.

At University of Helsinki, he was adjunct professor from 1973 to 1983, and later full professor of Germanic philology from 1983 to 1998. His research concerned Indo-European loans in the Finnish language and was therefore part of the Finnish historical-comparative research tradition which started in the late 18th century. In a series of articles, for instance Indogermanisch-Uralisch: Lehnbeziehungen oder (auch) Urverwandschaft? (1994) and Zur indogermanisch-germanischen Kontinuität in der Nachbarschaft der Finnougrier (1995), he proposes a theory regarding the stratification of loanwords in Finnish. According to this theory, the oldest loans were borrowed into Finnish in the Bronze Age, which would indicate that Finns at this time lived by the Baltic Sea.
