= Suomen kronikka =

Historically inaccurate 1670s chronicle

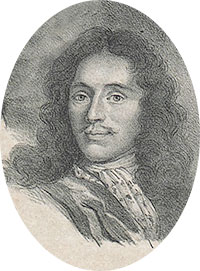
Elias Brenner, the most likely candidate as an author of the chronicle.

Suomen kronikka (Latin: Chronicon Finlandiae, lit. 'The Chronicle of Finland') is a chronicle written in the 1670s describing the history of Finland up to the Middle Ages.

The writer is unknown, but the most likely candidate is painter Elias Brenner. He was a known patron of Finns and Finland and his stages of life support the possibility. If Brenner is the author of the chronicle, it was written between 1672 and 1674. The original chronicle was published in Latin in 1728 by Christian Nettelblad.

The chronicle was aimed at creating a great past to Finns who were still under Swedish rule. This is possibly the reason that it was printed only after the death of the author (if Brenner, 1717) and the fall of the Swedish Empire (1721).

The author mainly uses sagas and historians as sources of the chronicle, such as Saxo Grammaticus, Bartholomeus Anglicus, Johannes Magnus, Olaus Magnus, Anders Bure, Michael Wexionius and Snorri Sturluson.
