= Rute Church =

- Rute kyrka
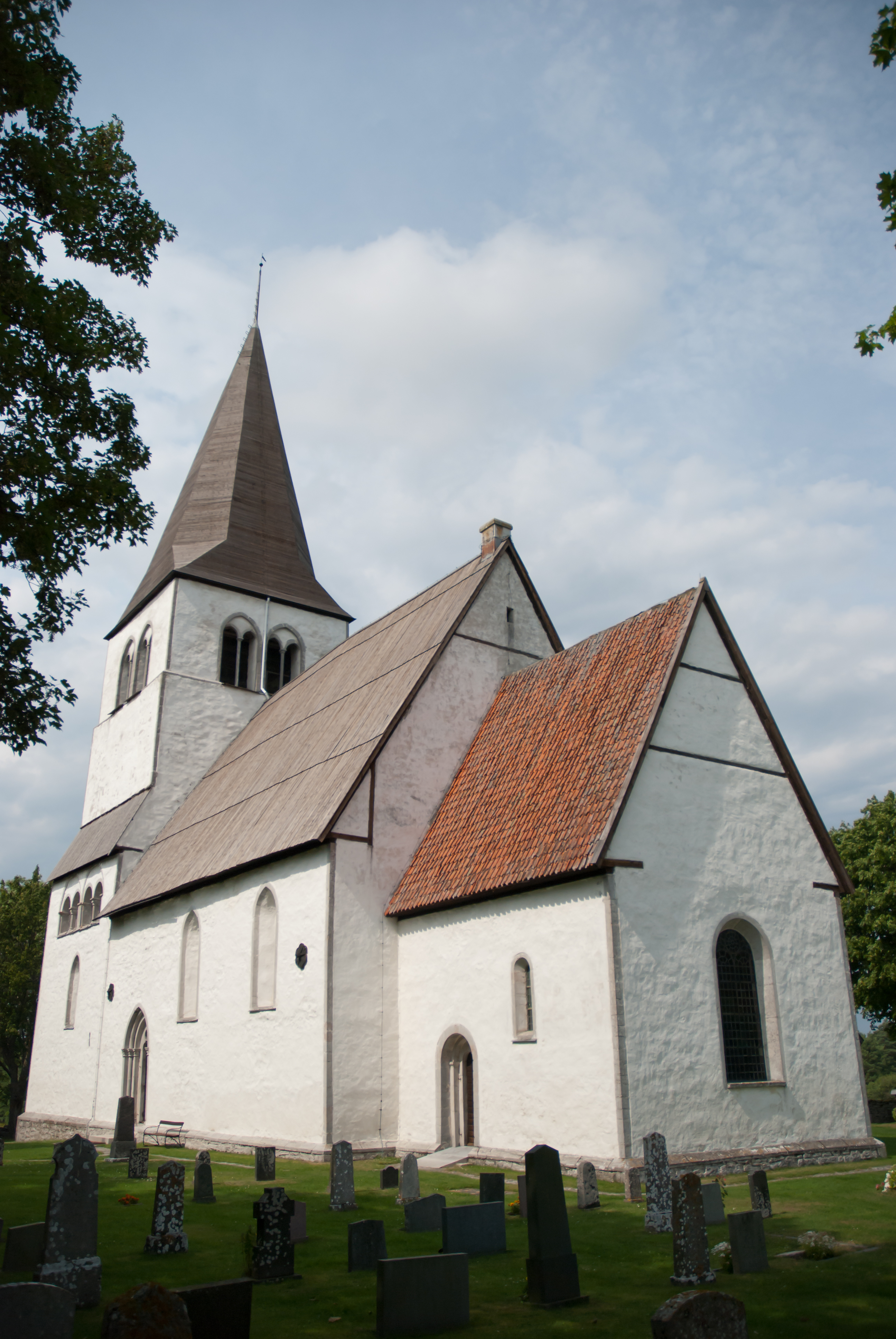
- Rute Church, view of the exterior

- Location on Gotland
- 57°50′01″N 18°55′25″E
- Country: Sweden
- Denomination: Church of Sweden

Administration
- Diocese: Visby

Rute Church (Swedish: Rute kyrka) is a medieval church in Rute on the Swedish island of Gotland, in the Baltic Sea. The 13th-century church contains medieval murals, and is unusual in that its vaults are supported by square pillars and not round columns. It belongs to the Diocese of Visby.

== History and architecture ==
The oldest part of the church is the choir, built c. 1230. The nave was built around ten years later, while the tower and the west portal were the last parts of the church to be built. The church interior was decorated with murals during the late Middle Ages. These were executed by the artist known as the Master of the Passion of Christ and were rediscovered during a renovation in 1951.

The church ceiling is supported by square pillars, a solution not found in any other church on Gotland. Among the furnishings, several are medieval. The baptismal font dates from the mid-13th century, while the triumphal cross was made c. 1260. A decorated tombstone, carrying inscriptions with runes, was found during the 1951 renovation and dates from the 12th century. The altarpiece is made of sandstone and may originally have been placed in the church of Visborg Castle.
