= Battle at Herdaler =

Battle in Finland

The Battle at Herdaler was a battle between the Norse Viking leader Olav Haraldsson (later King Olaf II of Norway, also Saint Olaf) and local Finnish people at Herdaler in Finland around years 1007/8. The Saga of Olaf Haraldson tells how Olav raided the coasts of Finland and was almost killed in the battle.

After this they sailed to Finland and plundered there, and went
up the country. All the people fled to the forest, and they had
emptied their houses of all household goods. The king went far
up the country, and through some woods, and came to some
dwellings in a valley called Herdaler, -- where, however, they
made but small booty, and saw no people; and as it was getting
late in the day, the king turned back to his ships. Now when
they came into the woods again people rushed upon them from all
quarters, and made a severe attack. The king told his men to
cover themselves with their shields, but before they got out of
the woods he lost many people, and many were wounded; but at
last, late in the evening, he got to the ships. The Finlanders
conjured up in the night, by their witchcraft, a dreadful storm
and bad weather on the sea; but the king ordered the anchors to
be weighed and sail hoisted, and beat off all night to the
outside of the land. The king's luck prevailed more than the
Finlanders' witchcraft; for he had the luck to beat round the
Balagard's side in the night. and so got out to sea. But the
Finnish army proceeded on land, making the same progress as the
king made with his ships. So says Sigvat: --

"The third fight was at Herdaler, where
The men of Finland met in war
The hero of the royal race,
With ringing sword-blades face to face.
Off Balagard's shore the waves
Ran hollow; but the sea-king saves
His hard-pressed ship, and gains the lee
Of the east coast through the wild sea."

The location of "Herdaler" in Finland is not certain. The expedition's possible place could have been in Uusimaa in Hirdal in the present-day town of Inkoo. That makes it the first mentioning of a place located in present-day Finland in historical literature.

== See also ==
- Prehistoric Finnish wars
