= Finnveden =

Historic region of Småland, Sweden

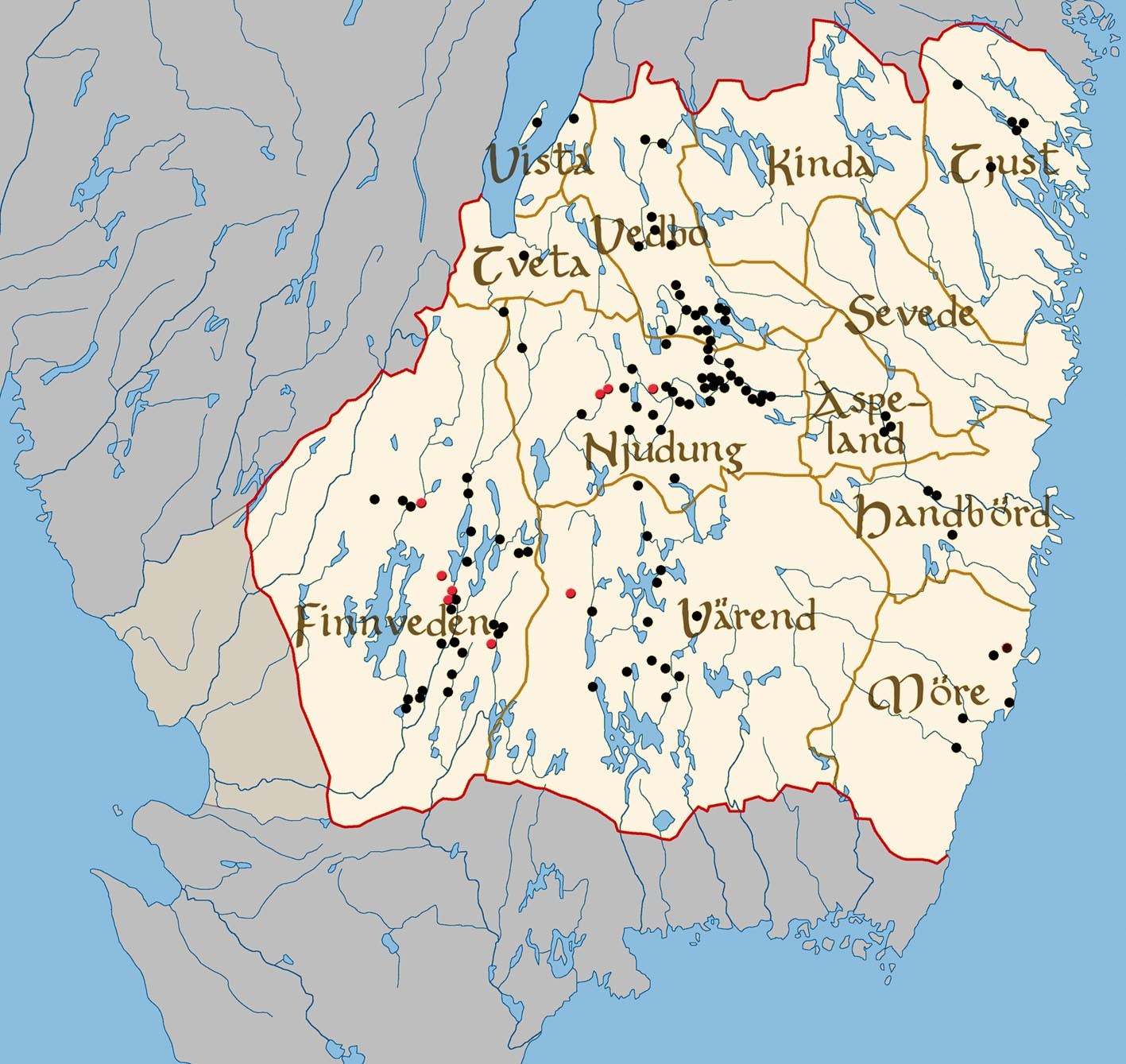
The small lands of Småland, Sweden. The black and red spots indicate runestones. The red spots indicate runestones telling of long voyages. Most runestones in Finnveden describe men who died in England.

Finnveden or Finnheden is one of the ancient small lands of Småland. It corresponded to the hundreds of Sunnerbo, Östbo and Västbo. Finnveden had its own judicial system and laws, as did the other small lands. Finnveden is situated around lake Bolmen and the river Lagan. Most runestones in Finnveden describe men who died in England. Finnveden is today divided and is a part of the counties of Halland, Kronoberg and Jönköping.

It was first mentioned by Jordanes when he referred to its population as the Finnaithae (derived from an old form of Finnheden, Finn(h)aith-) when describing the nations of Scandza in Getica.

== Etymology ==
The Scandinavian placenames Finnveden, Finnmark and the province of Finland (which gave name to Finland) are all thought to be derived from finn, an ancient Germanic word for nomadic hunter-gatherers (cf. to find).

== See also ==
- Fenni
