= Runestone G 319 =

13th-century runestone in Sweden

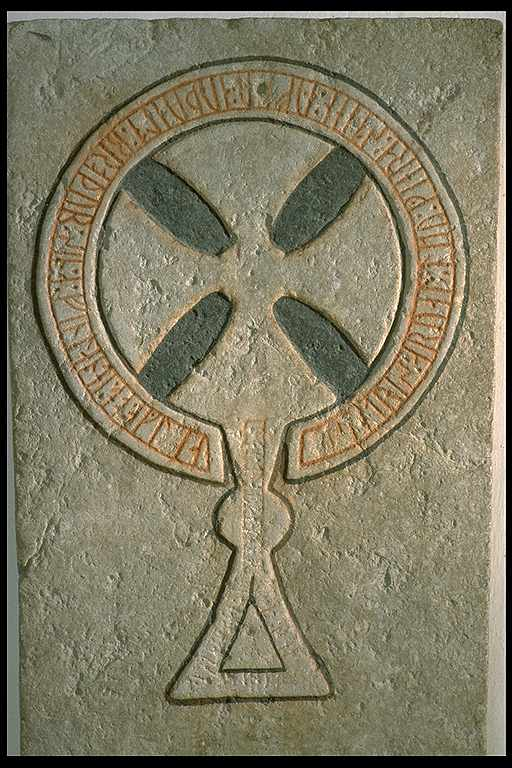
Runestone G 319 in Rute church in Gotland

Runestone G 319 is the Rundata catalog number for a runic inscription on a runestone made from limestone that is located in the Rute church in Gotland, Sweden.

== Description ==
The runestone, which is 1.76 meters tall and 0.765 meters wide, is dated to the years 1200 – 1250. Similar to many runestones, it was repurposed and used in the construction of a church. It was first described as being in the Rute church in a runestone survey published 1749. The stone was hidden under a wooden floor in the 1870s, and removed to its current location during a church restoration in 1951. It is the only Gotland runestone that mentions Finland. The word "Aglia" at the end of the inscription is problematic, but it has been interpreted as focusing the place of death of Audvalds.

This runestone is considered to be one of the Baltic area runestones, which are Varangian runestones raised in memory of men who took part in peaceful or warlike expeditions across the Baltic Sea, where Finland and the Baltic states are presently located.

== Inscription ==
Original inscription:

si[h]tris : aruar[r] : litu : giera : st[a]en : yfir : auþu-l- : broþur : sin : a : finlandi : do : aglia...

Translation to Old West Norse:

Sigtryggs(?) arfar létu gera stein yfir Auðv[a]l[d](?), bróður sinn, á Finnlandi dó 〈aglia...〉.

Translation to English:

Sigtryggr's(?) heirs had the stone made over Auðvaldr(?), their brother, who died in Finland ...
