= Etymology of Kven =

Origin of the ethnonym "Kven"

The origin of the ethnonym Kven is uncertain. The term is used today by the Kvens of northern Norway and by some Tornedalians in northern Sweden.

The earliest known references to the term appear in Old English and Old Norse sources from the late ninth to the thirteenth centuries. The first recorded mention occurs in a ninth-century Old English Orosius, which includes an account of the Norwegian traveler Ohthere, who describes the Cwenas as a distinct group living in the far north, east of the Scandinavian mountains. Icelandic sagas, such as the Orkneyinga saga and Egil's Saga, also refer to Kvenland, suggesting it was regarded as a real geographical region during the Viking Age.

Norwegian annals record a raid by the Kvens on Hålogaland in 1271, marking the last known appearance of Kvens in medieval Scandinavian written records. There are no mentions of the Kvens or Kvenland in medieval Swedish sources. This absence suggests that the ethnonym was used primarily within western Scandinavia, where it may have served to distinguish Finnish-speaking groups from Norwegians and Sámi.

From the 16th century onward, Finnish-speaking individuals began appearing in Norwegian tax records under the names Quæn or Qvæn. Larger waves of migration from Finland to northern Norway followed in the 18th and 19th centuries. The modern Kven population largely descends from these settlers, who established communities along the fjords of northern Troms and Finnmark.

== Proposals ==
Various etymologies have been proposed over time. A common suggestion, first presented by Jouko Vahtola, is that kven etymologically originates from Old Norse hvein, meaning "swampy land."

Nevertheless, kven is a root which in some cases translates to "woman" in Old Norse. Proto-Germanic *kwinōn, *kunōn; *kwēni-z, *kwēnō "woman" developed into various Old Norse forms: kona; kvǟn, kvān, kvɔ̄n; kvendi; kvenna, kvinna. A reference to Terra Feminarum ("Woman Land") in Gesta Hammaburgensis ecclesiae pontificum by Adam of Bremen in 1075 CE is likely a translation of Kvenland. A 14th-century Icelandic manuscript describes a kuenna land ("Woman Land") north of India populated by hermaphroditic women.

Alternatively, kven may be linked to Kainuu, a region of Eastern Finland whose etymology is also disputed. Similar sounding words to "kainuu" also exist in the Sami languages. In Northern Sami, Gáidnu is a rope made of roots for boats or fishing nets. Gáidnulaŝ refers to a clumsy person and Geaidnu stands for a road or a way. In the early Sami dictionaries Kainolats/Kainahaljo had the meaning Norwegian or Swedish man while Kainahalja had the meaning Norwegian or Swedish women, it could also have the meaning peasant. Helsing village, close to Torneå, was referred to as Cainho.
