= Jacob Ziegler =

German scholar, humanist and theologian (c. 1470/71 – 1549)

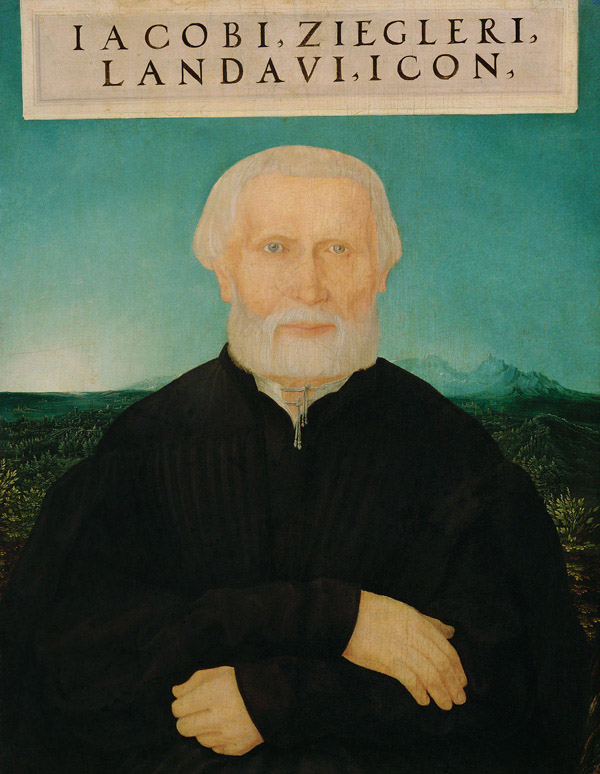
Jacob Ziegler

Jacob Ziegler (c. 1470/71 – August 1549) was a humanist and theologian from Landau an der Isar in Bavaria. He was an itinerant scholar of geography and cartographer, who lived a wandering life in Europe. He studied at the University of Ingolstadt in the 1490s where he befriended Conrad Celtes and Willibald Pirckheimer. Then spent some time at the court of Pope Leo X before he converted to Protestantism; subsequently his geographical works were placed on the Index Librorum Prohibitorum.

For a time he taught at Vienna; in his old age, 1545–49, he lived in the house of Wolfgang Salm, Bishop of Passau. His portrait by Wolf Huber (c. 1485–1553), executed about 1540, when he was about seventy years old, is in the Kunsthistorisches Museum, Vienna.

His main geographical treatise, Schondia, was published under the title Quae intus continentur Syria, Palestina, Arabia, Aegyptus, Schondia, Holmiae... at Strasbourg in 1532. He was also a publisher of maps where he influenced Gerardus Mercator, who mentioned Ziegler's maps contained numerous inconsistencies and errors.

The Swedish historian Johannes Messenius claimed that Ziegler served as a professor of mathematics at Uppsala University in 1540. However, this assertion has later been challenged by subsequent scholars, including Johannes Schefferus and Johann Georg Schelhorn.
