= Runestone U 582 =

Lost Swedish runestone

Coordinates: 59.8842°N 18.7002°E

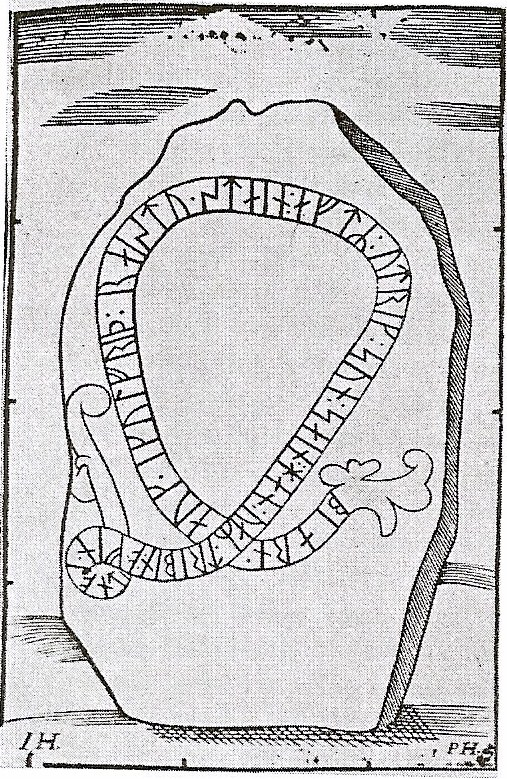
Drawing of Runestone U 582 from the 17th century

Runestone U 582 is a runestone formerly located by the church of Söderby-Karl, Norrtälje municipality, in the Roslagen area on the east coast of Sweden. It has been lost since some time before 1830. The runestone has been dated to the 11th century.

== Inscription ==
ᛒᛁᛅᚱᚾ᛫ᛅᚢᚴ᛫ᛁᚴᚢᛚᚠᚱᛁᚦ᛬ᚱᛅᛁᛋᛏᚢ᛫ᛋᛏᛅᛁᚾ᛬ᛅᚠᛏᛦ᛬ᚢᛏᚱᛁᚴ᛬ᛋᚢᚾ᛬ᛋᛅᛁᚾ᛬ᚼᛅᚾ᛬ᚢᛅᛦ᛫ᛏᚱᛁᛒᛁᚾ᛬ᚭ᛫ᚠᛁᚾ᛫ᛚᚭᚾᛏᛁ

biarn auk * ikulfriþ : raistu : stain : aftʀ : utrik : sun : sain * han * uaʀ : tribin : o * fin*lonti

Translation in old west Norse: Bjǫrn ok Ígulfríðr reistu stein eptir Ótrygg, son sinn. Hann var drepinn á Finnlandi.

Translation in English: Bjǫrn and Ígulfríðr raised the stone in memory of Ótryggr, their son. He was killed in Finland.

== See also ==
- List of runestones
