= Jules Gros (journalist) =

French journalist (1829–1891)

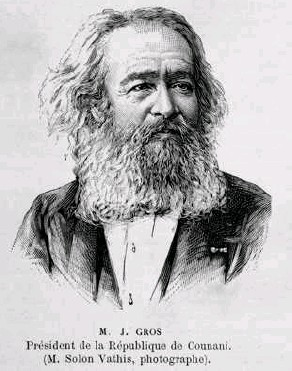

President of Republic of Independent Guiana
- In office May 1887 – 17 September 1887

Personal details
- Born: Jean Jules Gros; 16 March 1829 Montluel, France
- Died: 30 July 1891 (aged 62) Vanves, France
- Occupation: Journalist, politician

Jules Gros (French pronunciation: [ʒyl ɡʁo]; 3 March 1829 – 30 July 1891) was a French journalist and Secretary of the Société de géographie. He became the President of the unrecognised Republic of Independent Guyana in South America in May 1887, but was deposed in September 1887.

== Biography ==
Gros was born Jean Jules Gros on 16 March 1829 in Montluel, France. Gros became a journalist who specialized in geographical subjects. He wrote for the newspaper Le Petit Journal, and the magazines Le Tour du Monde and Le Journal des Voyages among others. He was a member of the Société de géographie and had served as the Secretary for the organisation.

== Republic of Independent Guiana ==
Independent Guiana is marked in green, and roughly equates to Amapá

The borders between French Guiana and Brazil were not clear, and it was decided that the area between the Amazon and the Oyapock River was a neutral territory. Paul Quartier who had visited the territory in 1883, returned in 1885 and had a meeting with the village chiefs of Cunani and Carsewenne (nowadays: Calçoene). In 1886, the Republic of Independent Guiana was founded by a group of French adventurers and two village chiefs with Cunani as the Capital.

Quartier and his men knew Gros who had written about their Republic in Le Journal des Voyages. In May 1887, Gros was informed by telegram in Paris that he had been elected president. Gros immediately started to write articles for the press, and temporarily administered the country from Paris. He accused an official of the new republic of smuggling. The smuggler accused Gros of alcoholism, and Gros retaliated by firing all officials. On 17 September 1887, Gros was deposed as president. Gros refused to accept the dismissal, appointed himself President for life, and boarded a British ship to French Guiana. The British government was informed of his presence by France, and in British Guiana, he was removed from the ship, and returned to France.

Gros died on 30 July 1891 in Vanves, France at the age of 62.

== See also ==
- Adolphe Brezet
