= List of World Heritage Sites in Northern Europe =

The UNESCO (United Nations Educational, Scientific and Cultural Organization) has designated 37 World Heritage Sites in eight countries (also called "state parties") commonly referred to as Northern Europe: Iceland, Norway, Sweden, Finland, Denmark, Estonia, Latvia and Lithuania, i.e. a combination of Nordic and Baltic countries. The Danish territory of the Faroe Islands doesn't have any sites. Greenland, lying on the North American continent, is not included in this list despite its political ties with Denmark; it is included in the List of World Heritage Sites in North America. The United Kingdom and Ireland are included in Western Europe even though they are sometimes listed in Northern Europe.

Sweden is home to the most inscribed sites with 15 sites, two of which are transborder properties. Three sites are shared between several countries: the Curonian Spit (Lithuania and Russia), the High Coast / Kvarken Archipelago (Sweden and Finland) and the Struve Geodetic Arc (ten countries in Northern and Eastern Europe). The first sites from the region were inscribed in 1979, when the Urnes Stave Church and Bryggen, both in Norway were chosen a year after the list's conception. Each year, UNESCO's World Heritage Committee may inscribe new sites on the list, or delist sites that no longer meet the criteria. Selection is based on ten criteria: six for cultural heritage (i–vi) and four for natural heritage (vii–x). Some sites, designated "mixed sites," represent both cultural and natural heritage. In Northern Europe, there are 32 cultural, 4 natural, and 1 mixed sites.

The World Heritage Committee may also specify that a site is endangered, citing "conditions which threaten the very characteristics for which a property was inscribed on the World Heritage List." None of the sites in Northern Europe has ever been listed as endangered, though possible danger listing has been considered by UNESCO in a number of cases.

== Legend ==
Site; named after the World Heritage Committee's official designation
Location; at city, regional, or provincial level and geocoordinates
Criteria; as defined by the World Heritage Committee
Area; in hectares and acres. If available, the size of the buffer zone has been noted as well. A value of zero implies that no data has been published by UNESCO
Year; during which the site was inscribed to the World Heritage List
Description; brief information about the site, including reasons for qualifying as an endangered site, if applicable

== World Heritage Sites ==
* Trans-border site

Site	Image	Location	Criteria	Area ha (acre)	Year	Description
Agricultural Landscape of Southern Öland		Kalmar, Sweden; 56°19′30″N 16°29′00″E	Cultural: (iv), (v)	56,323 (139,177); buffer zone 6,069 (14,997)	2000	The southern part of the island of Öland in the Baltic Sea is dominated by a vast limestone plateau. Human beings have lived here for some five thousand years and adapted their way of life to the physical constraints of the island. As a consequence, the landscape is unique, with abundant evidence of continuous human settlement from prehistoric times to the present day.
Birka and Hovgården		Stockholm, Sweden; 59°20′07″N 17°32′34″E	Cultural: (iii), (iv)	—	1993	The Birka archaeological site is located on Björkö Island in Lake Mälar and was occupied in the 9th and 10th centuries. Hovgården is situated on the neighbouring island of Adelsö. Together, they make up an archaeological complex which illustrates the elaborate trading networks of Viking-Age Europe and their influence on the subsequent history of Scandinavia. Birka was also important as the site of the first Christian congregation in Sweden, founded in 831 by St. Ansgar.
Bronze Age Burial Site of Sammallahdenmäki		Rauma (Lappi), Satakunta, Finland; 61°07′14″N 21°46′39″E	Cultural: (iii), (iv)	—	1999	This Bronze Age burial site features more than 30 granite burial cairns, providing a unique insight into the funerary practices and social and religious structures of northern Europe more than three millennia ago.
Bryggen		Bergen, Vestland, Norway; 60°23′50″N 05°19′23″E	Cultural: (iii)	—	1979	Bryggen, the old wharf of Bergen, is a reminder of the town's importance as part of the Hanseatic League's trading empire from the 14th to the mid-16th century. Many fires, the last in 1955, have ravaged the characteristic wooden houses of Bryggen. Its rebuilding has traditionally followed old patterns and methods, thus leaving its main structure preserved, which is a relic of an ancient wooden urban structure once common in Northern Europe. Today, some 62 buildings remain of this former townscape.
Christiansfeld, a Moravian Church Settlement		Christiansfeld, Kolding Municipality, Southern Denmark, Denmark; 55°21′20″N 09°28′53″E	Cultural: (iii), (iv)	—	2015	Founded in 1773 in South Jutland, the site is an example of a planned settlement of the Moravian Church, a Lutheran free congregation centred in Herrnhut, Saxony. The town was planned to represent the Protestant urban ideal, constructed around a central Church square. The architecture is homogenous and unadorned, with one and two-storey buildings in yellow brick with red tile roofs. The democratic organization of the Moravian Church, with its pioneering egalitarian philosophy, is expressed in its humanistic town planning. The settlement's plan opens onto agricultural land and includes important buildings for the common welfare such as large communal houses for the congregation's widows and unmarried men and women. The buildings are still in use and many are still owned by the local Moravian Church community .
Church Village of Gammelstad, Luleå		Norrbotten, Sweden; 65°38′46″N 22°1′43″E	Cultural: (ii), (iv), (v)	—	1996	Gammelstad, at the head of the Gulf of Bothnia, is the best-preserved example of a 'church village', a unique kind of village formerly found throughout northern Scandinavia. The 424 wooden houses, huddled round the early 15th-century stone church, were used only on Sundays and at religious festivals to house worshippers from the surrounding countryside who could not return home the same day because of the distance and difficult travelling conditions.
Curonian Spit		Neringa and Klaipėda district, Klaipėda County, Lithuania* and Zelenogradsky District, Kaliningrad Oblast, Russia*; 55°16′28″N 20°57′45″E	Cultural: (v)	—	2000	Human habitation of this elongated sand dune peninsula, 98 km long and 0.4–4 km wide, dates back to prehistoric times. Throughout this period it has been threatened by the natural forces of wind and waves. Its survival to the present day has been made possible only as a result of ceaseless human efforts to combat the erosion of the Spit, dramatically illustrated by continuing stabilisation and reforestation projects.
Decorated Farmhouses of Hälsingland		Gävleborg, Sweden; 61°42′26″N 16°11′45″E	Cultural: (v)	14 (35); buffer zone 537 (1,330)	2012	Seven timber houses are listed in this site located in the east of Sweden, representing the zenith of a regional timber building tradition that dates back to the Middle Ages. They reflect the prosperity of independent farmers who in the 19th century used their wealth to build substantial new homes with elaborately decorated ancillary houses or suites of rooms reserved for festivities. The paintings represent a fusion of folk art with the styles favored by the landed gentry of the time, including Baroque and Rococo. Decorated by painters, including known and unknown itinerant artists, the listed properties represent the final flowering of a long cultural tradition.
Engelsberg Ironworks		Västmanland, Sweden; 59°58′00″N 16°00′30″E	Cultural: (iv)	—	1993	Sweden's production of superior grades of iron made it a leader in this field in the 17th and 18th centuries. This site is the best-preserved and most complete example of this type of Swedish ironworks.
Fortress of Suomenlinna		Helsinki, Finland; 60°8′50″N 24°59′14″E	Cultural: (iv)	—	1991	Built in the second half of the 18th century by Sweden on a group of islands located at the entrance of Helsinki's harbour, this fortress is an especially interesting example of European military architecture of the time.
Hanseatic Town of Visby		Gotland, Sweden; 57°38′30″N 18°17′45″E	Cultural: (iv), (v)	—	1995	A former Viking site on the island of Gotland, Visby was the main centre of the Hanseatic League in the Baltic from the 12th to the 14th century. Its 13th-century ramparts and more than 200 warehouses and wealthy merchants' dwellings from the same period make it the best-preserved fortified commercial city in northern Europe.
High Coast / Kvarken Archipelago		Västernorrland, Sweden* and Finland*; 63°18′00″N 21°18′00″E	Natural: (viii)	194,400 (480,000)	2000 (Note: Extended in 2006 to include the Kvarken Archipelago and name change from High Coast to the present name.)	The Kvarken Archipelago (Finland) and the High Coast (Sweden) are situated in the Gulf of Bothnia, a northern extension of the Baltic Sea. The 5,600 islands of the Kvarken Archipelago feature unusual ridged washboard moraines, ‘De Geer moraines’, formed by the melting of the continental ice sheet, 10,000 to 24,000 years ago. The Archipelago is continuously rising from the sea in a process of rapid glacio-isostatic uplift, whereby the land, previously weighed down under the weight of a glacier, lifts at rates that are among the highest in the world. As a consequence islands appear and unite, peninsulas expand, and lakes evolve from bays and develop into marshes and peat fens. The High Coast has also been largely shaped by the combined processes of glaciation, glacial retreat and the emergence of new land from the sea. Since the last retreat of the ice from the High Coast 9,600 years ago, the uplift has been in the order of 285 m which is the highest known ''rebound''. The site affords outstanding opportunities for the understanding of the important processes that formed the glaciated and land uplift areas of the Earth's surface.
Historic Centre of Riga		Riga, Latvia; 56°57′15″N 24°07′00″E	Cultural: (i), (ii)	438 (1,080); buffer zone 1,574 (3,890)	1997	Riga was a major centre of the Hanseatic League, deriving its prosperity in the 13th–15th centuries from the trade with central and eastern Europe. The urban fabric of its medieval centre reflects this prosperity, though most of the earliest buildings were destroyed by fire or war. Riga became an important economic centre in the 19th century, when the suburbs surrounding the medieval town were laid out, first with imposing wooden buildings in neoclassical style and then in Jugendstil . It is generally recognized that Riga has the finest collection of art nouveau buildings in Europe.
Historic Centre (Old Town) of Tallinn		Tallinn, Harju County, Estonia; 59°26′00″N 24°44′00″E	Cultural: (ii), (iv)	113 (280); buffer zone 2,253 (5,570)	1997 (Note: Minor modification of boundaries in 2008.)	The origins of Tallinn date back to the 13th century, when a castle was built there by the crusading knights of the Teutonic Order. It developed as a major centre of the Hanseatic League, and its wealth is demonstrated by the opulence of the public buildings (the churches in particular) and the domestic architecture of the merchants' houses, which have survived to a remarkable degree despite the ravages of fire and war in the intervening centuries.
Jelling Mounds, Runic Stones and Church		Jelling, Vejle Municipality, Southern Denmark, Denmark; 55°45′23″N 9°25′12″E	Cultural: (iii)	4.96 (12.3)	1994	The Jelling burial mounds and one of the runic stones are striking examples of pagan Nordic culture, while the other runic stone and the church illustrate the Christianization of the Danish people towards the middle of the 10th century.
Kernavė Archaeological Site (Cultural Reserve of Kernavė)		Kernavė, Širvintos district, Vilnius County, Lithuania; 54°53′16″N 24°49′50″E	Cultural: (iii), (iv)	194 (480); buffer zone 2,455 (6,070)	2004	The Kernavė Archaeological site, about 35 km north-west of Vilnius in eastern Lithuania, represents an exceptional testimony to some 10 millennia of human settlements in this region. Situated in the valley of the River Neris, the site is a complex ensemble of archaeological properties, encompassing the town of Kernavė, forts, some unfortified settlements, burial sites and other archaeological, historical and cultural monuments from the late Palaeolithic Period to the Middle Ages. The site of 194,4 ha has preserved the traces of ancient land-use, as well as remains of five impressive hill forts, part of an exceptionally large defence system. Kernavė was an important feudal town in the Middle Ages. The town was destroyed by the Teutonic Order in the late 14th century, however the site remained in use until modern times.
Kronborg Castle		Helsingør, Capital Region, Zealand, Denmark; 56°2′20″N 12°37′15″E	Cultural: (iv)	—	2000	Located on a strategically important site commanding the Sund, the stretch of water between Denmark and Sweden, the Royal castle of Kronborg at Helsingør (Elsinore) is of immense symbolic value to the Danish people and played a key role in the history of northern Europe in the 16th-18th centuries. Work began on the construction of this outstanding Renaissance castle in 1574, and its defences were reinforced according to the canons of the period's military architecture in the late 17th century. It has remained intact to the present day. It is world-renowned as Elsinore, the setting of Shakespeare's Hamlet.
Laponian Area		Norrbotten, Sweden; 67°20′00″N 17°35′00″E	Mixed: (iii), (v), (vii), (viii), (ix)	940,000 (2,300,000)	1996	The Arctic Circle region of northern Sweden is the home of the Saami, or Lapp people. It is the largest area in the world (and one of the last) with an ancestral way of life based on the seasonal movement of livestock. Every summer, the Saami lead their huge herds of reindeer towards the mountains through a natural landscape hitherto preserved, but now threatened by the advent of motor vehicles. Historical and ongoing geological processes can be seen in the glacial moraines and changing water courses.
Mining Area of the Great Copper Mountain in Falun		Dalarna, Sweden; 60°36′17″N 15°37′51″E	Cultural: (ii), (iii), (v)	43 (110); buffer zone 3,500 (8,600)	2001	The enormous mining excavation known as the Great Pit at Falun is the most striking feature of a landscape that illustrates the activity of copper production in this region since at least the 13th century. The 17th-century planned town of Falun with its many fine historic buildings, together with the industrial and domestic remains of a number of settlements spread over a wide area of the Dalarna region, provide a vivid picture of what was for centuries one of the world's most important mining areas.
Modernist Kaunas: Architecture of Optimism, 1919-1939		Kaunas, Kaunas County, Lithuania; 54°53′49″N 23°55′45″E	Cultural: (iv)	455 (1,120); buffer zone 404 (1,000)	2023	This property testifies to the rapid urbanization that transformed the provincial town of Kaunas into a modern city that became Lithuania’s provisional capital between the First and Second World Wars. Its community-driven transformation of an urban landscape was adapted from an earlier town layout. The quality of modern Kaunas was manifested through the spatial organization of the Naujamiestis (New Town) and Žaliakalnis (Green Hill) areas, and in public buildings, urban spaces and residences constructed during the interwar period that demonstrate a variety of styles in which the Modern Movement found architectural expression in the city.
Møns Klint		Zealand, Denmark; 54°57′51″N 12°33′08″E	Natural: (viii)	4,123 (10,190); buffer zone 3,628 (8,960)	2025	Featuring a dramatic glaciotectonic landscape shaped by Pleistocene glaciers, the property includes chalk cliffs, rolling hills, kame and kettle topography, and outwash plains. Visible cliff cross-sections reveal intense folding and faulting of Cretaceous chalk and Quaternary sediments. The area supports rare habitats like calcareous grasslands and beech forests, hosting diverse flora and fauna, including 18 species of orchid, and the almost-threatened Large Blue butterfly. Erosion continuously exposes fossils and reshapes the cliffs.
Naval Port of Karlskrona		Blekinge, Sweden; 56°10′00″N 15°35′00″E	Cultural: (ii), (iv)	—	1998	Karlskrona is an outstanding example of a late-17th-century European planned naval city. The original plan and many of the buildings have survived intact, along with installations that illustrate its subsequent development up to the present day.
Old Rauma		Rauma, Satakunta, Finland; 61°7′41″N 21°30′42″E	Cultural: (iv), (v)	29 (72); buffer zone 142 (350)	1991 (Note: Addition of the buffer zone in 2009 which had been established on a national level in 2003.)	Situated on the Gulf of Botnia, Rauma is one of the oldest harbours in Finland. Built around a Franciscan monastery, where the mid-15th-century Holy Cross Church still stands, it is an outstanding example of an old Nordic city constructed in wood. Although ravaged by fire in the late 17th century, it has preserved its ancient vernacular architectural heritage.
Old town of Kuldīga		Kuldīga Municipality, Latvia; 56°58′N 21°58′E	Cultural: (v)	84 (210); buffer zone 89 (220)	2023	Located in the western part of Latvia, the town of Kuldīga is an exceptionally well-preserved example of a traditional urban settlement, which developed from a small medieval hamlet into an important administrative centre of the Duchy of Courland and Semigallia between the 16th and 18th centuries. The town structure of Kuldīga has largely retained the street layout of that period, and includes traditional log architecture as well as foreign-influenced styles that illustrate the rich exchange between local and travelling craftspeople from around the Baltic Sea. The architectural influences and craftsmanship traditions introduced during the period of the Duchy endured well into the 19th century.
The par force hunting landscape in North Zealand		Capital Region, Zealand, Denmark; 55°54′49″N 12°21′28″E	Cultural: (ii), (iv)	—	2015	Located about 30 km northwest of Copenhagen, this cultural landscape encompasses the two hunting forests of Store Dyrehave and Gribskov, as well as the hunting park of Jægersborg Hegn/Jægersborg Dyrehave. This is a designed landscape where Danish kings and their court practiced par force hunting, or hunting with hounds, which reached its peak between the 17th and the late 18th centuries, when the absolute monarchs transformed it into a landscape of power. With hunting lanes laid out in a star system, combined with an orthogonal grid pattern, numbered stone posts, fences and a hunting lodge, the site demonstrates the application of Baroque landscaping principles to forested areas.
Petäjävesi Old Church		Petäjävesi, Central Finland, Finland; 62°15′00″N 25°11′00″E	Cultural: (iv)	—	1994	Petäjävesi Old Church, in central Finland, was built of logs between 1763 and 1765. This Lutheran country church is a typical example of an architectural tradition that is unique to eastern Scandinavia. It combines the Renaissance conception of a centrally planned church with older forms deriving from Gothic groin vaults.
Rjukan–Notodden Industrial Heritage Site		Notodden Municipality / Rjukan, Telemark, Norway; 59°52′43″N 8°35′37″E	Cultural: (ii), (iv)	—	2015	Located in a dramatic landscape of mountains, waterfalls and river valleys, the site comprises hydroelectric power plants, transmission lines, factories, transport systems and towns. The complex was established by the Norsk-Hydro Company to manufacture artificial fertilizer from nitrogen in the air. It was built to meet the Western world's growing demand for agricultural production in the early 20th century. The company towns of Rjukan and Notodden show workers’ accommodation and social institutions linked by rail and ferry to ports where the fertilizer was loaded. The Rjukan-Notodden site manifests an exceptional combination of industrial assets and themes associated to the natural landscape. It stands out as an example of a new global industry in the early 20th century.
Rock Art of Alta		Alta, Finnmark, Norway; 69°57′00″N 23°11′00″E	Cultural: (iii)	—	1985	This group of petroglyphs in the Alta Fjord, near the Arctic Circle, bears the traces of a settlement dating from c. 4200 to 500 B.C. The thousands of paintings and engravings add to our understanding of the environment and human activities on the fringes of the Far North in prehistoric times.
Rock Carvings in Tanum		Västra Götaland, Sweden; 58°42′04″N 11°20′28″E	Cultural: (i), (iii), (iv)	—	1994	The rock carvings in Tanum, in the north of Bohuslän, are a unique artistic achievement not only for their rich and varied motifs (depictions of humans and animals, weapons, boats and other subjects) but also for their cultural and chronological unity. They reveal the life and beliefs of people in Europe during the Bronze Age and are remarkable for their large numbers and outstanding quality.
Røros Mining Town and the Circumference		Røros, Trøndelag, Norway; 62°34′26″N 11°23′08″E	Cultural: (iii), (iv), (v)	—	1980 (Note: Extended in 2010 to include the circumference and name change from Røros Mining Town to the present name.)	Røros Mining Town and the Circumference is linked to the copper mines, established in the 17th century and exploited for 333 years until 1977. The site comprises the Town and its industrial-rural cultural landscapes; Femundshytta, a smelter with its associated area; and the Winter Transport Route. Completely rebuilt after its destruction by Swedish troops in 1679, Røros contains about 2000 wooden one- and two-storey houses and a smelting house. Many of these buildings have preserved their blackened wooden façades, giving the town a medieval appearance. Surrounded by a buffer zone, coincident with the area of privileges (the Circumference) granted to the mining enterprise by the Danish-Norwegian Crown (1646), the property illustrates the establishment and flourishing of a lasting culture based on copper mining in a remote region with a harsh climate.
Roskilde Cathedral		Roskilde, Region Zealand, Zealand, Denmark; 55°38′32″N 12°4′47″E	Cultural: (ii), (iv)	0.40 (0.99); buffer zone 1.50 (3.7)	1995	Built in the 12th and 13th centuries, this was Scandinavia's first Gothic cathedral to be built of brick and it encouraged the spread of this style throughout northern Europe. It has been the mausoleum of the Danish royal family since the 15th century. Porches and side chapels were added up to the end of the 19th century. Thus it provides a clear overview of the development of European religious architecture.
Royal Domain of Drottningholm		Stockholm, Sweden; 59°19′23″N 17°53′00″E	Cultural: (iv)	—	1991	The Royal Domain of Drottningholm stands on an island in Lake Mälar in a suburb of Stockholm. With its castle, perfectly preserved theatre (built in 1766), Chinese pavilion and gardens, it is the finest example of an 18th-century north European royal residence inspired by the Palace of Versailles.
Skogskyrkogården		Stockholm, Sweden; 59°16′32″N 18°05′58″E	Cultural: (ii), (iv)	—	1994	This Stockholm cemetery was created between 1917 and 1920 by two young architects, Asplund and Lewerentz, on the site of former gravel pits overgrown with pine trees. The design blends vegetation and architectural elements, taking advantage of irregularities in the site to create a landscape that is finely adapted to its function. It has had a profound influence in many countries of the world.
Stevns Klint	White cliffs topped with sparse grass partially encircle the blue ocean	Store Heddinge, Zealand, Denmark; 55°16′02″N 12°25′24″E	Natural: (viii)	50 (120); buffer zone 4,136 (10,220)	2014	Stevns Klint is a 15 km (9.3 mi) long fossil rich chalk cliff. The fossil record includes evidence of the ash cloud following the Chicxulub meteorite impact that is believed to have caused a mass extinction 65 million years ago. The site also includes evidence of the recovery after the extinction.
Struve Geodetic Arc		Belarus*, Estonia*, Finland*, Latvia*, Lithuania*, Moldova*, Norway*, Russia*, Sweden* and Ukraine*; 59°03′28″N 26°20′16″E	Cultural: (ii), (iii), (vi)	—	2005	The Struve Arc is a chain of survey triangulations stretching from Hammerfest in Norway to the Black Sea, through 10 countries and over 2,820 km. These are points of a survey, carried out between 1816 and 1855 by the astronomer Friedrich Georg Wilhelm Struve, which represented the first accurate measuring of a long segment of a meridian. This helped to establish the exact size and shape of the planet and marked an important step in the development of earth sciences and topographic mapping. It is an extraordinary example of scientific collaboration among scientists from different countries, and of collaboration between monarchs for a scientific cause. The original arc consisted of 258 main triangles with 265 main station points. The listed site includes 34 of the original station points, with different markings, i.e. a drilled hole in rock, iron cross, cairns, or built obelisks.
Surtsey		Vestmannaeyjar, Iceland; 63°18′11″N 20°36′08″W	Natural: (ix)	3,370 (8,300); buffer zone 3,190 (7,900)	2008	Surtsey, a volcanic island approximately 32 km from the south coast of Iceland, is a new island formed by volcanic eruptions that took place from 1963 to 1967. It is all the more outstanding for having been protected since its birth, providing the world with a pristine natural laboratory. Free from human interference, Surtsey has been producing unique long-term information on the colonisation process of new land by plant and animal life. Since they began studying the island in 1964, scientists have observed the arrival of seeds carried by ocean currents, the appearance of moulds, bacteria and fungi, followed in 1965 by the first vascular plant, of which there were 10 species by the end of the first decade. By 2004, they numbered 60 together with 75 bryophytes, 71 lichens and 24 fungi. Eighty-nine species of birds have been recorded on Surtsey, 57 of which breed elsewhere in Iceland. The 141 ha island is also home to 335 species of invertebrates.
Þingvellir National Park		Bláskógabyggð, Iceland; 64°15′14″N 21°2′14″W	Cultural: (iii), (vi)	9,270 (22,900)	2004	Þingvellir (Thingvellir) is the National Park where the Althing, an open-air assembly representing the whole of Iceland, was established in 930 and continued to meet until 1798. Over two weeks a year, the assembly set laws – seen as a covenant between free men – and settled disputes. The Althing has deep historical and symbolic associations for the people of Iceland. The property includes the Þingvellir National Park and the remains of the Althing itself: fragments of around 50 booths built from turf and stone. Remains from the 10th century are thought to be buried underground. The site also includes remains of agricultural use from the 18th and 19th centuries. The park shows evidence of the way the landscape was husbanded over 1,000 years.
Urnes Stave Church		Luster, Vestland, Norway; 61°18′00″N 7°20′00″E	Cultural: (i), (ii), (iii)	—	1979	The wooden church of Urnes (the stavkirke) stands in the natural setting of Sogn og Fjordane. It was built in the 12th and 13th centuries and is an outstanding example of traditional Scandinavian wooden architecture. It brings together traces of Celtic art, Viking traditions and Romanesque spatial structures.
Varberg Radio Station		Halland, Sweden; 57°06′00″N 12°23′00″E	Cultural: (ii), (iv)	109 (270); buffer zone 3,854 (9,520)	2004	The Varberg Radio Station at Grimeton in southern Sweden (built 1922–24) is an exceptionally well-preserved monument to early wireless transatlantic communication. It consists of the transmitter equipment, including the aerial system of six 127-m high steel towers. Although no longer in regular use, the equipment has been maintained in operating condition. The 109.9-ha site comprises buildings housing the original Alexanderson transmitter, including the towers with their antennae, short-wave transmitters with their antennae, and a residential area with staff housing. The architect Carl Åkerblad designed the main buildings in the neoclassical style and the structural engineer Henrik Kreüger was responsible for the antenna towers, the tallest built structures in Sweden at that time. The site is an outstanding example of the development of telecommunications and is the only surviving example of a major transmitting station based on pre-electronic technology.
Vatnajökull National Park — dynamic nature of fire and ice		Vatnajökull, Iceland; 64°30′0″N 17°0′0″W	Natural: (viii)	1,482,000 (3,660,000)	2019	
Vegaøyan — The Vega Archipelago		Vega, Nordland, Norway; 65°37′00″N 11°45′00″E	Cultural: (v)	103,710 (256,300); buffer zone 28,040 (69,300)	2004	A cluster of dozens of islands centred on Vega, just south of the Arctic Circle, forms a cultural landscape of 103,710 ha, of which 6,930 ha is land. The islands bear testimony to a distinctive frugal way of life based on fishing and the harvesting of the down of eider ducks, in an inhospitable environment. There are fishing villages, quays, warehouses, eider houses (built for eider ducks to nest in), farming landscapes, lighthouses and beacons. There is evidence of human settlement from the Stone Age onwards. By the 9th century, the islands had become an important centre for the supply of down, which appears to have accounted for around a third of the islanders’ income. The Vega Archipelago reflects the way fishermen/farmers have, over the past 1,500 years, maintained a sustainable living and the contribution of women to eiderdown harvesting.
Verla Groundwood and Board Mill		Kouvola (Jaala), Kymenlaakso, Finland; 61°3′43″N 26°38′27″E	Cultural: (iv)	23 (57); buffer zone 80 (200)	1996	The Verla groundwood and board mill and its associated residential area is an outstanding, remarkably well-preserved example of the small-scale rural industrial settlements associated with pulp, paper and board production that flourished in northern Europe and North America in the 19th and early 20th centuries. Only a handful of such settlements survive to the present day.
Viking-Age Ring fortresses		North Jutland, Southern Denmark and Zealand, Denmark; 56°59′43″N 9°15′17″E	Cultural: (iii)(iv)	51 (130); buffer zone 16,821 (41,570)	2023	These five archaeological sites comprise a system of monumental ring-shaped Viking-Age fortresses sharing a uniform geometric design. Constructed between about 970 and 980 CE, the fortresses at Aggersborg, Fyrkat, Nonnebakken, Trelleborg and Borgring were positioned strategically near important land and sea routes, and each made use of the natural topography of their surrounding landscape for defensive purposes. They are an emblematic demonstration of the centralized power of the Jelling Dynasty, and a testimony to the socio-political transformations that the Danish realm underwent in the late 10th century.
Vilnius Historic Centre		Vilnius, Lithuania; 54°41′12″N 25°17′35″E	Cultural: (ii), (iv)	—	1994	Political centre of the Grand Duchy of Lithuania from the 13th to the end of the 18th century, Vilnius has had a profound influence on the cultural and architectural development of much of eastern Europe. Despite invasions and partial destruction, it has preserved an impressive complex of Gothic, Renaissance, Baroque and classical buildings as well as its medieval layout and natural setting.
Wadden Sea	A map showing the coast of the Netherlands, Germany and Denmark. The land is green, the Wadden Sea is dark blue and the ocean is light blue.	Denmark*, Germany*, Netherlands*; 53°31′43″N 8°33′22″E	Natural: (viii), (ix), (x)	968,393 (2,392,950)	2009	The Wadden Sea contains the Dutch Wadden Sea Conservation Area and the German Wadden Sea National Parks of Lower Saxony, Schleswig-Holstein and Hamburg. The coast line is generally flat and has may mudflats, marshes and dunes. The site covers two-thirds of the entire Wadden Sea and is home to many plant and animal species. It is a breeding ground for up to 12 million birds annually and supports more than 10 percent of the population of 29 species. The site was expanded in 2014 to include the Danish part of the Wadden Sea.
West Norwegian Fjords — Geirangerfjord and Nærøyfjord		Møre og Romsdal, Norway; 62°7′00″N 7°10′00″E	Natural: (vii), (viii)	—	2005	Situated in south-western Norway, north-east of Bergen, Geirangerfjord and Nærøyfjord, set 120 km from one another, are part of the west Norwegian fjord landscape, which stretches from Stavanger in the south to Andalsnes, 500 km to the north-east. The two fjords, among the world's longest and deepest, are considered as archetypical fjord landscapes and among the most scenically outstanding anywhere. Their exceptional natural beauty is derived from their narrow and steep-sided crystalline rock walls that rise up to 1,400 m from the Norwegian Sea and extend 500 m below sea level. The sheer walls of the fjords have numerous waterfalls while free-flowing rivers cross their deciduous and coniferous forests to glacial lakes, glaciers and rugged mountains. The landscape features a range of supporting natural phenomena, both terrestrial and marine, such as submarine moraines and marine mammals.

== Tentative list ==
Denmark (7)

- Amalienborg and its district (1993)
- Moler landscape of Limfjord (2010)
- The Maritime Heritage of Dragør Old Town and Harbour - A ‘skipper-town’ from the era of the great tall ships in the 18th and 19th centuries (2019)

Estonia (3)

- Kuressaare Fortress (2002)
- Baltic Klint (2004)
- Wooded meadows (Laelatu, Kalli-Nedrema, Mäepea, Allika, Tagamoisa, Loode, Koiva, Halliste) (2004)

Finland (7)

- The Carvings from historic time at the island of Gaddtarmen (Hauensuoli) (1990)
- The large Stone Age ruin of Kastelli at Pattijoki (1990)
- The rock paintings of Astuvansalmi at Ristiina (1990)
- The Holy place of worship of Ukonsaari by the Sami people at Inari (1990)
- Paimio Hospital (formerly Paimio Sanatorium) (2004)
- Saimaa-Pielinen Lake System (2004)

Iceland (7)

- Breiðafjörður Nature Reserve (2011)
- Mývatn and Laxá (2011)
- Viking monuments and sites/Þingvellir National Park (2011)
- Þingvellir National Park (2011)
- The Turf House Tradition (2011)
- Torfajökull Volcanic System/Fjallabak Nature Reserve (2013)

Latvia (3)

- Viking Monuments and Sites/Grobiņa archaeological complex (2011)
- Kuldīga Old Town in the Primeval Valley of the River Venta (2011)
- Meanders of the Upper Daugava (2011)

Lithuania (2)

- Trakai Historical National Park (2003)

Norway (5)

- The Laponian area – Tysfjorden, the fjord of Hellenbotn and Rago (extension) (2002)
- The Lofoten Islands (2007)
- Svalbard Archipelago (2007)
- Islands of Jan Mayen og Bouvet as part of a serial transnational nomination of the Mid-Atlantic Ridge System (2007)
- Viking Monuments and Sites/Vestfold Ship Burials and Hyllestad Quernstone Quarries (2011)

Sweden (1)

- The Rise of Systematic Biology (2009)
