= André d'Arbelles =

French journalist (1767–1825)

- Born: Claude François André; 21 April 1767; Montluel
- Died: 28 September 1825 (aged 58); Le Mans
- Occupations: Journalist; Historiographer

André d'Arbelles, (21 April 1767 – 28 September 1825) was a French journalist and high-ranking official.

== Biography ==
The brother of Claude André, bishop of Quimper, he studied in Lyon and soon moved to Paris where he was Secretary of count Stanislas de Clermont-Tonnerre.

=== French Revolution ===
Another of his brothers, a notary in Lyon, having been compromised by papers found in the king's apartments after the 10 August 1792, was decreed arrested by the National Convention on December 2 of that year. He first escaped the pursuit of his enemies; but having been taken after the revolt of Lyon against the National Convention, he was brought to the revolutionary committee established in this city, sentenced to death and executed in January 1794; he was 41 years old, and also born in Montluel.

André emigrated in 1792, and having no other resources, he entered as a mere cavalier in the Armée des Émigrés, where he was known under the name M. de Montluel (from the name of the town where he was born), made the campaign of that year 1792, then in the Austrian regiment of the "Dragons de Latour", with which he made several campaigns.

Returning to Paris in 1798, he was employed in various literary and political works by Talleyrand, the Foreign Minister, and participated in the writing of the Messager du Soir, where he had Isidore Langlois as collaborator, and to that of the Argus, an English newspaper which was printed in Paris, for which Bertrand Barère de Vieuzac and Goldsmitz also worked, at the expense of the ministry.

The author of Mémoires d'un homme d'État refers to him as one of the agents who, with MM. de Montrond and de Sainte-Foy, asked the envoys of America, from Talleyrand, a sum of money for a successful negotiation.

André long worked in the composition of different circumstances brochures, which were published without the author's name, and sometimes even without a printer name.

=== French Empire ===
Appointed historiographer of the Ministry of Foreign Affairs in 1808, he was charged in that capacity to publish various writings, which aimed to advocate the policy of Napoleon. It was about this time that he changed once again his name for d'Arbelles.

=== Bourbon Restauration ===
In 1814 he took a large part in the Bourbons First Restoration and for that, seconded of all his ways Talleyrand who had him receive the Legion d'honneur, and destined him to greater favors when Napoleon's return changed so many projects.

André d'Arbelles refused to swear allegiance and lost his job; but immediately after the second return of Louis XVIII, he was appointed Prefect of Mayenne on 17 July 1815 and in August Master of Requests at the Conseil d'État in extraordinary service. It was then that he openly took the title of "Marquis d'Arbelle" which he abandoned a little later.

After the royal decree of September 5, 1815, so fatal to the royalist party, André d'Arbelles was dismissed from his prefecture in 1817 as too royalist. Reinstated in his prefectural office in January 1823, he was then called to the Prefecture de la Sarthe.

It is in these functions that he died in Le Mans by accident of which Aimé Marie Gaspard de Clermont-Tonnerre was unwittingly the cause. This minister having gone to Le Mans to conduct an inspection, the prefect hastened to meet him; but when he approached the ministerial cortege he was trampled by a runaway horse. He died a few hours after the accident, much regretted by the whole department he administered.

== Publications ==
(all his publications were anonymous)

- 1806: Précis des causes et des événemens qui ont amené le démembrement de la Pologne, formant l'introduction des Mémoires sur la révolution de Pologne, par le quartier-maitre général de Pirlton, trouves à Berlin, Paris, Imprimerie impériale, in-8°;
- 1807: Réponse au Manifeste du roi de Prusse, 15 November, in-8°.

It is known that this manifest was composed by Friedrich von Gentz;

- 1807: De la Politique et des progrès de la Puissance russe, in-8°.

This publication, directed against Russia, was withdrawn from circulation after the announcement of the Treaty of Tilsitt;

- 1809: Que veut l'Autriche ?, Imprimerie impériale, in-8°.

The same thing happened to this work after the Treaty of Schönbrunn, that what happened to the previous one after the Treaty of Tilsitt;

- 1810: Tableau historique et politique de la Cour de Rome, depuis l'origine de sa puissance temporelle jusqu'à nos jours; in-8°.

The author had the weakness to write this book in opposition to his own principles, to obey the orders of the imperial government. This book was published when Napoleon took possession of the Papal States and was driving the Pope prisoner to France. It was a justification for these acts: it would have found more readers, if at the same time wouldn't have appeared the historical essay devoted to the Puissance temporelle des Papes by Pierre Claude François Daunou;

- 1810: Mémoire sur la conduite de la France et de l'Angleterre à l'égard des neutres; imprimerie impériale, in-8°.

According to new information, says the author of the Dictionnaire des Anonymes, it seems that these various books were written by Mr. Lesur; but some of the information does not allow us to doubt that Andre d'Arbelles composed a great many deal of them.

== Bibliography ==
- de Beauchamp, Alphonse; Giraud, Pierre François Félix Joseph; Michaud, Joseph Fr.; de Coiffier de Moret, Henri Louis (1807). Biographie modern;ou Dictionnaire biographique, de tous les hommes morts et vivans qui ont marqué à la fin du XVIII et au commencement de celui-ci, par leurs écrits, leur rang, leurs emplois, leurs talens, leurs malheurs, leurs vertus, leurs crimes, et où tous les faits qui les concernent sont rapportés de la manière la plus impartiale et la plus authentique. P.-J. Besson.;
- de Beauchamp, Alphonse; Psaume, Étienne (1816). Biographie moderne, ou, Galerie historique, civile, militaire, politique, littéraire et judiciaire;contenant les portraits politiques de Français de l'un et de l'autre sexe, morts ou vivans, qui se sont rendus plus ou moins célèbres, depuis le commencement de la révolution jusqu'à nos jours, par leurs talens, leurs emplois, leurs malheurs, leur courage, leurs vertus ou leurs crimes. Vol. 1. A. Eymery.;
- Depéry, Jean-Irénée (1835). Biographie des hommes célèbres du département de l'Ain;qui se sont distingués par leurs sciences, leurs talens, leurs actions, leurs vertus ou leurs vices. Vol. 1 à 2. Bottier.;
- Feller, François-Xavier (1847). Biographie universelle;Dictionnaire historique des hommes qui se sont fait un nom. Vol. 1. J. Leroux.;
- Dictionnaire de biographies française, Librairie Letouzey et Ané, 1936, tome II, p. 946.
- Les Préfets du 11 ventôse an VIII au 4 septembre 1870, Archives nationales, 1981.

=== External links ===
- André d’Arbelles notice biographique on media 19
