= List of archaeoastronomical sites by country =

This is a list of sites where claims for the use of archaeoastronomy have been made, sorted by country.

The International Council on Monuments and Sites (ICOMOS) and the International Astronomical Union (IAU) jointly published a thematic study on heritage sites of astronomy and archaeoastronomy to be used as a guide to UNESCO in its evaluation of the cultural importance of archaeoastronomical sites around the world, which discussed sample sites and provided categories for the classification of archaeoastronomical sites. The editors, Clive Ruggles and Michel Cotte, proposed that archaeoastronomical sites be considered in four categories: 1) Generally accepted; 2) Debated among specialists; 3) Unproven; and 4) Completely refuted.

== Armenia ==
- Godedzor
- Zorats Karer (aka Carahunge), archeological site claimed to have astronomical significance although this is disputed. it is often referred to in international tourist lore as the "Armenian Stonehenge".

== Australia ==
- Ngaut Ngaut oral tradition says these engravings represent lunar cycles.
- Wurdi Youang, a stone arrangement with possible solar alignments
- Stone structures at Lake Tyers traditionally used as an observatory

== Brazil ==
- Parque Arqueológico do Solstício (called "Amazon Stonehenge"): An archaeological park located in Amapá state, Brazil, near the city of Calçoene. Archaeologists believe that this site was built by indigenous peoples for astronomical, ceremonial, or burial purposes, and likely a combination.

== Bulgaria ==
- Magura Cave, Bronze Age "paintings of staggered black and white squares could have been used to count the days in a calendar month", possibly indicating the number of days in the solar tropical year.

== Cambodia ==
- Angkor Wat
- Phnom Bakheng, According to Jean Filliozat of the École Française, the center tower represents the axis of the world and the 108 smaller ones represent the 4 lunar phases each with 27 days.

== Canada ==
- Petroforms of North America are shapes and patterns made by lining up large rocks on the open ground made by various Native American, First Nation, and Inuit peoples in North America. They are believed to have been made as astronomical calendars.
- Medicine Wheel

== Colombia ==
- El Infiernito, (Spanish for "Little hell"), is a pre-Columbian Muisca site located in the outskirts of Villa de Leyva, Boyacá Department, Colombia. It is composed of several earthworks surrounding a setting of menhirs (upright standing stones); several burial mounds are also present. The site was a center of religious ceremonies and spiritual purification rites, and also served as a rudimentary astronomical observatory.

== China ==
- Puyang tomb, dated from 5000 BP, depicts a mosaic of constellations.
- The Taosi Observatory: An astronomical observatory which is the oldest in East Asia, located in Xiangfen County, Shanxi, China.

== Egypt ==
- Abu Simbel, The axis of the temple was positioned by the ancient Egyptian architects in such a way that twice a year, on October 20 and February 20, the rays of the sun would penetrate the sanctuary and illuminate the sculpture on the back wall, except for the statue of Ptah, the god connected with the Underworld, who always remained in the dark.
- Buto temple at the El-Faraeen archaeological site, sixth century BC, discovered October 2024.
- Nabta Playa is an archaeological site in southern Egypt, containing what may be among the world's earliest known archeoastronomical devices from the 5th millennium BC. These include alignments of stones that may have indicated the rising of certain stars and a "calendar circle" that indicates the approximate direction of summer solstice sunrise.
- Precinct of Amun-Re

== Finland ==
- The so-called Giants' Churches (Finn. jätinkirkko), which are large, from c. 20 metres (66 ft) to over 70 metres (230 ft) long rectangular or oval stone enclosures built in the Neolithic (c. 3000–1800 BC), have axis and doorway orientations towards the sunrises and sunsets of the solstices and other calendrically significant days. For example, the Kastelli of Raahe, which is one of the largest Giants' Churches, had its five "gates", i.e. wall openings, oriented towards the midsummer sunset, the winter solstice sunrise, winter solstice sunset, the sunrises of the mid-quarter days of early May (Walpurgis, Beltaine) and August (Lammas), as well as the sunrise 11 days before the vernal equinox in 2500 BC.

== France ==
- Belchen system
- Carnac stones

== Germany ==
- Belchen system
- Goseck circle
- Glauberg
- Magdalenenberg (disputed)
- The Pömmelte Circle Shrine

== Guatemala ==
- Tikal
- Uaxactun

== Honduras ==
- Copán Ruinas
- El Puente

== Indonesia ==
- Borobudur
- Prambanan

== India ==
For a full list see the chapter on India in the ICOMOS book edited by Clive Ruggles and Michel Cotte. These sites include:

- Brahmagiri
- Hanamsagar
- Udayagiri
- Sun temples of Varanasi
- Vijayanagar
- Jantar Mantar
- Gyarah Sidi
- Burzahom archaeological site
- Lonar Lake
- Stone circles of Junapani
- Kalaiyarkoil Tamilnadu

J.M. Malville and Rana P.B. Singh have done much work on the archaeoastronomy of sacred sites in India.

== Iran ==
- Persepolis
- Naqsh-e Rustam

== Ireland ==
- Newgrange, once a year, at the winter solstice, the rising sun shines directly along the long passage into the chamber for about 17 minutes and illuminates the chamber floor. (Generally accepted). It was built during the Neolithic period, around 3200 BC, making it older than Stonehenge and the Egyptian pyramids.
- Knowth is a Neolithic passage grave and ancient monument estimated to date from c. 3200 BC.
- Dowth in Boyne Valley, County Meath is a Neolithic passage tomb date with Astronomical alignments from between approximately 3200 and 2900 BC.
- Loughcrew near Oldcastle, County Meath is a group of megalithic tombs dating back to the 4th millennium BC, designed to receive the beams of the rising sun on the spring and autumnal equinox - the light shining down the passage and illuminating the art on the backstone.
- Carrowkeel
- Mound of the Hostages
- Drombeg stone circle, at the winter solstice, the sun sets into a v formed by two distant overlapping hills and makes an alignment with the altar stone and the two main uprights. Due to the nature of the site and the western hills, local mid-winter sunset is c. 15:50.
- Beltany stone circle
- Beaghmore Stone Circles, a complex of early Bronze Age megalithic features, stone circles and cairns. Some archaeologists believe that the circles have been constructed in relation to the rising of the sun at the solstice, or to record the movements of the sun and moon acting as observatories for particular lunar, solar or stellar events. Three of the stone rows point to the sunrise at the time of the solstice and another is aligned towards moonrise at the same period.
- Boheh Stone, believed to have been aligned to the sun's path along the mountain of Croagh Patrick

== Italy ==
- Alatri
- Nuraghe
- Obelisk of Montecitorio - Its shadow was projected on a meridian (now under the modern floor) which indicated zodiacal constellations during the year.
- Pantheon - The entrance of the Pantheon is aligned so that on 21st April every year it is illuminated by the Sun.
- Pisa Cathedral - The light of the Sun entered through a window at the Spring Equinox, illuminating a specific point near the altar. Now the window is closed but the light enters through a tiny window near the ceiling. The Tower of Pisa itself is a Gnomon and there is the possibility that Tower-Cathedral-Baptistery are aligned forming the shape of the constellation Aries.

== Kenya ==
- Namoratunga

== Korea ==
- Cheomseongdae, ancient observatory in Gyeongju, Republic of Korea, from the 7th century.

== Malta ==
- Megalithic Temples of Malta
  - Mnajdra
  - Tal-Qadi Temple

== Mexico ==
- Calakmul
- Cantona
- Cañada de la Virgen
- Casas Grandes
- Chichen Itza
  - The Caracol is theorized to be a proto-observatory with doors and windows aligned to astronomical events, specifically around the path of Venus as it traverses the heavens. (Debated among specialists).
  - The main pyramid El Castillo (the Temple of Kukulkan) displays the appearance of a snake "crawling" down the pyramid at the spring equinox (Unproven).
- Coba
- Dzibilchaltun, Spring equinox, the sun rises so that it shines directly through one window of the temple and out the other.
- Ikil, Hierophany where the sunrise on the day of the solar zenith transit aligns with the summit of Ikil Structure 1 as viewed from an observation point within Ikil Cave 1.
- Izamal
- Mitla
- Monte Albán, zenith tube
- Palenque
- La Quemada
- El Tajín
- Teotihuacan, the pecked-cross circles as survey-markers
- Tulum
- Uxmal, Venus alignment of the "Governor's Palace"
- Xochicalco, zenith tube
- Yagul

== Nepal ==
- Ajaymerukot
- Ayodhyapuri
- Bhurti Temple Complex
- Gotihawa
- Lumbini pillar inscription
- Nigali Sagar
- Ramagrama stupa
- Tilaurakot

== Netherlands ==
- Funnel Beaker Culture megalith graves ("hunebedden") in the eastern Netherlands might be oriented on moonrises.

== North Macedonia ==
- Kokino Situated 1030 m above sea level on the Tatićev Kamen Summit near Kumanovo.(disputed)

== Palestine ==
Tell es-Sultan also known as Tel Jericho, is the site of ancient and biblical Jericho and today a UNESCO-nominated archaeological site in the West Bank.

== Pakistan ==
- Lahore Fort
- Mohenjo Daro
- Taxila
- Harrapa
- Makli Graveyard

== Peru ==
- Buena Vista
- Chankillo
- Cusco
- Machu Picchu
- Nazca Lines
- Choquequirao
- Ollantaytambo

== Portugal ==
- Almendres Cromlech
- Anta Grande do Zambujeiro
- Dolmen of Cunha Baixa

== Romania ==
- Sarmizegetusa Regia

== Russia ==
- Arkaim

== Saudi Arabia ==
- Kaaba, has its corners and walls aligned or oriented towards risings and settings of celestial objects.

== Spain ==
- Antequera Dolmens Site
  - Peña de los Enamorados
  - Dolmen of Menga

== Syria ==
- Rujm el-Hiri is an ancient megalithic monument consisting of concentric circles of stone with a tumulus at center, in the Golan Heights, territory occupied by Israel. It is believed that the site was used as an ancient calendar. At the times of the two equinoxes, the sun's rays would pass between two rocks, at the eastern edge of the compound. The entrance to the center opens on sunrise of the summer solstice. Other notches in the walls indicate the spring and fall equinoxes. It is also believed the site was used for astronomical observations of the constellations, probably for religious calculations. Researchers found the site was built with dimensions and scales common for other period structures, and partly based on the stars' positions.

== Sweden ==
- Ale's Stones

== Switzerland ==
- Belchen system
- Columna Jovis

== Turkey ==
- Göbekli Tepe

== United Kingdom ==
- Avebury
- Ballochroy
- Boscawen-Un winter solstice sunrise out of the Lamorna Gap
- Bryn Celli Ddu – aligned with the summer solstice such that light illuminates a quartz rich stone at the back of the chamber
- Bulford solar alignment
- Callanish Stones
- Durrington Walls
- Maeshowe, it is aligned so that the rear wall of its central chamber, a rough cube of five yards square held up by a bracketed wall, is illuminated on the winter solstice.
- Prehistoric Orkney
- St Edward the Confessor's Church, Leek. Traditional site for observing a double sunset.
- Stonehenge (Generally accepted).
- Woodhenge

== United States ==
- America's Stonehenge in New Hampshire
- Anderson Mounds, Anderson, Indiana.
- Bighorn Medicine Wheel
- Cahokia, large Mississippian culture site with numerous solar and other alignments
  - Cahokia Woodhenge, equinox and summer solstice sunrise/winter solstice sunset aligned timber circle
  - Mound 72, summer solstice sunrise/winter solstice sunset aligned burial mound
- Casa Malpaís Archaeological Site, Springerville, Arizona. Summer solstice at noon and sunset.
- Chaco Canyon, cardinal orientations, meridian alignment, inter-pueblo alignments
  - The 3-Slab Site atop Fajada Butte in Chaco Canyon, which marks the solstices.
- Chimney Rock Archaeological Area, near Pagosa Springs, Colorado
- Crack Cave at Picture Canyon (Colorado) in Comanche National Grassland
- Emerald Mound and Village Site, Lebanon, Illinois
- Haleets on Bainbridge Island in Washington state
- Hovenweep Castle
- Holly Solstice Panel in Hovenweep National Monument
- Moorehead Circle, timber circle in Ohio
- Octagon Earthworks
- Serpent Mound
- Skystone near Naches Trail in Washington state
- Wally's Dome in Sacramento Mountains (New Mexico)

== See also ==
- List of colossal sculpture in situ
- List of Egyptian pyramids
- List of megalithic sites
- List of menhirs
- List of Mesoamerican pyramids
- List of Roman bridges
- List of Roman domes
- List of statues
- List of tallest statues
- List of tallest statues in the United States
- List of world's largest domes
- New Seven Wonders of the World
