= Montluel =

Commune in Auvergne-Rhône-Alpes, France

- Commune
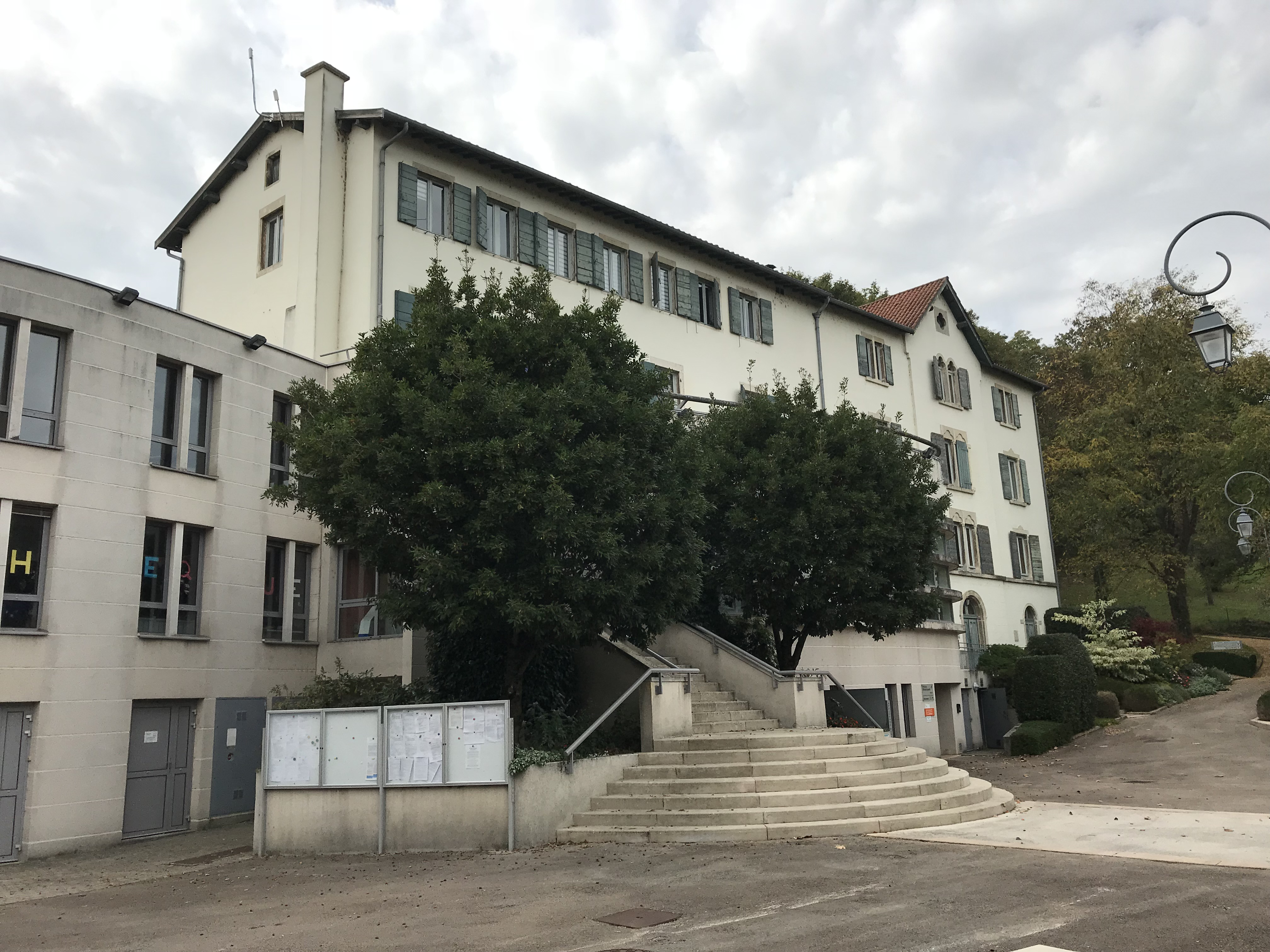
- Town hall

- Coat of arms
- Location of Montluel
- Location within France Location within Auvergne-Rhône-Alpes
- Coordinates: 45°51′00″N 5°03′18″E
- Country: France
- Region: Auvergne-Rhône-Alpes
- Department: Ain
- Arrondissement: Bourg-en-Bresse
- Canton: Meximieux
- Intercommunality: La Côtière à Montluel

Government
  - Mayor (2026–32): Philippe Belair
- Area^{1}: 40.11 km^{2} (15.49 sq mi)
- Elevation: 199 m (653 ft)
- Highest elevation: 312 m (1,024 ft)
- Lowest elevation: 192 m (630 ft)
- Population (2023): 6,895
  - Density: 171.9/km^{2} (445.2/sq mi)
- Time zone: UTC+01:00 (CET)
  - Summer (DST): UTC+02:00 (CEST)
- INSEE/Postal code: 01262 /01120
- ^{1} French Land Register data, which excludes lakes, ponds, glaciers > 1 km^{2} (0.386 sq mi or 247 acres) and river estuaries.

Montluel (French pronunciation: [mɔ̃lɥɛl]; Arpitan: Montluèl) is a commune in the Ain department in eastern France.

It is situated on the outskirts of Lyon. The inhabitants are known as Montluistes.

== Population ==
Historical population
Year	Pop.	±% p.a.
1968	3,528	—
1975	4,604	+3.88%
1982	5,450	+2.44%
1990	5,954	+1.11%
1999	6,454	+0.90%
2007	6,635	+0.35%
2012	7,112	+1.40%
2017	6,964	−0.42%
2023	6,895	−0.17%
Source: INSEE

== Personalities ==
- Claude André (1743-1818), Catholic Bishop of Quimper
- André d'Arbelles (1767–1825), younger brother of the above, journalist and historiographer
- Pierre-Dominique Ségaud (1784–1821), writer and lawyer
- Joseph Crétin (1799-1857), Catholic Bishop of Saint Paul, Minnesota
- Paul Magaud (1805-?), botanist
- Jules Gros (1829–1891), journalist and President of the unrecognised Republic of Independent Guyana.
- Pierre Cormorèche (1924–1999), politician

== See also ==
- Communes of the Ain department
