= Parque Arqueológico do Solstício =

Archaeological park in Brazil

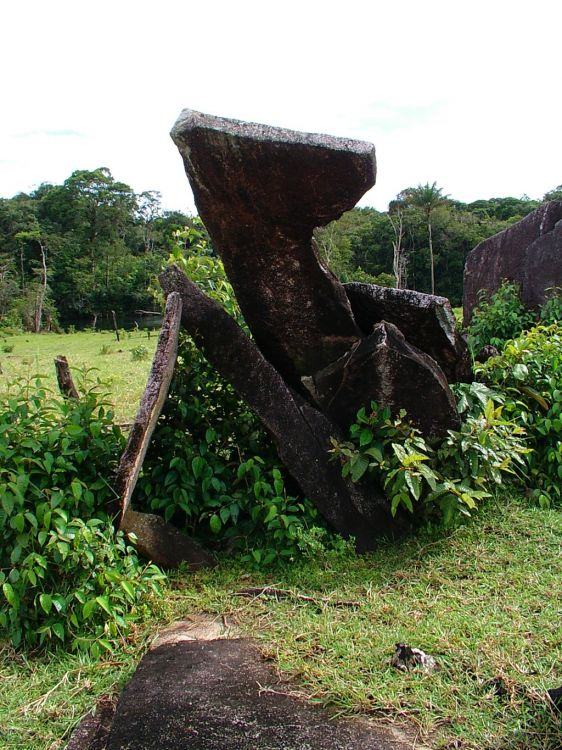
- The Amazon Stonehenge is located north of Calçoene, 390 kilometres (240 mi) from Macapá

- Location within Brazil Location within Amapá
- Type: Archaeological site
- Location: Calçoene, Amapá, Brazil
- Coordinates: 2°37′13″N 51°00′44″W

The Parque Arqueológico do Solstício (Solstice Archaeological Park), referred to in academic sources as AP-CA-18, is an archaeological park located in Amapá state, Brazil, near the city of Calçoene. It contains a megalithic stone circle, colloquially known as the Amazon Stonehenge, consisting of 127 blocks of granite, each up to 4 meters tall, standing upright in a circle measuring over 30 meters in diameter at the bank of the Rego Grande river on a hilltop. Archaeologists believe that this site was built by indigenous peoples for astronomical, ceremonial, or burial purposes, and likely a combination. The function of this megalithic site is unknown, much like other sites such as Stonehenge, a much older site in Great Britain.

== Discovery ==
The first reports of the Rego Grande site are from naturalist Emilio Goeldi in the late 19th century. Locals have called the site "Tropical Stonehenge" for some time. In 2005, archaeologists began excavation of the site after it was reported by a geologist during a socioeconomic study.

== Findings ==
Though the stones have not been submitted to dating techniques, carbon-dating of pottery sherds has placed the site at 500 – 2000 years old. The origin of these granite blocks has yet to be studied as well. In certain Megalithic sites, such as Stonehenge in Wiltshire, England, the blocks were moved to the site from some distance away. Archaeologists are not yet sure whether the Rego Grande site were also brought from elsewhere.

On the winter solstice of December 21, the shortest day of the year in the northern hemisphere, the shadow of one of the blocks disappears when the sun is directly above it. The rock seems to be placed at angle so that the shadow is possibly small throughout the day. It is this block's alignment with the December solstice that leads archaeologists to believe the site was once a type of astronomical observatory. They believe the site was made by a sophisticated indigenous culture. One of the stones has a circular hole carved into it. During the winter solstice, the sun shines directly though this hole onto another rock for an extended amount of time, supporting the idea that Amazon Stonehenge was used as an astronomical site.

Apart from the circular hole the granite stones that make up Amazon Stonehenge appear irregularly shaped. Whether this irregularity reflects primitive mining technology or holds clues regarding potential uses of the site has not yet been determined.

During the excavations two large pits have been found, both approximately 1.5 – 2 meters deep and covered by large stone slabs. During excavation, shards of pottery, red clay, and ash from human remains were found. Three intact urns were found in a triangular formation at the bottom of one pit and more intact urns, as well as a few lids were found in the second. Remnants of cremated human remains have been found with these shards and in the urns, suggesting that these pits were either burial sites or that select human remains were buried here because they were significant. Shards of bowls and other pieces of pottery have been found in smaller pits near by. These bowls, lids, and urns have been found created in the shapes of animals and human-like figurines.

== Significance ==
Evidence has been found near the Rego Grande site and all over the Amazon to suggest that the indigenous people of the region lived in complex societies that involved both agriculture and a close relationship with the natural environment around them.

There are also several other megalithic sites in Brazil that follow the curves of the Rego Grande river. The fact that these Megalithic sites seem to follow such a pattern suggests that Amazon Stonehenge may have been used as either a ceremonial site and that its structure and cultural significance were shared amount different indigenous communities in pre-Columbian Brazil.

Despite not knowing the exact use of the Rego Grande site, most scientist agree that it alludes to a Pre-Cabraline society that was much more complex than previously thought.

== See also ==
- List of archaeoastronomical sites sorted by country
