= Lourenço =

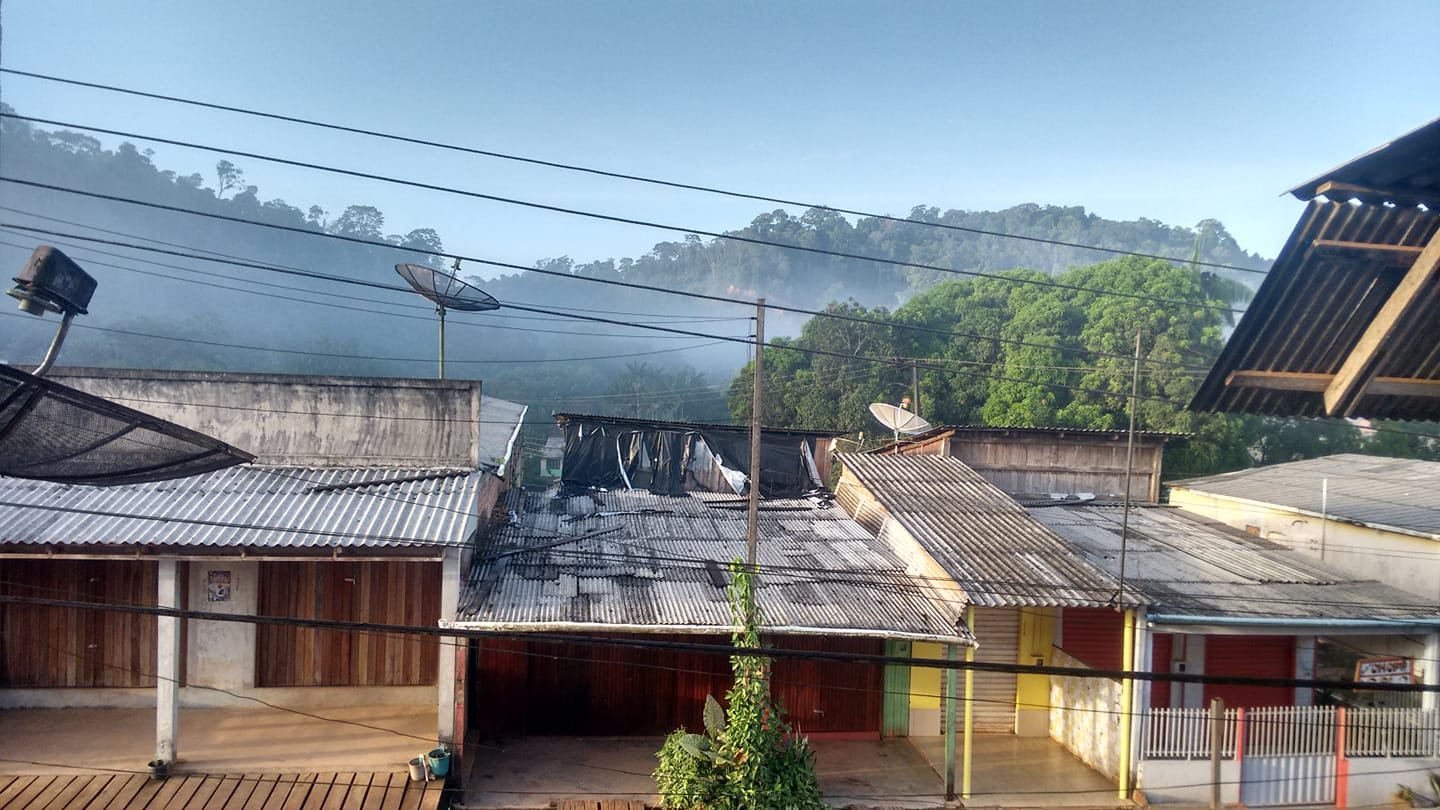

- Location in Brazil Lourenço (Brazil)
- Coordinates: 2.3053°N 51.6365°W
- Country: Brazil
- Region: North
- State: Amapá
- Municipality: Calçoene

Area
  - Total: 1,711 km^{2} (661 sq mi)

Population (2010)
  - Total: 1,866
  - Density: 1.091/km^{2} (2.825/sq mi)
- Time zone: UTC-3

Lourenço is a town and district in the Brazilian municipality of Calçoene, in the interior of the state of Amapá. The main economic activities of the town is gold mining. It is one of the oldest mines in Brazil.

== History ==
Gold mining in Lourenço began in the 19th century. In 1894, at the height of the gold rush, there were 6,000 to 10,000 gold miners in the area around the Calçoene River. In 1984, Mineração Novo Astro (MNA) and Mineração Yukio Yoshidome (MYYSA) were awarded concessions for mining on an industrial scale. This resulted in conflicts with the garimpeiros (illegal gold prospectors).

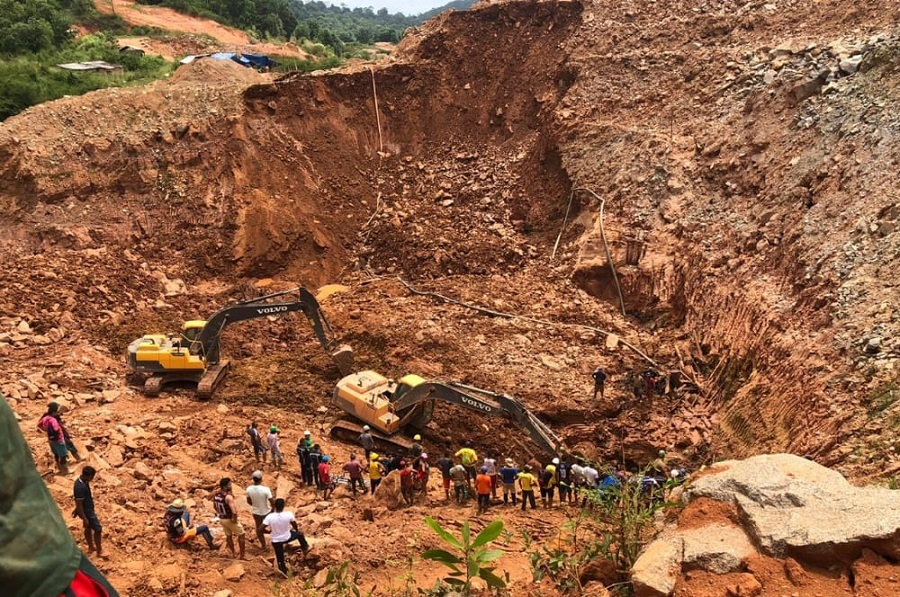
Landslide in a gold mine in Lourenço (2020)

In 1992, the Mining Cooperative of Garimpeiros of Lourenço (COOGAL) was founded, and the concessions were transferred to COOGAL in 1994. As of 2014, COOGAL operates five mining concessions and employs 1,100 garimpeiros. The official census figures for the district are an underestimation, and the actual population is estimated at 4,500 people.

Lourenço is located in an area surrounded by protected areas and indigenous territories. The region around Lourenço has been polluted with mercury, and has been deforested. The school and clinic are functioning below standard. In 2017, Lourenço received 24 hour electricity. The town is connected to the BR-156 highway via an unpaved road.

== Bibliography ==
- Chagas, Marco Antonio (2019). "A GEOPOLÍTICA DO GARIMPO DO LOURENÇO, NORTE DO AMAPÁ: TRAJETÓRIA, CONTRADIÇÕES E INSUSTENTABILIDADE". Boletim Goiano de Geografia (in Portuguese). 39. doi:10.5216/bgg.v39.55253 (inactive 12 July 2025).
