= Adolphe Brezet =

Adolphe Brézet

President of the Free State of Counani
- In office 1904–1912

Personal details
- Born: Jules Ernest Adolphe Joseph Brézet; 28 December 1873 Paris-VIII
- Died: 14 December 1918 (aged 44) South Ealing, London
- Occupation: Mercenary, adventurer, politician, cyclist

Adolphe Brézet (1873–1918) was a French military officer who proclaimed himself as the President of the Free State of Counani in South America from 1904 to 1912. Before entering the military, Brézet participated in some early long-distance cycling races, among which the first Paris-Brest-Paris race in 1891.

Brezet was a mysterious figure who fought against the British in the Boer Wars of South Africa in the late 19th century before arriving in South America, and the Boer Republics had diplomatic relations with Brezet as a result.

According to contemporary sources, Counani consisted of a group of European adventurers that settled in a remote part of what is now the Brazilian state of Amapá. In order to boost speculation for investments, the men of Counani built fifty miles of railway tracks that led nowhere and had no trains running on them.

The ultimate fate of Brezet is entirely unknown, and Counani ceased to exist around the year 1912. It was ultimately a failed business venture, and never achieved recognized independence, or even much attention from Brazil.

== See also ==
- Republic of Independent Guyana
