= Republic of Independent Guiana =

Former country in South America

First Republic of Independent Guyana (1886–1887) République de la Guyane Indépendante Second Republic of Independent Guyana (1887–1891) République de la Guyane Indépendante
- 1886–1891
- Flag (1886–1887) Flag (1887–1891) Coat of arms
- Motto: "Liberté et justice" ("Liberty and Justice")
- Anthem: "Marche triomphale de Counani" ("Triumphal March of Counani") By Hilarion de Croze, 1890
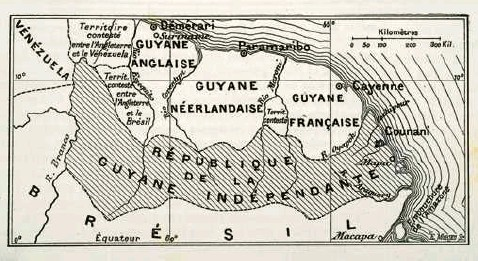
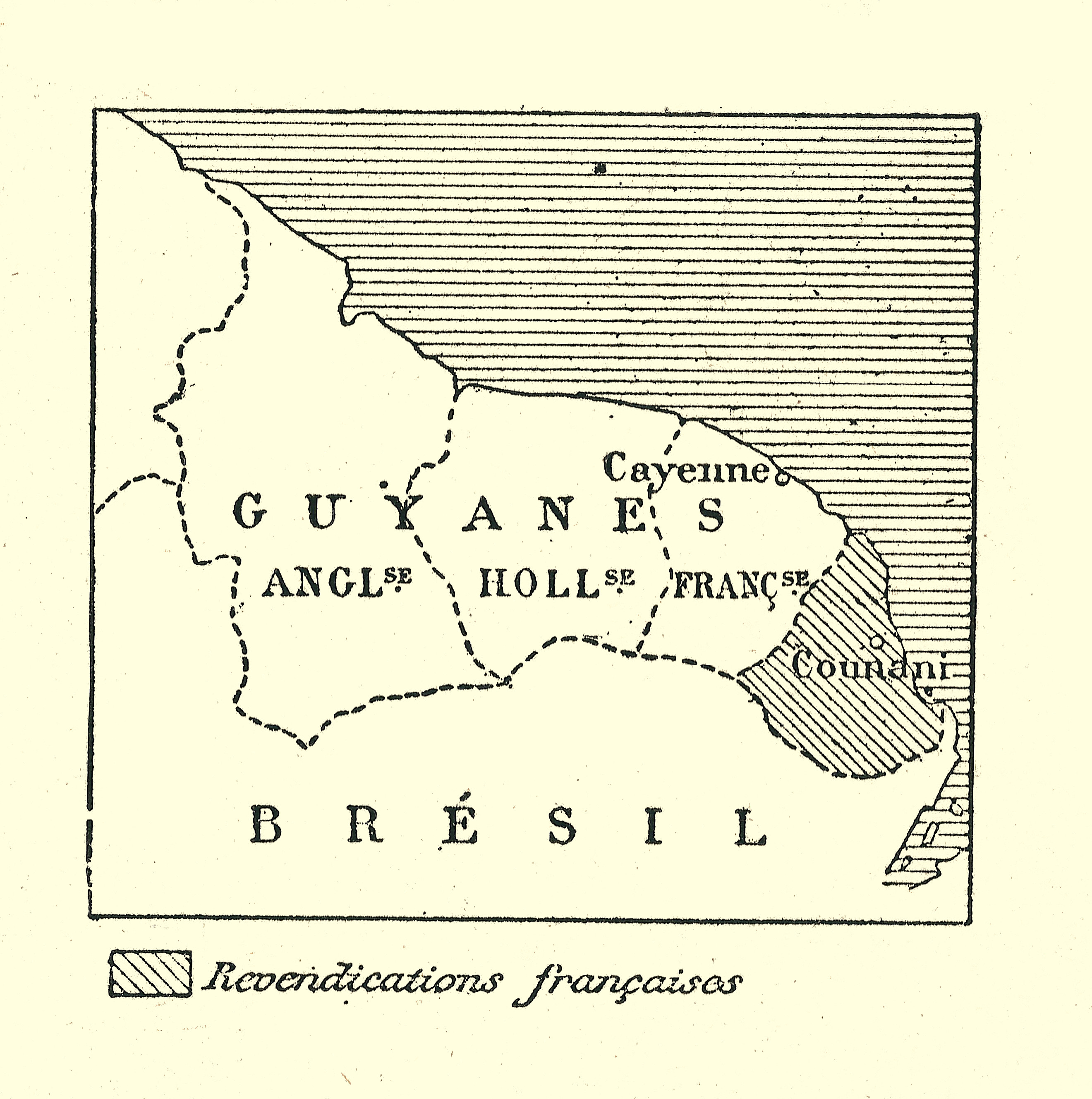
- Counani's territorial claims at their greatest; Counani's probable area of influence
- Capital and largest city: Counani; 2.8485°N 51.1250°W
- Official languages: French
- Common languages: Guyanese Creole and Portuguese (Note: Minority languages included: Arawak, Palijur, Kali'na, Wayana, Wayampi, Emerillon, Amapari, Amikoana)
- Religion: Catholic
- Demonyms: Counaniot, Counanian, Counanese
- Government: Authoritarian Republic (until 1887)
- Head of State
  - 1886–1891: Jules Gros (Note: elected as President, after being deposed in 1887 claimed the title of President for life)
  - 1887: Jean-Ferréol Guigues
  - 1894–1895: General Francisco Xavier da Veiga Cabral
- State Minister
  - 1886–1887: Jean-Ferréol Guigues
- Legislature: the State Council
- Historical era: Crisis of the Second Reign • República Velha
  - Guigues-Quartier Voyage: July 1886
- 2 September 1887
  - Second Republic proclaimed: 1887
  - Death of Jules Gros: 29 July 1891
  - Delimitation: 1 December 1900

Population
  - approx.: 300
- Currency: Franc Counaniote
- Today part of: Brazil; France

Counani (French pronunciation: [kunani]), (Note: 19th century Portuguese: Coanany; modern Portuguese: Cunani. Also, according to some English sources: Connani) officially the Republic of Independent Guyana (French: République de la Guyane Indépendante; French pronunciation: [ʁepyblik də la ɡɥijan ɛ̃dɛpɑ̃dɑ̃t]), or the Republic of Counani, was a state that emerged in 1886, in a disputed territory between what was Pinsônia, and French Guiana, composed mainly of native Brazilians, but also of crioulos, caboclos, and blacks, generally indifferent regarding whom would rule it.

It was proclaimed by French and Swiss adventurers who migrated there upon reading idyllic descriptions made by pseudo-anarchist explorer Henri Coudreau — who mapped and published extensively about it during his centennial journey in Pinsônia, challenging the public notion of a "Green Hell" — and proceeded to ally with the locals. The republic, initially presided over by the French intellectual Jules Gros, remained unrecognized.

At the beginning of the 20th century, former French Captain M. Adolphe Brézet (Note: Also written: Brezet. At Counani: Uayana Assu or Uayanna Assu) claimed, in Paris, to have been elected by the Counaniots to lead their nation after a prolonged stay in the region. His letter raised concerns in both Brazil and France, but it was soon revealed that he lacked the funds to travel there despite supposedly claiming around 1902 to be able to arrange loans amounting up to 50 million from the Germans. The filibuster's self-styled "Free State of Counani" briefly gained diplomatic recognition from Russia, Japan, Belgium and the Boer Republics before fading into obscurity in the 1910s.

== The Counani Region ==
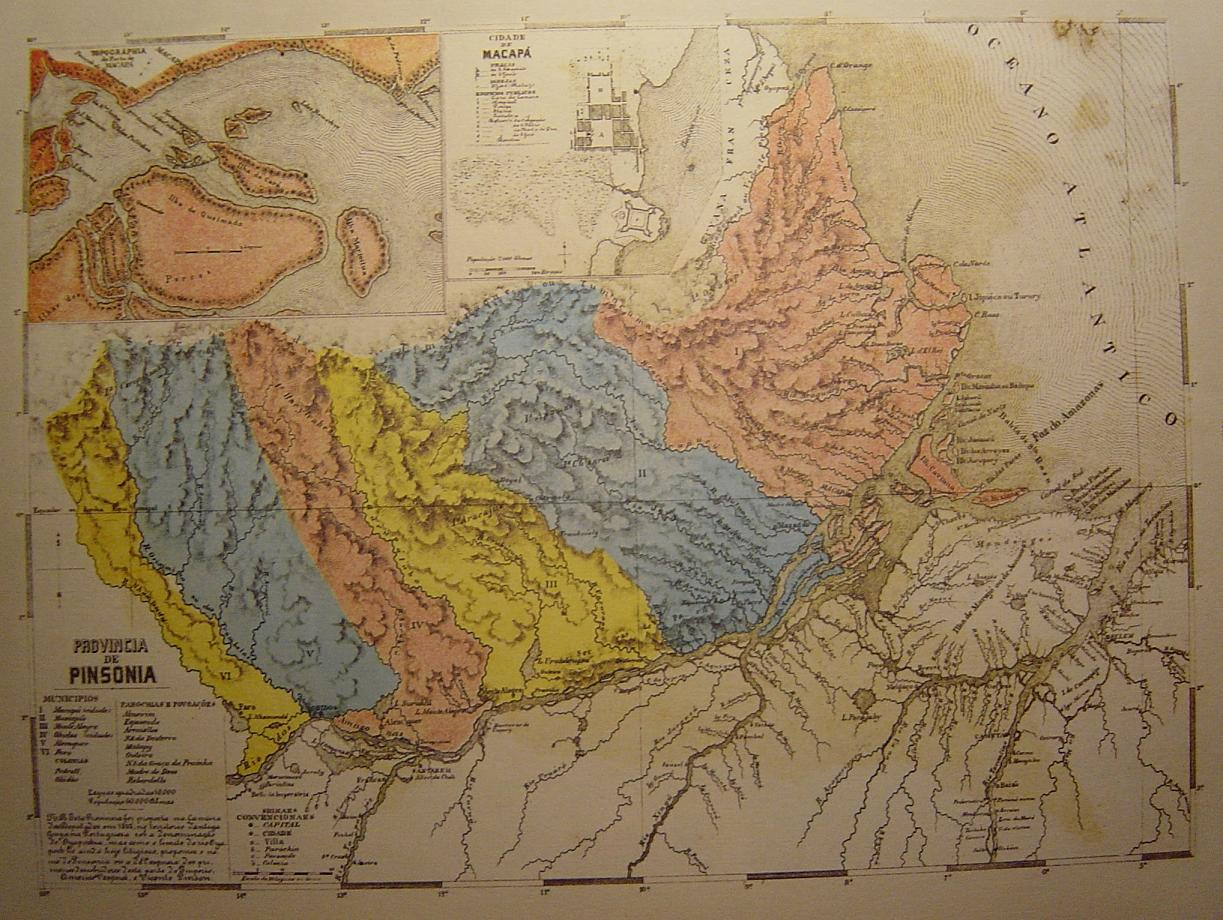
Pinsônia on the first Atlas of Brazil, 1868.

Long regarded in European lore as the fabled El Dorado, the area captivated imaginations for centuries. In its early days, pioneering priests ventured deep into the region, instructing the native inhabitants in the cultivation of cacao, coffee, and other vital crops, thereby transforming the landscape into productive agricultural zones. For over a century, the territory had been referred to as the "Conteste Franco-Brésilien" — a disputed zone that, despite its strategic and economic allure, remained largely unoccupied and ungoverned by either of the rival powers claiming it until the 1900s.

== Precedents ==
To protect themselves from the Cabanagem revolt, France built a fort in 1840 on the eastern bank of the Oyapock River, within what was then Brazilian-claimed territory. In response to this, Brazil established another fort past the Araguari, threatening France's claimed land.

The risk of war resulted in British mediation in 1841, after which the two rival forts were dismantled. His Imperial Majesty Dom Pedro II accepted the neutralization of the territory between the rivers, pending negotiations deciding its attribution.

While the Treaty of Paris was very clear, establishing the border at the Oyapock with mention of geographic coordinates, His Majesty, confident of prevailing in the dispute, allowed some flexibility in order to buy time and address internal challenges facing the Empire, which was threatened with fragmentation.

According to the 1901 Constitution of Counani, the state would be 25 years old, marking its foundation in 1876. Furthermore, The Sun claimed that the native Counanese had already established an independent government of their own in 1874, their democratically elected president being "M. Chaton", drafter of the State constitution, which bore his name.

This seems unlikely and satirical whatsoever, as "Chaton" literally means "kitten". Even then, he is part of a clear presidential line claimed by Segundo Sarrión y Díaz Herrera, "Counani's representative in Portugal, Spain and Morocco":

Chaton (1874–), Paul Cartier (Quartier?), Adolphe Brezet (1892–1894), Albert Franken (1894–?), Adolphe Brezet (1901-1910s). In addition, usurper Francisco X. V. Cabral (1895) was mentioned.

== The Republic (1886–1891) ==
The borders between the empires of France and the Brazil were not clear. Attempts at negotiations failed, and in 1862, it was decided that the area between the Amazon and the Oyapock rivers was a neutral territory. Paul Quartier, who had previously visited the territory in 1883, returned in 1885 and had a meeting with the village chiefs of Counani and Carsewenne (nowadays: Calçoene) who were hostile to the Brazilians. Quartier signed a treaty on 23 July 1886, creating the country of Counani in the disputed area.

In 1886, Gros embarked on a scheme hatched for him by British businessmen who wanted to make him president for life of the so-called new country in exchange for the right to control the country's infrastructure for ninety years.

A government was set up in Counani led by Jules Gros as president, Guigues as Minister of State and Quartier as Quartermaster. They set about recruiting settlers, and according to Le Gaulois, received over 3,000 requests. Both France and Brazil did not like what was happening and released a joint statement on 11 September 1887 stating that the Republic of Counani was not recognized. Gros was later deposed by his officials, and the death of Gros in 1891 resulted in the end of the short lived first Republic.

In 1894–95, the discovery of rich deposits of gold and precious stones in the Carsewenne region attracted several thousand Brazilian prospectors, disrupting the demographic balance in their favour. Rising ethnic tensions culminated in what became known as the "Mapá Incident".

The supposed Counani representative in Iberia and Morocco, claimed that on 12 December 1894, a popular uprising deposed Eugene Voissien, an influential warlord in Amapá, opening a door for what would happen.

In May 1895, Trajano Bentes, a pro-France former Brazilian slave and a leader of Carsewenne, was arrested by a Brazilian militia led by General Francisco Xavier da Veiga Cabral — who had declared an autonomous state under a triumvirate, allegedly protected by Brazil — which took him to be tried in the town of Mapá, predominantly Brazilian. In response, Camille Charvein, Governor of French Guiana, sent troops to the region to defend French territorial integrity—without the authorization of France's Foreign Affairs or Colonies Ministries. Trajano was freed, but a violent skirmish followed: the French captain along with six soldiers were killed, forcing the detachment to retreat. Around thirty Brazilian soldiers and civilians were also killed; claimed to be reprisals. It is claimed that Cabral would later be deposed by a "revolution" in the same year.

The incident sparked an international scandal. In 1897, both France and Brazil submitted the dispute to the Swiss, in what was called the Berne Arbitration, and on 1 December 1900, the neutral court awarded nearly all the contested area (147 out of 150 miles) to Brazil—a decision France accepted, though reportedly with indifference (Du Réau, 2000). The Counanians were not asked to participate in the adjustment, and not unreasonably refused, therefore, to be influenced by the decree or to recognize any impairment of their independence.

== L'État Libre du Counani (1892?–1918) ==
On 1 February 1901, adventurous Frenchman Monsieur Adolphe Brezet, described as the "Garibaldi of Counani" and a "nobleman poser" — who has been identified with more than one abortive buccaneer attempt —, reportedly president since 1892, was said to have been re-elected by the local Indian population after a general election, in January, as chief of Government, just a month after the Swiss arbitration was complete. He served his tenure mostly in Europe, while claiming an approximately 350 thousand square miles of land bound by the Amazon and Negro to the south, the Branco to the west, and the Guianas to the north.

Free State of Counani's flag

This incarnation of the Counanese State consisted of a President, followed by a Chancellor and a 10-member state council, along with a House of Representatives that consisted of an Upper Chamber and a Grand Council. Meanwhile, public security was assured by a permanent force of police and gendarmes—as every Counaniot, 15 to 60, had to be a soldier in varying degrees of intensity—and the republic was represented abroad by a "body of diplomatic and commercial agents in every land".

On 14 May 1903, the International Committee of the Red Cross received an act of accession to the Geneva Convention from the Free State. The signatory, Adolphe Brézet, styling himself as head of government, was promptly informed by the Committee that he lacked the legal authority to make such a declaration on behalf of the people of Counani.

In 1906 the Counanian government published, to clarify the righteousness of their position, a diplomatic paper called "Red Book No. 3": described as "really very nicely printed", with "fairly correct" punctuation, "clear and easy to read". The book also mentions that old motto of "Justice and Liberty" was retained, but a supplementary trademark was added: "Je maintiendrai par la Raison ou par la Force". A copy is on file in the United States State Department at Washington.

"There is much in that pamphlet to appeal to free-spirited Americans, and the claims there adduced should properly be considered apart from the machinations of men like the Baron de Ott and his kind. The Brazilian government has done little or nothing toward developing the region in question. Tropical woods and the wealth hidden in the soil have made Counani much to be desired by those in power at Rio de Janeiro. For the same reasons, perhaps, Germany has looked upon the territory with greedy eyes."

— The Sun, Modern Romance in the Land of El Dorado: Strange Adventurers Figured in the Attempt to Take Guiana From Brazil—Germans Lurked in Background—One Excellency Now in City Prison, Paper 4 of August 4th, 1918

The South African Boer Republics opened diplomatic relations with Brezet (who had fought for them previously during the Boer Wars), and in 1904, Japan and Russia asked for vessels which Brézet didn't have and thus exposed himself to France and Brazil. It was said: "Another illusion gone, another castle in Spain crumbled to dust and ashes in Counani. Nothing remains, not even Port Tarascon of the immortal Tartarin". — Paris correspondence, New York Press.

In 1910 Brezet recruited "His Excellency the Honourable" Thomas L. Reynolds, former Tammany ward leader, as "Ambassador Plenipotentiary from the Amazon Republic" in New York, who would later be arrested in 1918.

In 1911 he was exiled to London.

In 1913, he claimed support of "British military and naval men" in a plan to expel Brazilian presence in the region and re-establish the Utopian Republic.

On 29 January 1916, Counani declared war on Germany, before that, it was especulated that the Free State was a German plan to capture the resource rich region in Brazil.

== The 1990s Revival ==
In 1990s Paris, the "Constitutional Executive in Exile of the Free State of Counani" emerged, aiming to protest the treatment of Indian peoples and environmental degradation in Amapá. Their flag replicated the original design of Gros' republic, with the addition of the white star on its centre.

== The Counaniot Stamp Tradition ==
One consistent feature throughout most of the history of Counani was the issuance of stamps, reflecting its struggle to claim sovereignty. As philatelist Gauthier Toulemonde noted in The Atlas of Philately (from A to B): "It is unimaginable for a country not to issue stamps, which are a mark of power and sovereignty."

The government of the Free State tried to join the Universal Postal Union, which the bureau at Berne respectfully acknowledged, but silly adds that it is impossible to give the information requested until the moment when the recognition of Counani has had been obtained.

== Other members of Counani's government and army ==
As of 3 September 1904:

Commander of the Army: Baron Jette de Ryckel

Financial Secretary: Joseph Marie Brezet, Duc de Beaufort

Secretary of State for Foreign Affairs: M. Isidore Lopez Lapuya
