= Calçoene =

Municipality in Amapá, Brazil

- Municipality
- Município de Calçoene
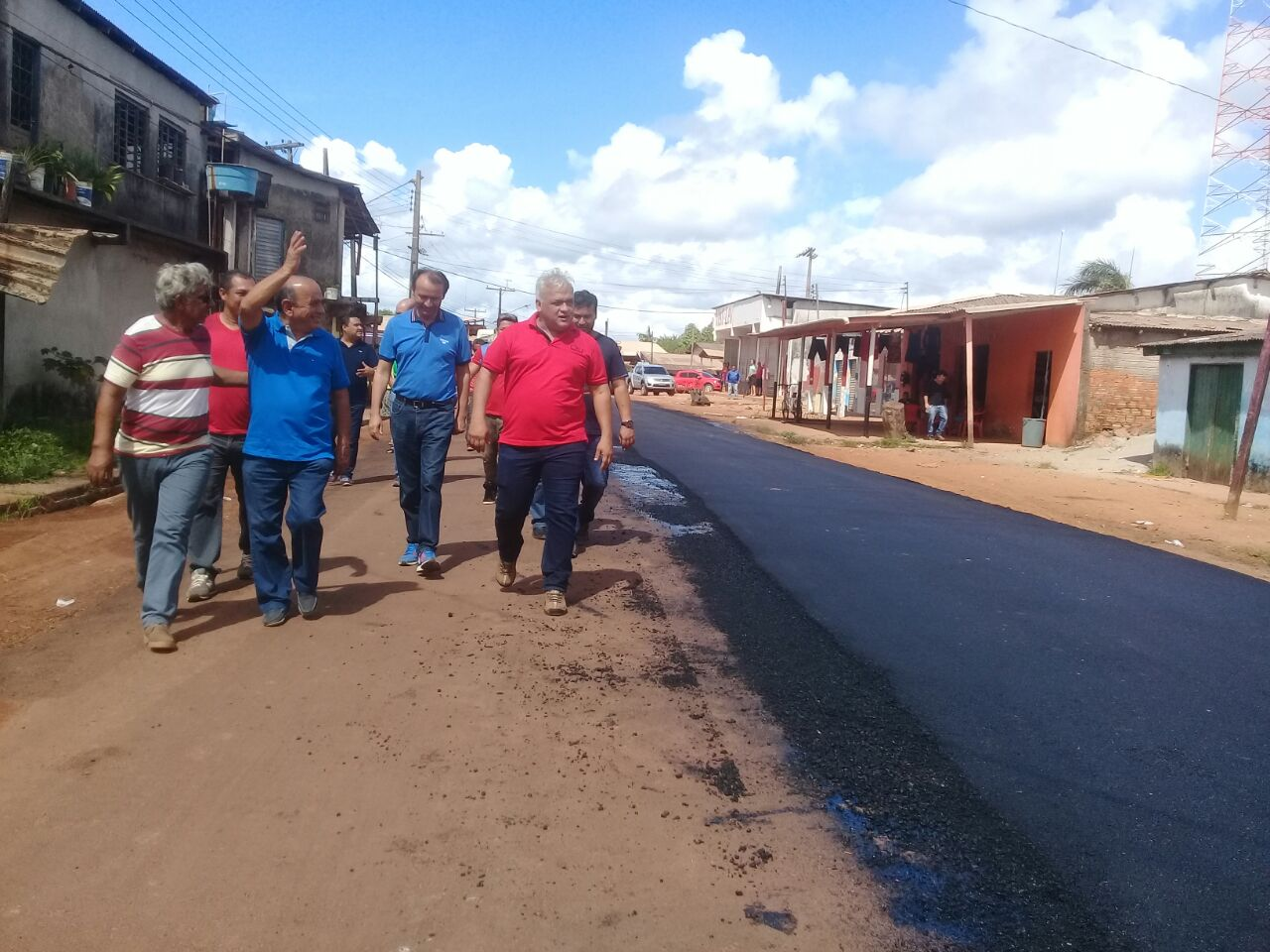
- The Governor inspects the new road in Calçoene

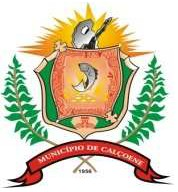
- Flag Coat of arms

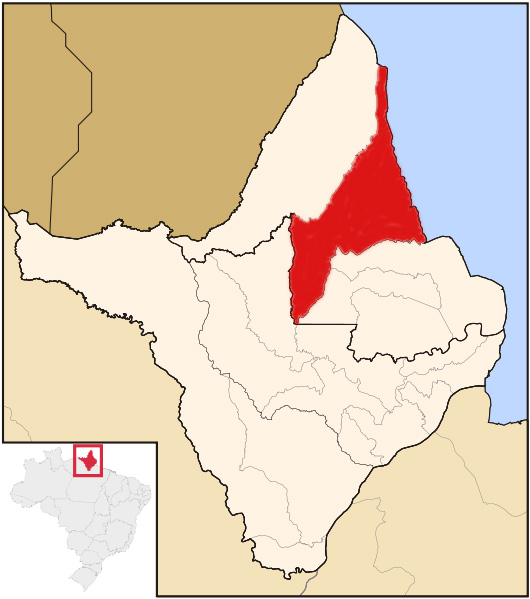
- Location of Calçoene in the State of Amapá

- Location within Brazil
- Coordinates: 02°29′52″N 50°56′56″W
- Country: Brazil
- Region: North
- State: Amapá
- Founded: 22 December 1945

Government
  - Mayor: Lindoval Santos do Rosario (PSC)

Area
  - Total: 14,269 km^{2} (5,509 sq mi)
- Elevation: 3.0 m (10 ft)

Population (2020)
  - Total: 11,306
  - Density: 0.79235/km^{2} (2.0522/sq mi)
- Time zone: UTC−3 (BRT)
- HDI (2010): 0.643 – medium
- Website: www.calcoene.ap.gov.br

Calçoene (Brazilian Portuguese pronunciation: [kawsoˈeni]) is a municipality located in the east of the state of Amapá, Brazil. It is located on the Atlantic Ocean in the Amazon jungle basin near French Guiana. Calçoene covers 14,269 square kilometres (5,509 mi^{2}) and has a population is 11,306. The name Calçoene is a corruption of "Calço N" (North Wedge, one of four mining zones defined by the Brazilian Government at the beginning of the 20th century).

The city has the highest rainfall of any in Brazil, with an annual average of 4,165 millimetres (164.0 in). Calçoene is noted for its ancient megalithic observatory, often referred to as the "Amazon Stonehenge".

== History ==
The borders between French Guiana and Brazil were not clear, and in the 19th century, it was decided that the area between the Amazon and the Oyapock River was a neutral territory. Paul Quartier had a meeting with the village chiefs of Cunani and Carsewenne (nowadays: Calçoene) in 1885. In 1886, the Republic of Independent Guiana was founded by a group of French adventurers and two village chiefs with Cunani as the capital. The unrecognised republic lasted until 1891. In 1900, the territory was awarded to Brazil. Calçoene became a municipality in 1956.

== Geography ==
Calçoene is bordered on the north and east by the Atlantic Ocean, to the south by the municipalities of Amapá and Pracuúba, and to the west by the municipalities of Oiapoque and Serra do Navio. Calçoene is 272 kilometres (169 mi) from the state capital of Macapá. The municipality contains 23.23% of the 2,369,400-hectare (5,855,000-acre) Amapá State Forest, a sustainable use conservation unit established in 2006.

== Tourism ==
One of the most popular tourist attraction is the Goiabal beach on the Atlantic Ocean, which is located 14 kilometers from the town of Calçoene. The beach is 4 kilometres long and the water is dark due to the influence of the Amazon.

=== Calçoene megalithic observatory ===
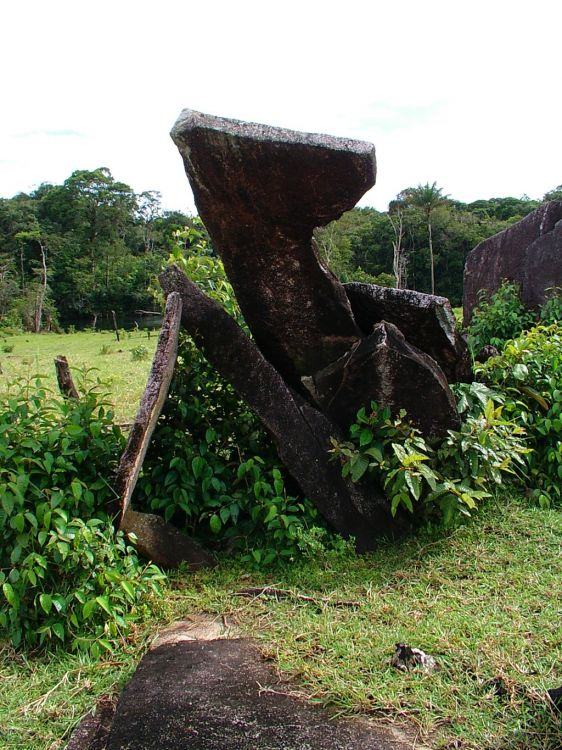

In May 2006, archeologists announced they had found a pre-colonial astronomical observatory, possibly 500 to 2,000 years old, near Calçoene. The age is based on pottery sherds on site that have been dated to 2,000 years old. The site is on a hill and has 127 large stones blocks of granite, each 3 metres (9.8 ft) high, and dug firmly into the ground. Archaeologist Mariana Petry Cabral of the Amapa Institute of Scientific and Technological Research (IEPA) said that the observatory has been designed to align with the winter solstice. Other agricultural societies also developed sophisticated ways to track important times in the solar calendar. At one time, researchers did not think any cultures in the Amazon Basin had developed such complexity as to build such a site. This has altered their thinking.

== Subdivisions ==
The municipality of Calçoene contains three districts:

- Calçoene (town)
- Cunani
- Lourenço

== See also ==
- List of archaeoastronomical sites sorted by country
