= Giant's Church =

Type of neolithic structure

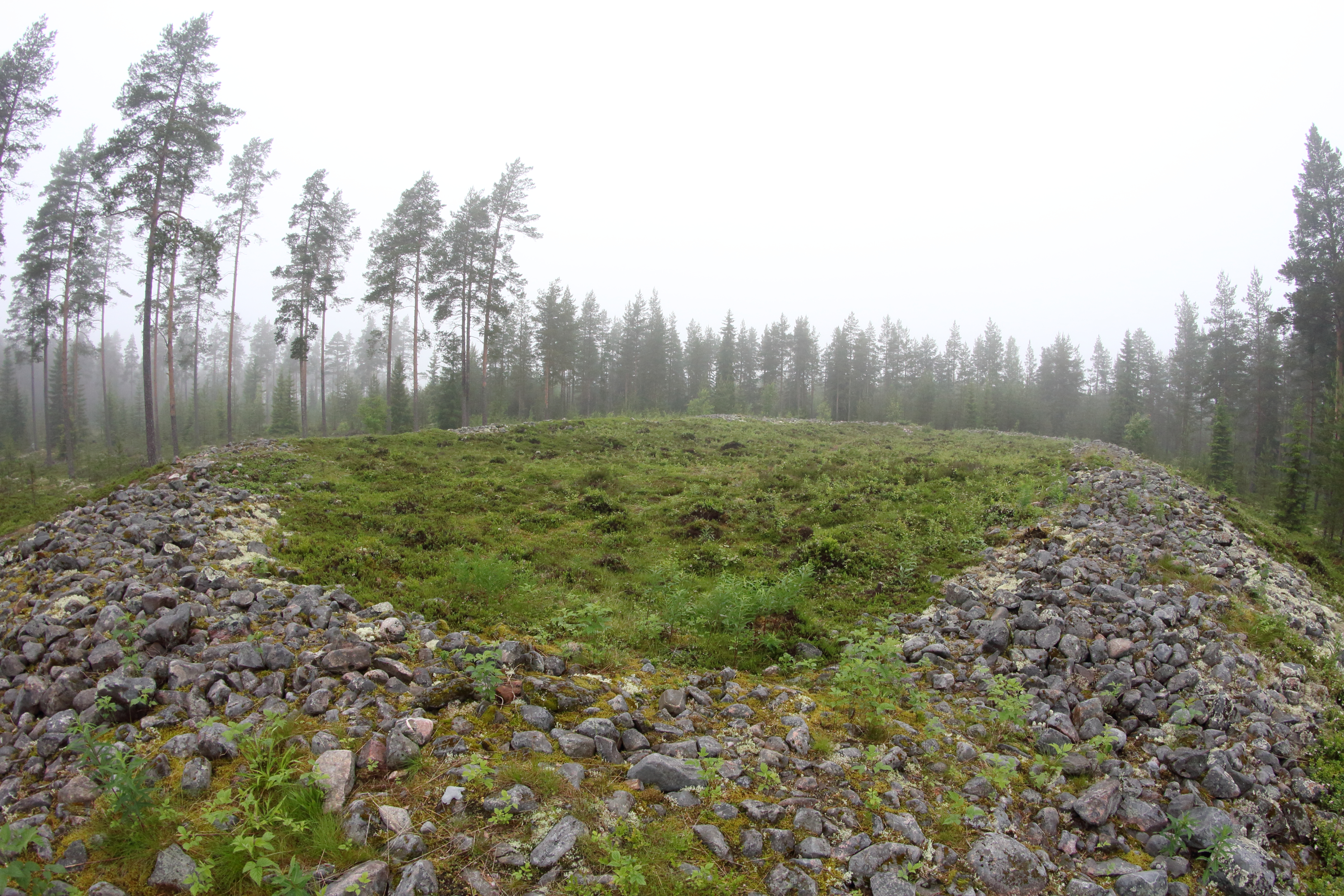
Giant's Church at Kastelli

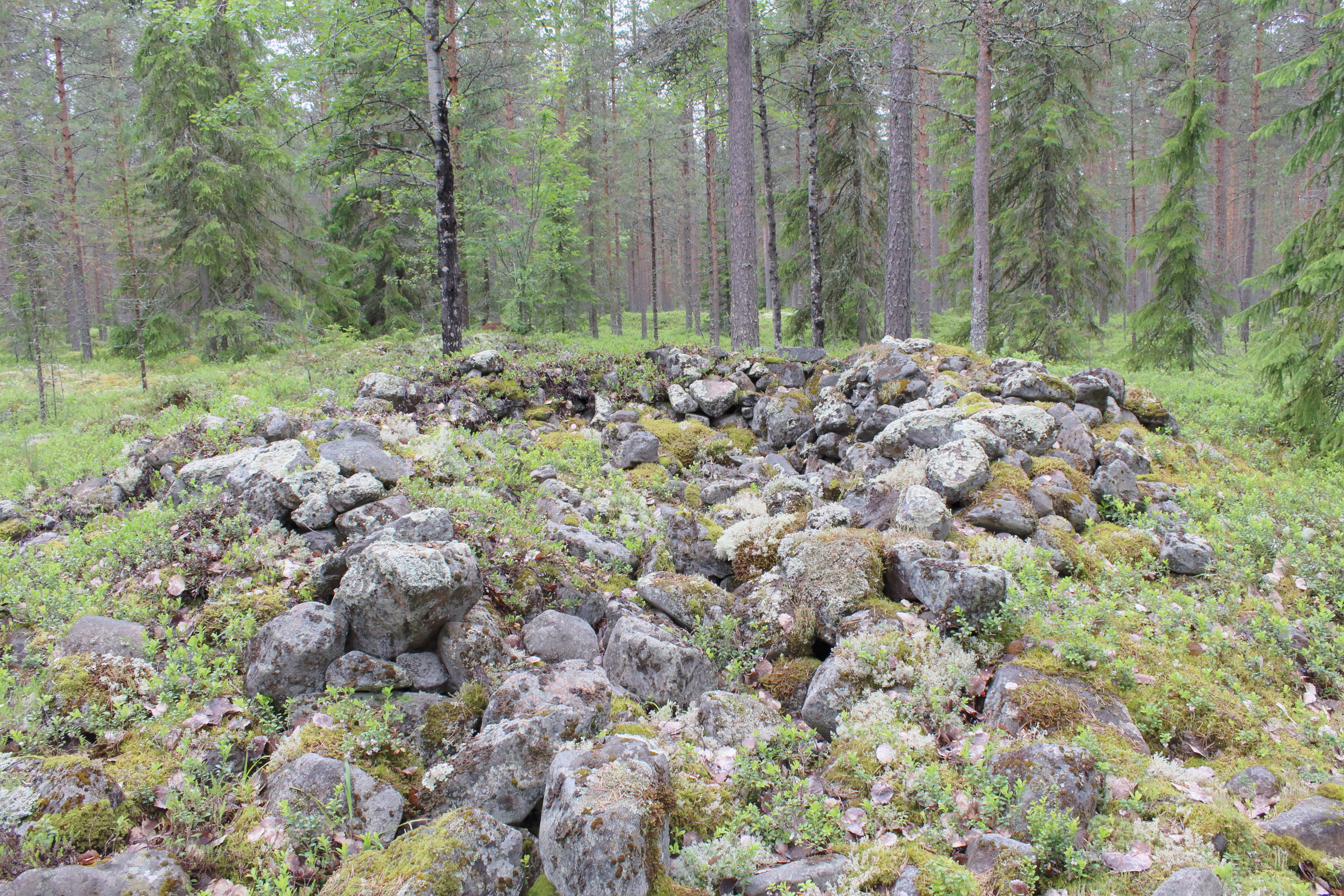
Giant's Church at Kettukangas

A Giant's Church (Finnish: Jätinkirkko, jatulinkirkko) is the name given to prehistoric stone enclosures found along the coast of Ostrobothnia region of Finland in an area that roughly stretches from Kokkola to Kemi, with the densest concentration around Raahe and Oulu. Dating from the subneolithic period (3500–2000 BC), they are an example of monumental architecture built by hunter-gatherers in Northern Europe.

== Description ==
The stone enclosures are rectangular or oval boulder embankments. Around forty sites are known, located in a 400-kilometre (250 mi) strip on the northwest coast of Finland (Ostrobothnia). Although located inland today, they were probably originally on the seashore. There is no hard evidence as to their intended use. It is possible they were used by hunters of seals on spring ice, who were away from their usual dwelling places.

One of the largest known sites is Kastelli Giant's Church, which encloses an area of 60 by 35 metres (197 by 115 ft). The Giants' Churches have been dated to the "subneolithic" (ie. Mesolithic people who are beginning to use Neolithic artefacts) around 3500–2000 BC. By 1500 BC they were abandoned.
