= Cunani, Calçoene =

District in Calçoene, Brazil

Cunani
- Location in Brazil Cunani (Brazil)
- Coordinates: 2°51′33″N 51°7′44″W
- Country: Brazil
- Region: North
- State: Amapá
- Municipality: Calçoene
- Elevation: 28 m (92 ft)

Population (2010)
  - Total: 940
- Time zone: UTC−3 (BRT)

Cunani (also Counani) is a district in the Brazilian municipality of Calçoene, in the interior of the state of Amapá. According to the Brazilian Institute of Geography and Statistics (IBGE), its population in 2010 was 940 inhabitants, 516 men and 424 women, with a total of 343 private households. Cunani is a recognised Quilombo (escaped slaves) settlement. It was also the capital of two unrecognised countries.

== History ==
The dispute between France and Brazil about the region between the Oiapoque and the Amazon River in the 19th century attracted escaped Brazilian slaves to the region. The Quilombo were joined by French and Brazilian traders and adventurers. Between 1886 and 1891, the town of Cunani was the capital of the unrecognised Republic of Independent Guiana, In 1900, the territory was awarded to Brazil. Not withstanding that fact, Cunani became the capital of the unrecognised Free State of Counani between 1901 and 1904.

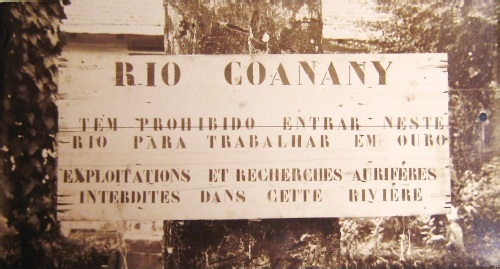
Forbidden to look for gold on the Cunani River in Portuguese and French (1894)

In the 20th century, Brazilian migrants settled in Cunani, and the economy of the village was mainly based on fur trade, fishing and supplying the garimpeiro (illegal gold prospectors) who were active in the area. The opening of BR-156 in the early 1970s resulted in a migration to Calçoene. The restricting of access to the Cunani River accelerated the decline. Açaí became the main export product for the village.

In 2015, Cunani was recognised as a Quilombo settlement inhabited by Brazilian Maroons, and has been given its own territory similar to the indigenous territories.

== Climate ==
Cunani has a tropical monsoon climate (Am) with moderate to little rainfall from August to November and heavy to very heavy rainfall in the remaining months.

Climate data for Cunani
Month	Jan	Feb	Mar	Apr	May	Jun	Jul	Aug	Sep	Oct	Nov	Dec	Year
Mean daily maximum °C (°F)	29.2 (84.6)	28.6 (83.5)	29.5 (85.1)	29.3 (84.7)	29.6 (85.3)	30.1 (86.2)	31.0 (87.8)	31.9 (89.4)	32.7 (90.9)	33.0 (91.4)	32.2 (90.0)	30.5 (86.9)	30.6 (87.1)
Daily mean °C (°F)	25.5 (77.9)	25.2 (77.4)	25.7 (78.3)	25.9 (78.6)	26.0 (78.8)	26.0 (78.8)	26.3 (79.3)	26.8 (80.2)	27.1 (80.8)	26.9 (80.4)	26.6 (79.9)	26.1 (79.0)	26.2 (79.1)
Mean daily minimum °C (°F)	21.9 (71.4)	21.9 (71.4)	22.0 (71.6)	22.5 (72.5)	22.5 (72.5)	22.0 (71.6)	21.7 (71.1)	21.7 (71.1)	21.5 (70.7)	20.9 (69.6)	21.1 (70.0)	21.7 (71.1)	21.8 (71.2)
Average rainfall mm (inches)	429 (16.9)	434 (17.1)	457 (18.0)	485 (19.1)	554 (21.8)	346 (13.6)	186 (7.3)	92 (3.6)	45 (1.8)	36 (1.4)	101 (4.0)	319 (12.6)	3,484 (137.2)
Source: Climate-Data.org

== Bibliography ==
- Kohler, Florent; Eloy, Ludivine (2011). New Knowledge in a New Era of Globalization. doi:10.5772/25192.
