= Kastelli Giant's Church =

- Kastellin jätinkirkko (Finnish)
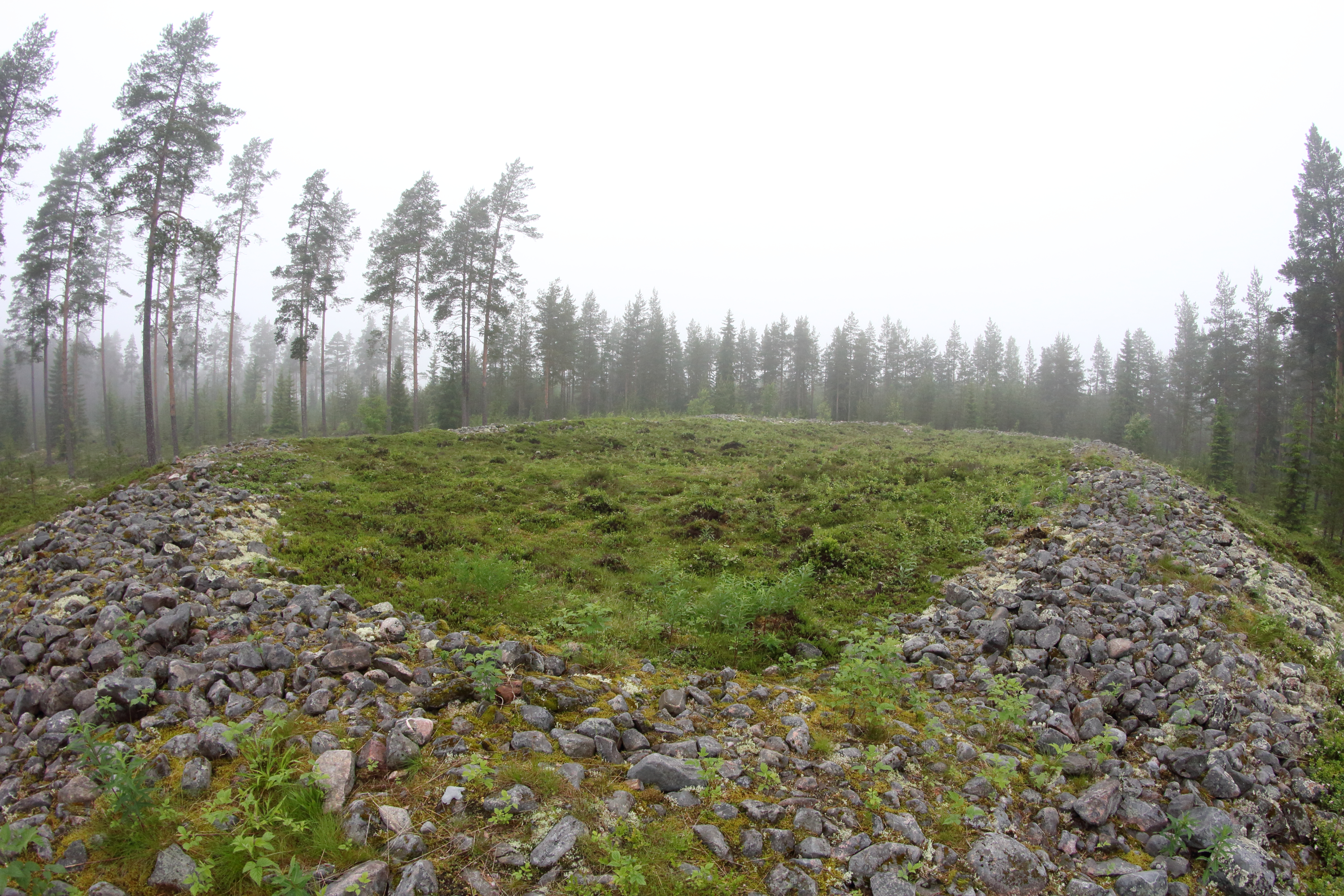
- Kastelli Giant's Church, viewed from the southeast corner

- Location within Finland
- Interactive map of Kastelli Giant's Church
- 64°37′52.7″N 24°42′41.8″E
- Type: Enclosure
- Periods: Neolithic
- Location: Pattijoki, Northern Ostrobothnia

Kastelli Giant's Church (Finnish: Kastellin jätinkirkko) is a prehistoric stone enclosure situated near Pattijoki in the North Ostrobothnia region of Finland. It is one of the largest of forty such "Giant's Churches" to be found in this region of Finland. It dates to around 2000 BC.

== Description ==
The Giant's Church at Kastelli is a rectangular stone enclosure measuring around 60 by 35 metres. The walls are seven metres wide and survive to a height of two metres. There are six gateways. When built it would have been on a rocky shoreline. The enclosure is surrounded by more than twenty stone cairns. Holes found in the area may have been for the storing of killed animals.

The site was excavated in the 1920s; it has been dated to around 2000 BC.
