= Alphonse de Beauchamp =

French historian (1767–1832)

Alphonse de Beauchamp (1767–1832) was a French historian.

== Life ==
Beauchamp was born in Monaco and educated in Paris. He entered the Sardinian military service in 1784, but suffered imprisonment in 1792 for refusing to bear arms against the French Republic. Beauchamp escaped to France, where he obtained a position in the office of the Minister of Police, and was assigned the surveillance of the press.

Beauchamp commenced his Histoire de la Vendée et des Chouans (three volumes, Paris, 1806), which depicted the cruelties of the Fouché regime. This book displeased the Emperor, and Beauchamp was banished to Rheims. He was recalled in 1811 and received a subordinate appointment. Under the Restoration, he received a pension and wrote for the Moniteur and the Gazette de France.

The Mémoires of Fouché (Paris, 1828–29) and those of Fauche-Borel have also been ascribed to him, but in the case of the former it seems certain that he only revised and completed a work really composed by Fouché himself.

== Works ==
- Le faux Dauphin (1803)
- Histoire de la campagne de Suwarow en Italie
- Histoire de la Captivité de Pie VII
- Histoire du Pérou (1807)
- Vie politique, militaire et privee du general Moreau (1814)
- Catastrophe de Murat, ou Recit de la derniere revolution de Naples (1815)
- Histoire du Brésil (1815)
- Histoire des campagnes de 1814 et 1815 (1817)
- Biographie des jeunes gens, ou Vies des grands hommes (1818)
- Histoire de la guerre d'Espagne et du Portugal, 1807-1813 (1819)
- Vie de Jules César (1821)
- Vie de Louis XVIII (1821)
- Histoire de la revolution de Piemont (2 vols., 1821, 1823)
- Collection de memoires relatifs aux revolutions d'Espagne (1824)
- Mémoires secrètes et inédites pour servir à l'histoire contemporaine (1825)
