= Finns =

Baltic Finnic ethnic group

Finns Suomalaiset
Total population
- c. 6–7 million^{[a]}

Regions with significant populations
- Finland c. 4.7–5.1 million^{[b]} Other significant population centers
- United States: 653,222
- Sweden: 156,045^{[c]}–712,000^{[d]} (including Tornedalians)
- Canada: 143,645
- Russia: 34,300 (with Ingrian Finns)
- Australia: 27,811
- Norway: 15,000–60,000 (including Forest Finns and Kvens)
- Germany: 33,000 (2022)
- United Kingdom: 15,000–30,000
- Spain: 17,433 (in 2022) (up to 40,000 part-year residents)
- Estonia: 8,260
- France: 7,000
- Netherlands: 5,000
- Denmark: 4,143
- Italy: 4,000
- Switzerland: 3,800
- Brazil: 3,100
- Belgium: 3,000
Other countries
Greece	1,600
Thailand	1,500–2,000
United Arab Emirates	1,500
China	1,500
Portugal	1,424
Ireland	1,200
Austria	1,000 (in 2001)
Poland	1,000
Japan	800
Singapore	700
Israel	700
South Korea	624
New Zealand	573 (in 2013)
Cyprus	500
Argentina	150–200
Uruguay	100

Languages
- Finnish and its dialects

Religion
- Predominantly Lutheranism or irreligious, Catholic and Eastern Orthodox minority

Related ethnic groups
- other Baltic Finns; Volga Finns; Sámi
- ^{a} The total figure is merely a sum of all the referenced populations listed.^{b} No official statistics are kept on ethnicity. However, statistics of the Finnish population according to first language and citizenship are documented and available.^{c} Finnish born population resident in Sweden. This figure likely includes all Finnish-born (regardless of ethnic background) and as such might be misleading.^{d} Swedish population with at least partial Finnish background.

Finns or Finnish people (Finnish: suomalaiset, IPA: [ˈsuo̯mɑlɑi̯set]) are a Baltic Finnic ethnic group native to Finland. Finns are traditionally divided into smaller regional groups that span several countries adjacent to Finland, both those who are native to these countries as well as those who have resettled. Some of these may be classified as separate ethnic groups, rather than subgroups of Finns. These include the Kvens and Forest Finns in Norway, the Tornedalians in Sweden, and the Ingrian Finns in Russia.

Finnish, the language spoken by Finns, is closely related to other Balto-Finnic languages such as Estonian and Karelian. The Finnic languages are a subgroup of the larger Uralic family of languages, which also includes Hungarian. These languages are markedly different from most other languages spoken in Europe, which belong to the Indo-European family of languages. Native Finns can also be divided according to dialect into subgroups sometimes called heimo (lit. 'tribe'), although such divisions have become less important due to internal migration.

Today, there are approximately 6–7 million ethnic Finns and their descendants worldwide, with the majority of them living in their native Finland and the surrounding countries, namely Sweden, Russia and Norway. An overseas Finnish diaspora has long been established in the countries of the Americas and Oceania, with the population of primarily immigrant background, namely Australia, Canada, New Zealand, Brazil, and the United States.

== Terminology ==
In Finnish, the term suomalaiset (sing. suomalainen) refers both to ethnic Finns and to citizens of Finland. Swedish, Finland's second official language, makes a distinction that Finnish does not: finländare refers to citizens of Finland regardless of ethnicity, while finne denotes ethnic or linguistic Finnishness. Historically, however, finne also carried the civic meaning during the 19th century.

It is a matter of debate how best to designate the Finnish-speakers of Sweden, all of whom have migrated to Sweden from Finland. Terms used include Sweden Finns and Finland Swedes, with a distinction almost always made between more recent Finnish immigrants, most of whom have arrived after World War II, and Tornedalians, who have lived along what is now the Swedish-Finnish border since the 15th century.

The term Finn is also used in a wider sense to include ethnically or linguistically related peoples, such as the Baltic Finns.

== Etymology ==
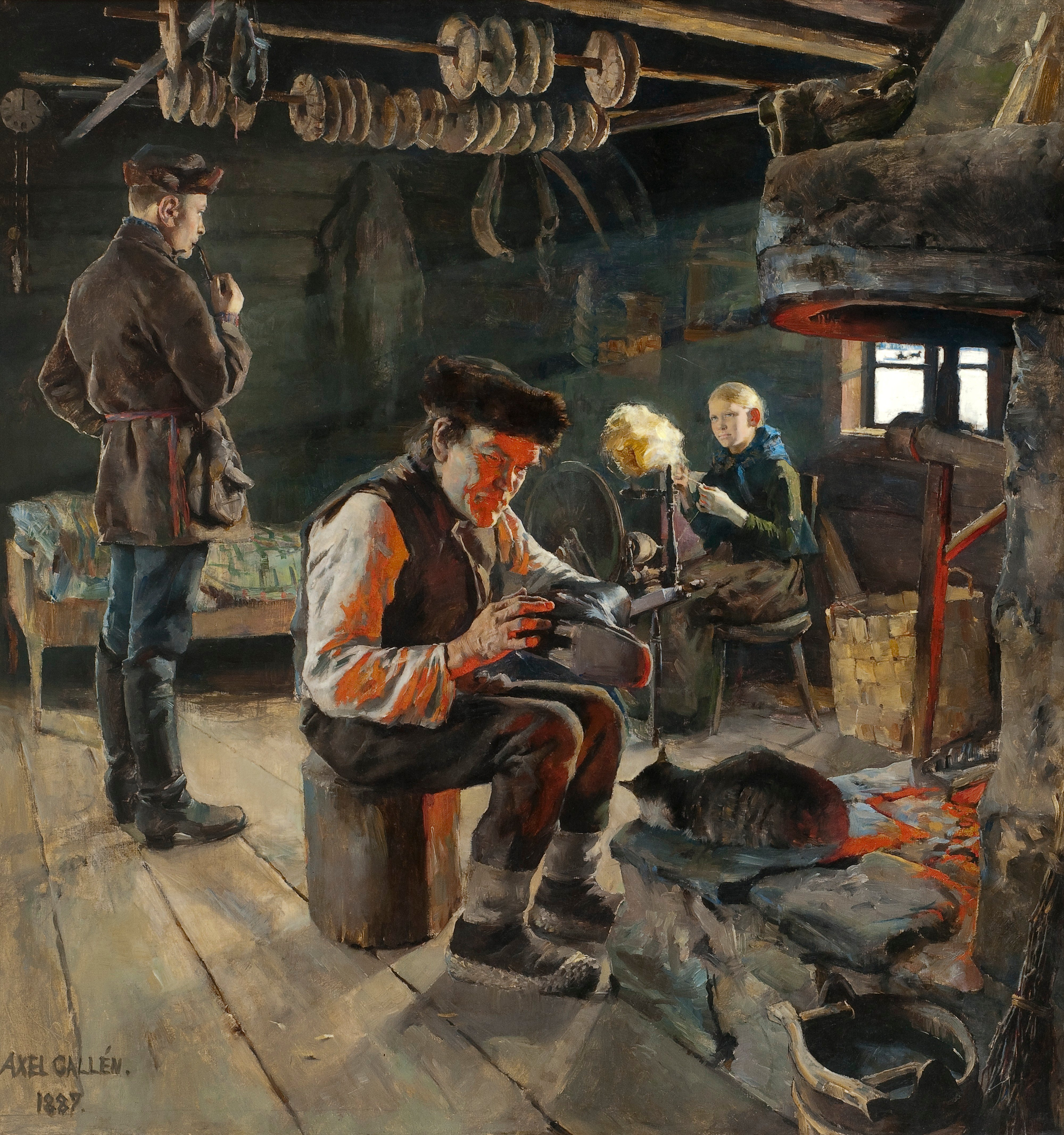
19th century Fennomans consciously sought to define the Finnish people through depiction of the common people's everyday lives in art, such as this painting by Akseli Gallen-Kallela.

Historical references to Northern Europe are scarce, and the names given to its peoples and geographic regions are obscure; therefore, the etymologies of the names are questionable. Such names as Fenni, Phinnoi, Finnum, and Skrithfinni / Scridefinnum appear in a few written texts starting from about two millennia ago in association with peoples located in a northern part of Europe, but the real meaning of these terms is debatable.

The oldest known attestation is by the Roman historian Tacitus, who mentions the Fenni in his Germania (c. 98 AD); the term recurs in the 2nd century as Phinnoi in the work of Ptolemy. It remains unclear whether these authors meant only the Sámi, or a broader grouping of peoples that may have included the Baltic Finnic peoples as well.

It has been suggested that this non-Uralic ethnonym is of Germanic language origin and related to such words as Old High German: finthan, lit. 'find, notice'; Old English: fanthian, lit. 'check, try'; and fendo (Middle High German: vende) 'pedestrian, wanderer'. Another etymological interpretation associated this ethnonym with fen in a more toponymical approach, but this derivation is considered phonologically untenable. Yet another theory postulates that the words Finn and Kven are cognates. The Icelandic Eddas and Norse sagas (11th to 14th centuries), some of the oldest written sources probably originating from the closest proximity, use words like finnr and Finnas inconsistently. However, most of the time they seem to mean northern dwellers with a mobile life style.

Current linguistic research supports the hypothesis of an etymological link between the Finnish and the Sami languages and other modern Uralic languages. There are two main competing hypotheses on the shared etymological origin of the toponyms Sápmi (Northern Sami for 'Lapland') and Suomi (Finnish for 'Finland'). According to one, Suomi derives, through a chain of loans between Proto-Finnic, Sami, and Baltic languages, from a Baltic word meaning "land," and is thereby connected to the name of the historical province Häme (Finnish for 'Tavastia') as well as sápmi itself.

According to the other, more recently proposed hypothesis, Suomi and sápmi instead reflect a shared Proto-Finnic–Sami self-designation of obscure origin, rather than being Baltic loanwords; under this interpretation the origin of the shared form remains unclear, and Häme would in turn be a later loan from its Sami form.

Older hypotheses connecting Suomi/suomi to Finnish suo ("marsh") have been rejected on semantic and morphological grounds. This research also supports the earlier hypothesis that the designation Suomi started out as the designation for Southwest Finland (Finland Proper, Varsinais-Suomi) and later for their language and later for the whole area of modern Finland. But it is not known how, why, and when this occurred. Petri Kallio had suggested that the name Suomi may bear even earlier Indo-European echoes with the original meaning of either "land" or "human", but he has since disproved his hypothesis.

Among the first written sources possibly designating western Finland as the land of Finns are also two rune stones. One, now lost, stood at Söderby-Karls church in Norrtälje Municipality, Sweden, with the inscription finlont (U 582); it is broadly dated to the Viking Age (725–1100). The only other known runic occurrence is a memorial stone at Rute church on Gotland (G 319), which on art-historical grounds (comparison of its cross form with English grave slabs at Bakewell) has been dated to the 13th century, considerably later than U 582.

== History ==
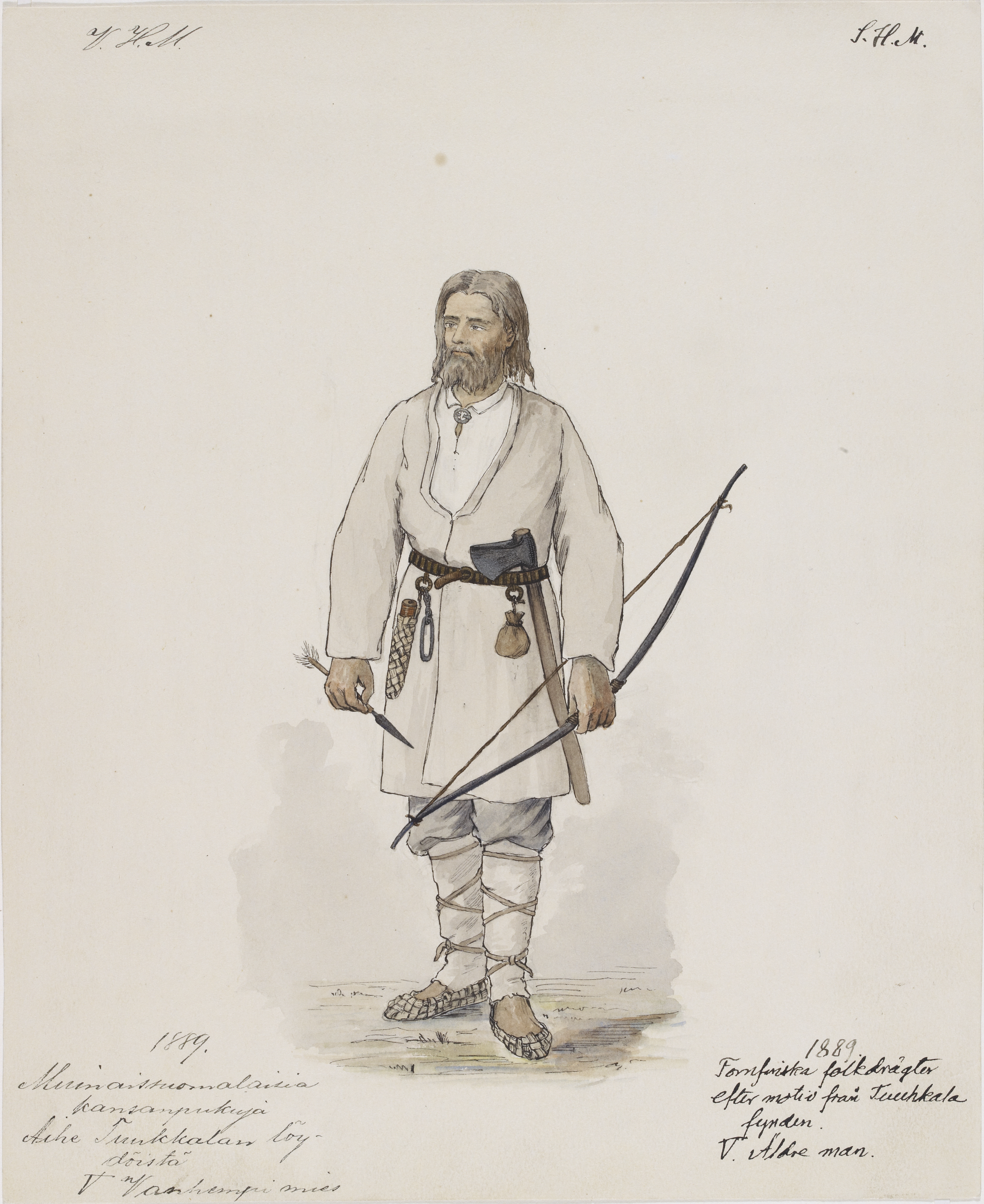
Man's costume during the Iron Age according to the archeological finds from Tuukkala. Interpretation from 1889.

=== Origins ===
As other Western Uralic and Baltic Finnic peoples, Finns originated between the Volga, Oka, and Kama rivers in what is now Russia. The genetic basis of future Finns also emerged in this area. There have been at least two noticeable waves of migration to the west by the ancestors of Finns. They began to move upstream of the Dnieper and from there to the upper reaches of the Daugava, from where they eventually moved along the river towards the Baltic Sea in 1250–1000 BC. The second wave of migration brought the main group of ancestors of Finns from the Baltic Sea to the southwest coast of Finland in the 8th century BC.

During the 80–100 generations of the migration, Finnish language changed its form, although it retained its Finno-Ugric roots. Material culture also changed during the transition, although the Baltic Finnic culture that formed on the shores of the Baltic Sea constantly retained its roots in a way that distinguished it from its neighbors.

Finnish material culture became independent of the wider Baltic Finnic culture in the 6th and 7th centuries, and by the turn of the 8th century the culture of metal objects that prevailed in Finland had developed in its own way. The same era can be considered to be broadly the date of the birth of the independent Finnish language, although its prehistory, like other Baltic Finnic languages, extends far into the past.

=== Language ===
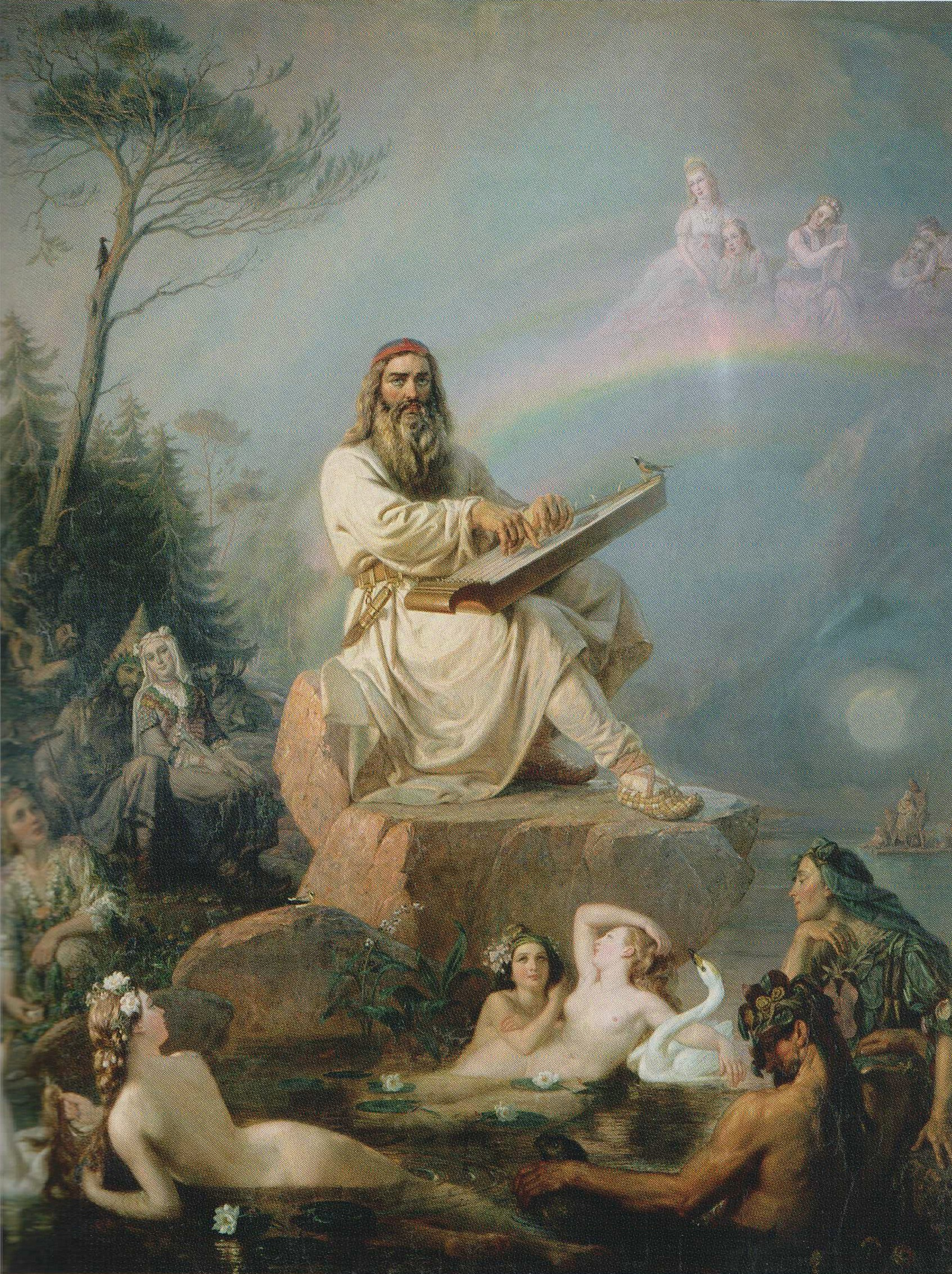
Väinämöisen soitto (Väinämöinen's Play) by R. W. Ekman. The painting is a depiction of Väinämöinen playing the kantele.

Just as uncertain are the possible mediators and the timelines for the development of the Uralic majority language of the Finns. On the basis of comparative linguistics, it has been suggested that the separation of the Finnic and the Sami languages took place during the 2nd millennium BC, and that the Proto-Uralic roots of the entire language group date from about the 6th to the 8th millennium BC. When the Uralic languages were first spoken in the area of contemporary Finland is debated. It is thought that Proto-Finnic (the proto-language of the Finnic languages) was not spoken in modern Finland, because the maximum divergence of the daughter languages occurs in modern-day Estonia. Therefore, Finnish was already a separate language when arriving in Finland. Furthermore, the traditional Finnish lexicon has a large number of words (about one-third) without a known etymology, hinting at the existence of a disappeared Paleo-European language; these include toponyms such as niemi, 'peninsula'. Because the Finnish language itself reached a written form only in the 16th century, little primary data remains of early Finnish life. For example, the origins of such cultural icons as the sauna, and the kantele (an instrument of the zither family) have remained rather obscure.

=== Livelihood ===
Peasants toiling at a slash-and-burn site in Lapinlahti, Eastern Finland.

Agriculture supplemented by fishing and hunting has been the traditional livelihood among Finns. Slash-and-burn agriculture was practiced in the forest-covered east by Eastern Finns up to the 19th century. Agriculture, along with the language, distinguishes Finns from the Sámi, who retained the hunter-gatherer lifestyle longer and moved to coastal fishing and reindeer herding. Following industrialization and modernization of Finland, most Finns were urbanized and employed in modern service and manufacturing occupations, with agriculture becoming a minor employer (see Economy of Finland).

=== Religion ===
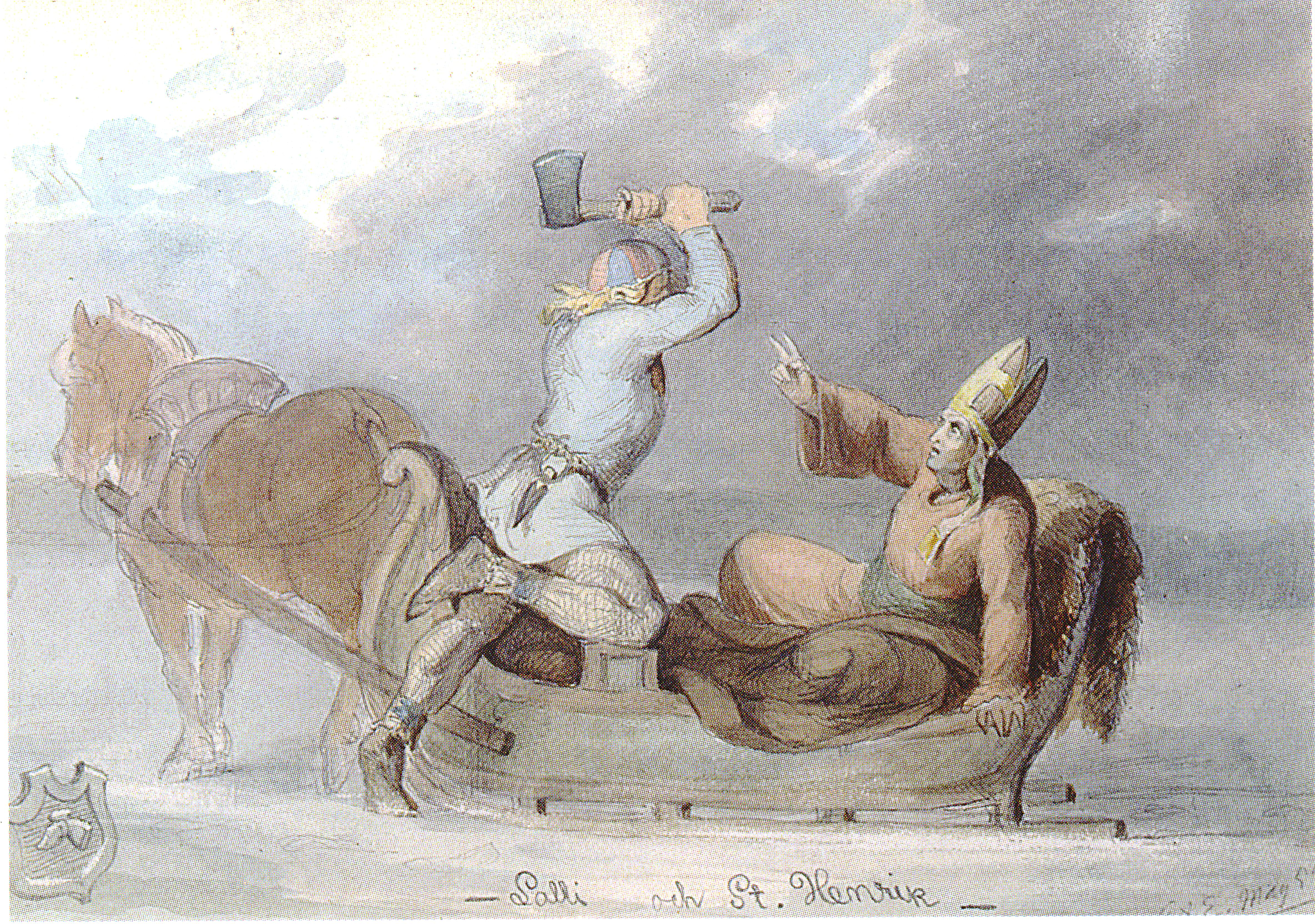
Lalli, an apocryphal character from Finnish history, is one of the earliest known Finns. According to legend, he killed Bishop Henry with an axe on the ice of Lake Köyliö.

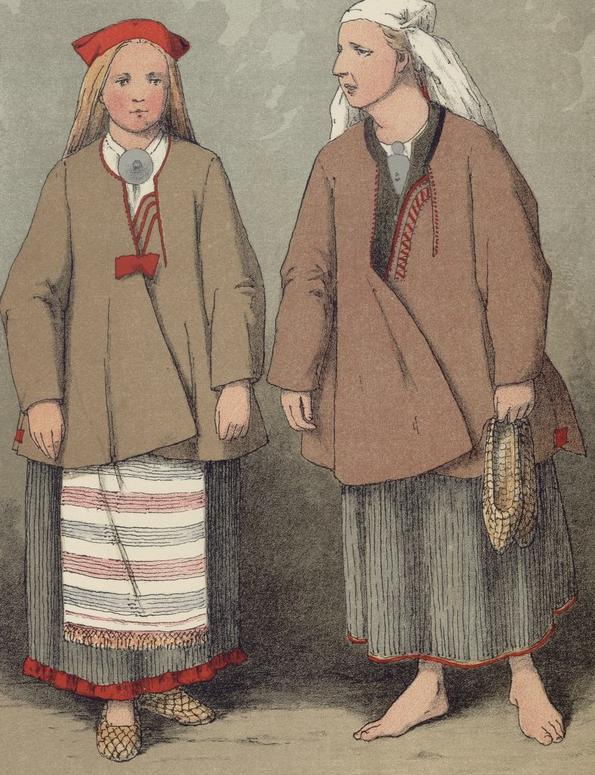
A peasant girl and a woman in traditional dress from Ruokolahti, Eastern Finland, as depicted by Severin Falkman in 1882

Christianity spread to Finland from the Medieval times onward and original native traditions of Finnish paganism have become extinct. Finnish paganism combined various layers of Finnic, Norse, Germanic and Baltic paganism. Finnic Jumala was some sort of sky-god and is shared with Estonia. Belief of a thunder-god, Ukko or Perkele, may have Baltic origins. Elements had their own protectors, such as Ahti for waterways and Tapio for forests. Local animistic deities, haltija, which resemble Scandinavian tomte, were also given offerings to, and bear worship was also known. Finnish neopaganism, or suomenusko, attempts to revive these traditions.

Christianity was introduced to Finns from both the west and the east. Swedish kings conquered western parts of Finland in the late 13th century, imposing Roman Catholicism. Reformation in Sweden had the important effect that bishop Mikael Agricola, a student of Martin Luther's, introduced written Finnish, and literacy became common during the 18th century. When Finland became independent, it was overwhelmingly Lutheran Protestant. A small number of Eastern Orthodox Finns were also included, thus the Finnish government recognized both religions as "national religions". In 2017 70.9% of the population of Finland belonged to the Evangelical Lutheran Church of Finland, 1.1% to the Finnish Orthodox Church, 1.6% to other religious groups and 26.3% had no religious affiliation. Whereas, in Russian Ingria, there were both Lutheran and Orthodox Finns; the former were identified as Ingrian Finns while the latter were considered Izhorians or Karelians.

== Subdivisions ==
Finns are traditionally assumed to originate from two different populations speaking different dialects of Proto-Finnic (kantasuomi). Thus, a division into Western Finnish and Eastern Finnish is made. Further, there are subgroups, traditionally called heimo, according to dialects and local culture. Although ostensibly based on late Iron Age settlement patterns, the heimos have been constructed according to dialect during the rise of nationalism in the 19th century.

- Western
  - Southwest Finland and Satakunta: Finns proper (varsinaissuomalaiset)
  - Tavastia: Tavastians (hämäläiset)
  - Ostrobothnia: Ostrobothnians (pohjalaiset)
    - Southern Ostrobothnians (eteläpohjalaiset)
    - Central Ostrobothnians (keskipohjalaiset)
    - Northern Ostrobothnians (pohjoispohjalaiset)
  - Lapland: Lapland Finns (peräpohjalaiset/lappilaiset)
- Eastern
  - Karelia: Finnish Karelians (karjalaiset); Karelian dialects of Finnish are distinct from the Karelian language spoken in Russia, and most of North Karelia actually speak Savonian dialects
  - Savonia: Savonians (savolaiset)
  - Kainuu: Kainuu Finns (kainuulaiset)
- Finnish minority groups outside Finland
  - Tornedalians (länsipohjalaiset) of Norrbotten, Sweden
  - Forest Finns (metsäsuomalaiset) of Sweden and Norway
  - Kvens (kveenit) of Finnmark, Norway
  - Ingrian Finns (inkerinsuomalaiset) of Ingria, Russia
- Finnish diaspora (ulkosuomalaiset)
  - Sweden Finns (ruotsinsuomalaiset), Finnish minority in Sweden

The historical provinces of Finland can be seen to approximate some of these divisions. The regions of Finland, another remnant of a past governing system, can be seen to reflect a further manifestation of a local identity.

Journalist Ilkka Malmberg toured Finland in 1984 and looked into people's traditional and contemporary understanding of the heimos, listing them as follows: Tavastians (hämäläiset), Ostrobothnians (pohjalaiset), Lapland Finns (lappilaiset), Finns proper (varsinaissuomalaiset), Savonians (savolaiset), Kainuu Finns (kainuulaiset), and Finnish Karelians (karjalaiset).

Today the importance of the tribal (heimo) identity generally depends on the region. It is strongest among the Karelians, Savonians and South Ostrobothnians.

The Sweden Finns are either native to Sweden or have emigrated from Finland to Sweden. An estimated 450,000 first- or second-generation immigrants from Finland live in Sweden, of which approximately half speak Finnish. The majority moved from Finland to Sweden following the Second World War, contributing and taking advantage of the rapidly expanding Swedish economy. This emigration peaked in 1970 and has been declining since. There is also Meänkieli, a language developed in partial isolation from standard Finnish, spoken by three minorities, Tornedalians, Kvens and Lantalaiset, in the border area of northern Sweden. The Finnish language as well as Meänkieli are recognized as official minority languages in Sweden.

== Genetics ==
The use of mitochondrial "mtDNA" (female lineage) and Y-chromosomal "Y-DNA" (male lineage) DNA-markers in tracing back the history of human populations has been gaining ground in ethnographic studies of Finnish people (e.g. the National Geographic Genographic Project and the Suomi DNA-projekti.) The most common maternal haplogroup among Finns is H, as 41.5% of Finnish women belong to it. One in four carry the haplogroup U5. It is estimated to be the oldest major mtDNA haplogroup in Europe and is found in the whole of Europe at a low frequency, but seems to be found in significantly higher levels among Finns, Estonians and the Sami people. The older population of European hunter-gatherers that lived across large parts of Europe before the early farmers appeared are outside the genetic variation of modern populations, but most similar to Finns.

With regard to the Y-chromosome, the most common haplogroups of the Finns is N1c, as it is carried by 58–64 percent of Finnish men. N1c, which is found mainly in a few countries in Europe (Estonia, Finland, Latvia, Lithuania, and Russia), is a subgroup of the haplogroup N distributed across northern Eurasia and suggested to have entered Europe from Siberia. The haplogroup N is typical for Uralic-speaking peoples. Other Y-DNA haplogroups among Finns include I1a (25%), R1a (4.3%), and R1b (3.5%).

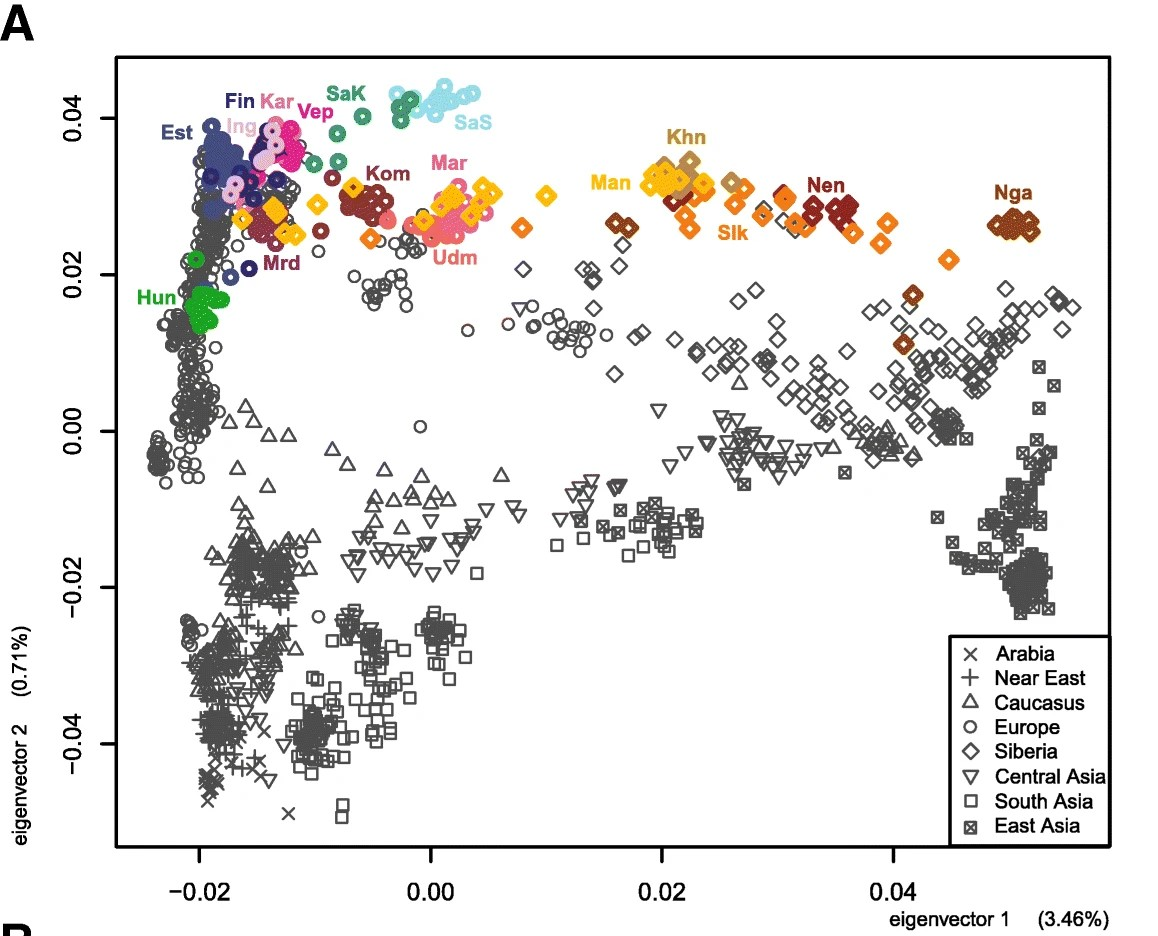
PCA of the Uralic-speaking populations.

Finns are genetically closest to Karelians, a fellow Balto-Finnic group. Finns and Karelians form a cluster with another Balto-Finnic people, the Veps. They show relative affinity to Northern Russians as well, who are known to be at least partially descended from Finno-Ugric-speakers who inhabited Northwestern Russia before the Slavs.

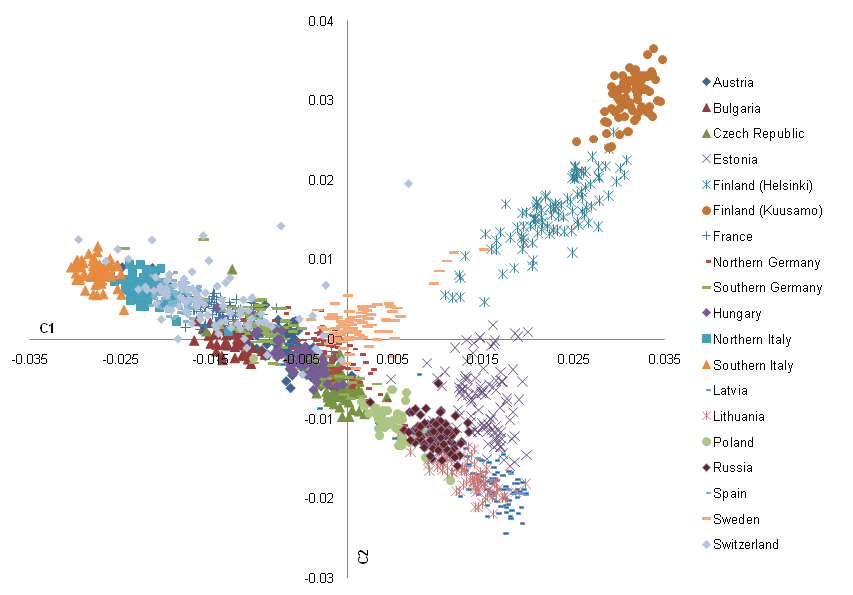
PCA plot of Finns and several other European populations.

When not compared to these groups, Finns have been found to cluster apart from their neighboring populations, forming outlier clusters. They are shifted away from the cline that most Europeans belong to towards geographically distant Uralic-speakers like the Udmurts and Mari (while remaining genetically distant from them as well). In principal component analysis, their distance from Western Europeans is about the same as their distance from Komis. The Balto-Finnic Estonians are among the genetically closest populations of Finns, but they are less isolated from the European cluster than Finns. Swedes, while being distinct from the Finns, are also closer to Finns than most European populations.

Finns being an outlier population has to do with their gene pool having reduced diversity and differences in admixture, including Asian influence, compared to most Europeans. In general, Europeans can be modelled as having three ancestral components (hunter-gatherer, early European farmer and steppe), but this model does not work as such for some northeastern European populations, like the Finns and the Sami. While their genome is still mostly European, they also have some additional East Eurasian ancestry (varies from 5 up to 10–13 % in Finns). This component is most likely Siberian-related, best represented by the north Siberian Nganasans. The specific Siberian-like ancestry is suggested to have arrived in Northern Europe during the early Iron Age, linked to the arrival of Uralic languages. Finns have high steppe or Corded Ware culture-like admixture, and they have less farmer-related and more hunter-gatherer-related admixture than Scandinavians and West and Central Europeans.

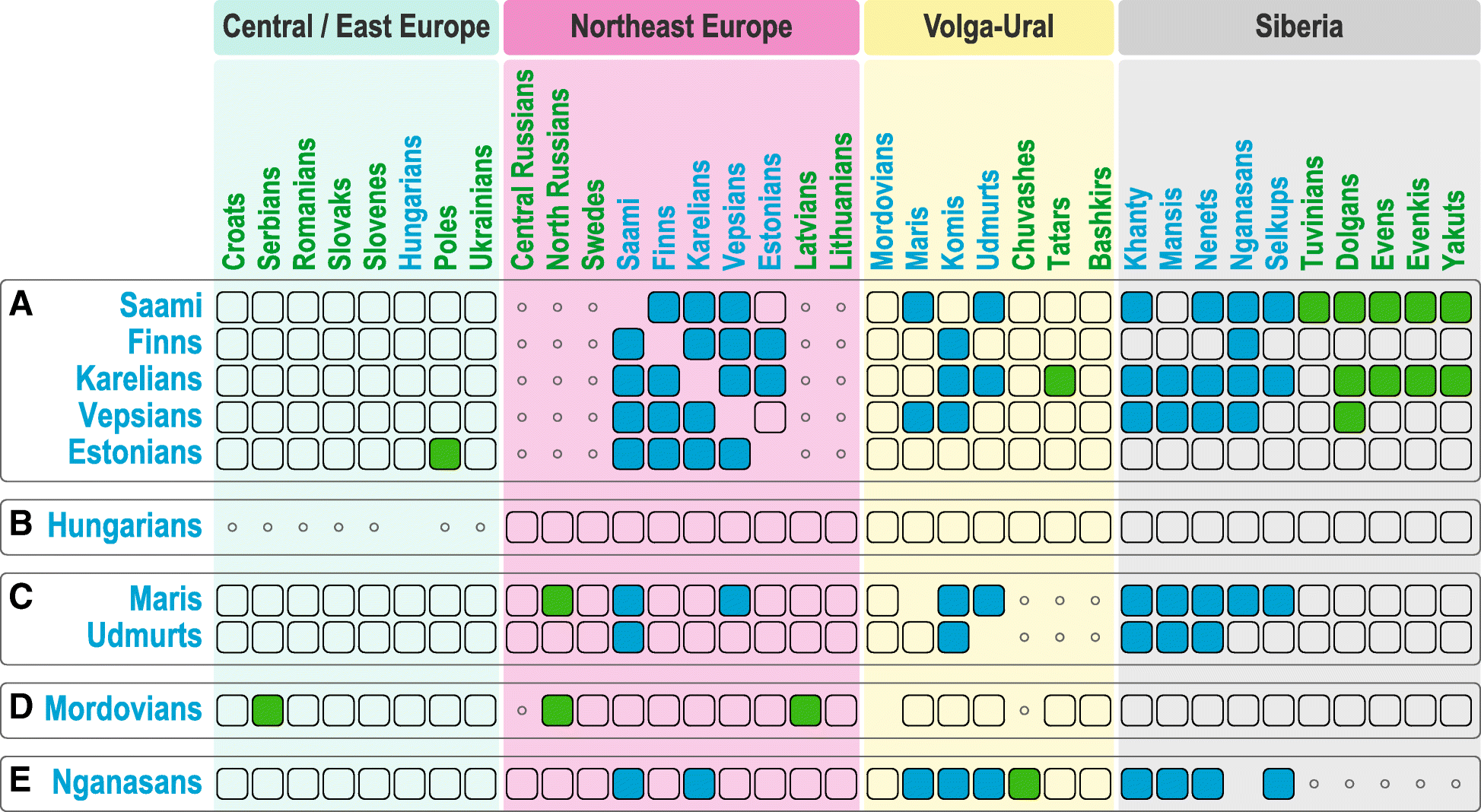
Share of 1–2 cM IBD segments of Uralic speakers.

Finns share more identity-by-descent (IBD) segments with several other Uralic-speaking peoples, including groups like Estonians, the Sami and the geographically distant Komis and Nganasans, than with their Indo-European-speaking neighbours. This is consistent with the idea that the Uralic peoples share common roots to some degree.

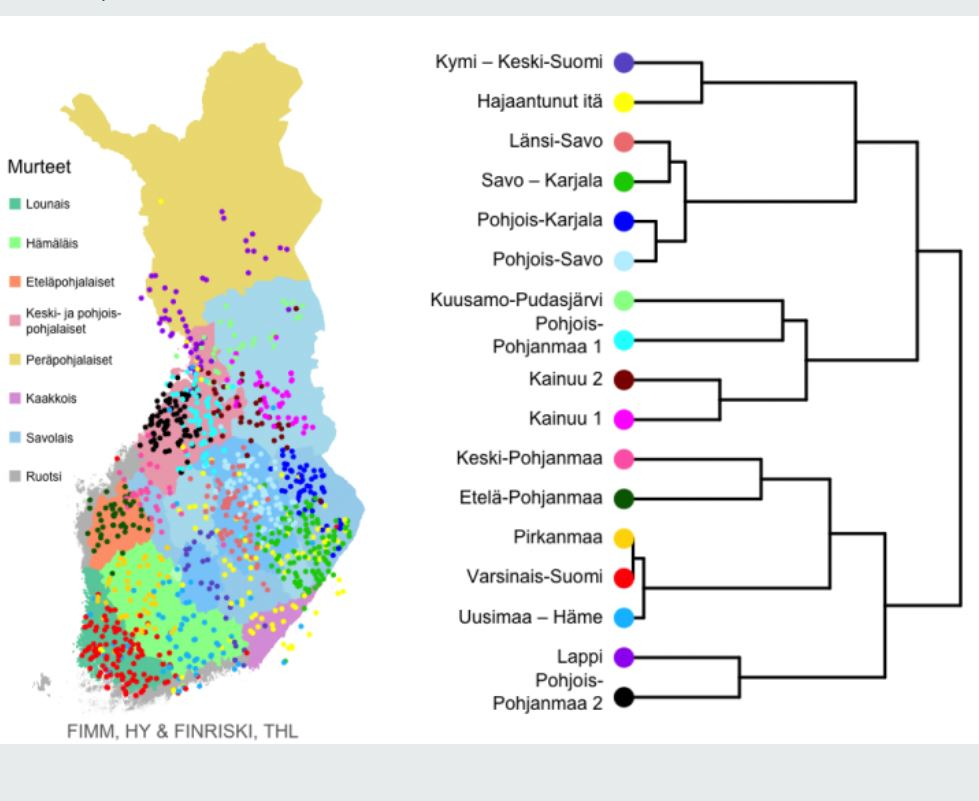
Finland's fine-scale genetic structure before the 1950s.

Finnish genes being often described as homogeneous does not mean that there is no regional variation within Finns. Finns can be roughly divided into Western and Eastern (or Southwestern and Northeastern) Finnish sub-clusters, which in a fine-scale analysis contain more precise clusters that are consistent with traditional dialect areas. When looking at the fixation index (F_{ST}) values, the distance within Finns from different parts of the same country is exceptional in Europe. The distance between Western and Eastern Finns is higher than the distance between many European groups from different countries, such as the British people and Northern Germans. This is also noticeable in the distances of Finns from other Europeans, as the isolation is even more profound in Eastern Finns than in Western Finns. The division is related to the later settlement of Eastern Finland by a small number of Finns, who then experienced separate founder and bottleneck effects and genetic drift. Eastern Finns also have a higher portion of autosomal Siberian admixture and a higher frequency of the Y-haplogroup N1c (71.6%). While N1c is the most common haplogroup in Western Finland as well (53.8%), the haplogroup I1a is found more often there (30.9%) than it is in Eastern and Northern Finland (19%). This suggests that there is an additional Western component in the Western Finnish gene pool. At finer level, haplogroup N1c in Finns shows a division into sub-lineages, with geographical distributions consistent with the southwest-northeast divide, which may indicate that there were separate routes in the population history. Despite the differences, the IBS analysis points out that Western and Eastern Finns share overall a largely similar genetic foundation.

== Theories of the origins of Finns ==
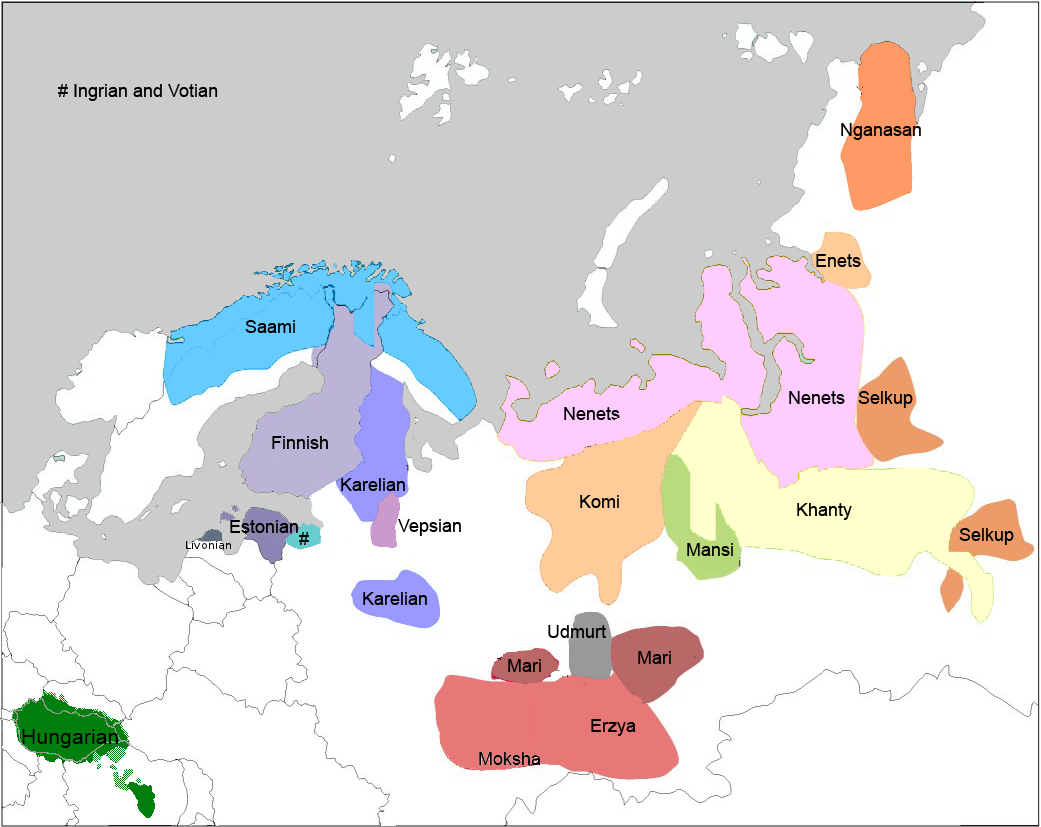
Modern distribution of Uralic languages

In the 19th century, the Finnish researcher Matthias Castrén prevailed with the theory that "the original home of Finns" was in west-central Siberia.

Until the 1970s, most linguists believed that Finns arrived in Finland as late as the first century AD. However, accumulating archaeological data suggests that the area of contemporary Finland had been inhabited continuously since the end of the ice age, contrary to the earlier idea that the area had experienced long uninhabited intervals. The hunter-gatherer Sámi were pushed into the more remote northern regions.

A hugely controversial theory is so-called refugia. This was proposed in the 1990s by Kalevi Wiik, a professor emeritus of phonetics at the University of Turku. According to this theory, Finno-Ugric speakers spread north as the Ice age ended. They populated central and northern Europe, while Basque speakers populated western Europe. As agriculture spread from the southeast into Europe, the Indo-European languages spread among the hunter-gatherers. In this process, both the hunter-gatherers speaking Finno-Ugric and those speaking Basque learned how to cultivate land and became Indo-Europeanized. According to Wiik, this is how the Celtic, Germanic, Slavic, and Baltic languages were formed. The linguistic ancestors of modern Finns did not switch their language due to their isolated location. The main supporters of Wiik's theory are Professor Ago Künnap of the University of Tartu, Professor Kyösti Julku of the University of Oulu and Associate Professor Angela Marcantonio of the University of Rome. Wiik has not presented his theories in peer-reviewed scientific publications. Many scholars in Finno-Ugrian studies have strongly criticized the theory. Professor Raimo Anttila, Petri Kallio and brothers Ante and Aslak Aikio have rejected Wiik's theory with strong words, hinting strongly to pseudoscience, and even alt-right political biases among Wiik's supporters. Moreover, some dismissed the entire idea of refugia, due to the existence even today of arctic and subarctic peoples. The most heated debate took place in the Finnish journal Kaltio during autumn 2002. Since then, the debate has calmed, each side retaining their positions. Genotype analyses across the greater European genetic landscape have provided some credibility to the theory of the Last Glacial Maximum refugia. But this does not in any way corroborate or prove that these 'refugia' spoke Uralic/Finnic, as it belies wholly independent variables that are not necessarily coeval (i.e. language spreads and genetic expansions can occur independently, at different times and in different directions).

== See also ==
- Demographics of Finland
- Finnic (disambiguation)
- Finnish (disambiguation)
- Finnish language
- Finnish Americans
- Finnish Brazilians
- Finnish Canadians
- Finnish Australians
- Finnish immigration to North America
- List of Finns
