= RUH =

Ruh or RUH may refer to:

- Rūḥ, an Arabic word meaning spirit
- Royal United Hospital, in Bath, England
- Royal University Hospital, in Saskatoon, Saskatchewan, Canada
- Ruga language (ISO 639-3: ruh), a moribund Tibeto-Burman language of India
- King Khalid International Airport (IATA: RUH), near Riyadh, Saudi Arabia

== People with the surname ==
- Clem Ruh (1915–1973), American basketball player
- Debra Ruh (born 1958), American activist
- Ernst Ruh (born 1936), Swiss mathematician
- Lucinda Ruh (born 1979), Swiss figure skater
- Philip Ruh (1883–1962), German-Canadian architect and Catholic priest

== See also ==
- RUHS (disambiguation)
