= Finländare =

Swedish-language term for an inhabitant of Finland regardless of language

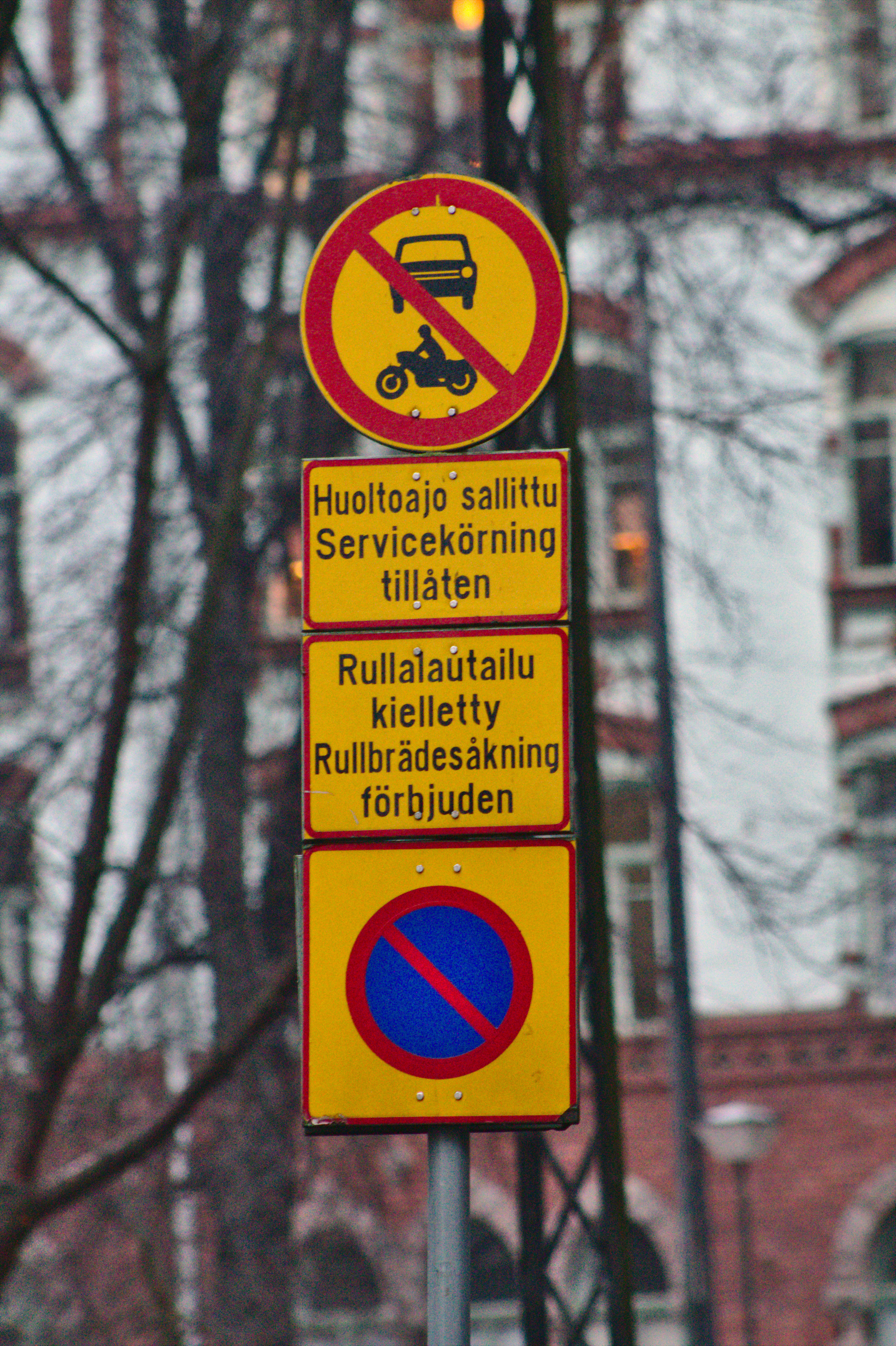
Finnish and Swedish signage in Helsinki. Finland has two national languages. The Swedish term finländare designates the country's inhabitants without reference to which of the two they speak.

Finländare is a Swedish demonym denoting any inhabitant or citizen of Finland irrespective of language or ethnicity. It functions as an umbrella term covering the Finnish- and Swedish-speaking populations of the country alike, and stands in contrast to finne ("Finn"), which denotes a Finnish speaker, and to finlandssvensk ("Finland-Swede"), which denotes a Swedish speaker in Finland. The Finnish language has developed no single word with the same meaning.

The word itself is old: it is attested in Swedish from the Middle Ages and was used fairly frequently in the 17th century to distinguish the eastern part of the Swedish realm from Sweden proper. It became rarer during the 18th century, and for most of the 19th century it remained marginal, even though the clergyman Erik Gustaf Ehrström had set out a systematic case for it as early as 1829. The present-day division of labour between finländare, finne and finlandssvensk was the outcome of a deliberate campaign waged by Swedish-speaking intellectuals in Finland from 1912 onwards. The terms met sustained opposition on the Finnish-speaking side, where critics stressed their Russian derivation and detected a separatist undertone, and they became firmly established only after the Second World War, receiving the endorsement of language authorities in Finland and Sweden between 1946 and 1959.

The similar English word Finlander simply denotes an inhabitant of Finland, but is now largely archaic. In North America Finlander was previously sometimes used as a racist slur towards Finnish immigrants.

== Definition and usage ==
In present-day Swedish usage in Finland the three terms form a system: finländare designates people from Finland irrespective of their language group, finnar those whose mother tongue is Finnish, and finlandssvenskar those finländare whose mother tongue is Swedish.

The same distinction is recommended in Sweden by the Institute for Language and Folklore: finsk and finne apply to the Finnish-speaking part of the population, finlandssvensk to those with Swedish as their mother tongue, and finländsk and finländare to the inhabitants and circumstances of Finland without regard to language. Thus finländsk litteratur — all literature written in Finland, in whichever language — is distinguished from finsk litteratur, literature written in Finnish.

Writing in 1987, the Finland-Swedish linguist Mikael Reuter traced the rejection of the word in some Finnish-speaking circles to the view that it signalled separatism — that the Swedish-speaking minority was using linguistic means to indicate that it belonged to the nation without belonging to the Finnish-speaking majority. He himself saw it as the opposite, a symbol of common belonging: Finland-Swedes belonged, like the Sámi, to a different language group from the finnar, but to the same people, the finländare. The need for the word, he added, was often felt most acutely abroad.

== History ==
=== Before 1809 ===
The expression finländare occurred as early as the Middle Ages and was used fairly frequently during the 17th century, when a distinction was wanted between Sweden west of the Gulf of Bothnia and the eastern part of the realm, Finland. During the 18th century it became less common. Throughout the period in which Finland belonged to Sweden the dominant usage was to call the country's inhabitants finnar ("Finns"); the Swedish-speaking inhabitants of Finland were, in keeping with the usage of the common people, simply called svenskar ("Swedes"). What was meant was the language, and the distinction being drawn generally concerned local or regional conditions in which no further precision was needed.

=== The Grand Duchy and Ehrström's proposal (1829) ===
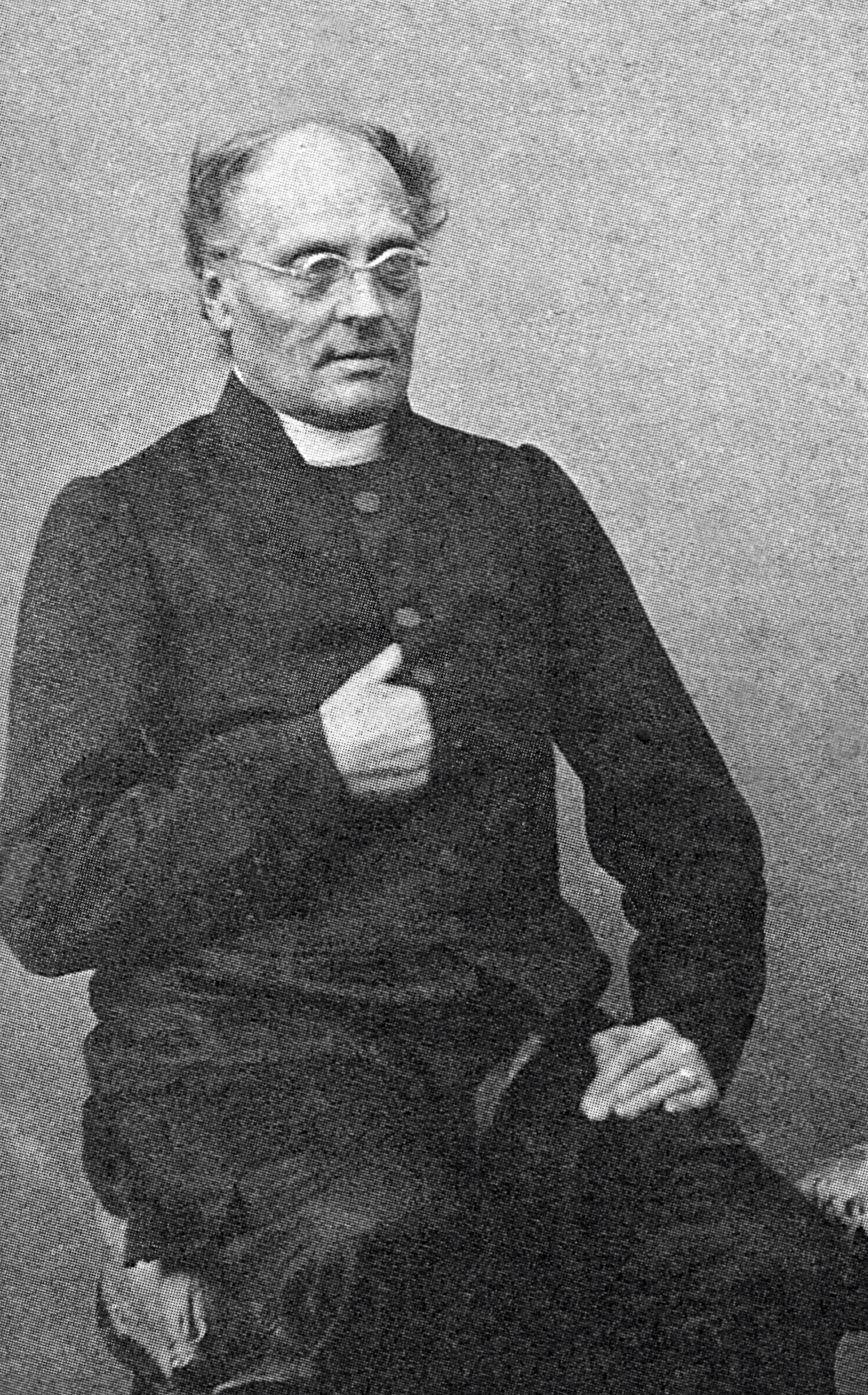
Johan Ludvig Runeberg in 1863. His line "I too am a finne" attests the double meaning the word retained throughout the 19th century.

The situation changed decisively in 1809, when Finland was ceded to the Russian Empire as the autonomous Grand Duchy of Finland, although usage long remained unsettled. The terminology was further complicated by a distinction drawn in Russian administrative practice between finljandskij and finskij: the Russian government offices in Finland and the troops stationed there fell under the former, the domestic troops raised from subjects of the Grand Duchy under the latter. The distinction concerned the area of recruitment, not language. The Passport Expedition was accordingly called Finljandskaja Pasportnaja Expeditsia and the Finnish Cadet Corps Finljandskij Kadetskij Korpus, while the Finnish Economic Society was Finskoje Ekonomitjeskoje Obschtjestvo.

Impulses towards a distinction also came from foreign languages, German in particular. The Swedish translations (1811) of the Pomeranian historian Friedrich Rühs's works on the history of Finland speak — though not consistently — of finländare.

A systematic argument was presented in 1829 by Erik Gustaf Ehrström, vicar of the Swedish parish in Saint Petersburg and himself formerly a zealot for the Finnish language. He pointed out that in that city a distinction was drawn between persons whose mother tongue and language of education was Finnish and persons who, irrespective of language, belonged to Finland by birth and civic right, and proposed that Swedish should do likewise:

Consequently, according to usage here, all the inhabitants of Finland are Finländare, but they are not all Finnar. Persons of rank in general, the majority of town dwellers, and that part of the common people which does not speak Finnish are, according to the same usage, Finländare, though not properly Finnar.

— Erik Gustaf Ehrström, 1829

Ehrström further argued that the designations finländare and finländsk had hitherto been little used in the official language of Finland, but deserved to be used more often, since they gave "greater definiteness and correctness to the expression".

Even so, finne and finsk remained the commonest designations throughout the 19th century, and in their double meaning. When Johan Ludvig Runeberg wrote "I too am a finne" in The Tales of Ensign Stål, this was not a linguistic or ethnic profession of faith but an assertion of solidarity with the inhabitants of the Grand Duchy.

=== The nineteenth-century debate ===
The debate over the two nationalities of Finland created a need for two new expressions: an umbrella term covering both the Finnish and the Swedish nationality, and a separate designation for the latter. For the Finnish speakers the word finne already existed.

As early as 1855 the Swedish publicist August Sohlman held the usage finsk to be misleading: that the same word should denote both a nationality extending far beyond Finland's borders and any inhabitant whatever of the Grand Duchy was, in his view, the ground on which the Fennomans based their claims about a single grand-ducal nationality, whereas Finland had from ancient times possessed two nationalities. In 1860 Axel Olof Freudenthal took the same position in the handwritten student paper Nylands Dragon: if one accepted, with J. V. Snellman, language as the expression of nationality, then Swedish speakers could not be called "Finns" in the national sense, but were "Swedes from the former province of Finland" who together with the Finns proper made up the finländska people. Neither statement met with much response at first; finländsk had been unlucky from the outset in acquiring a party-political flavour.

Over the following decades the word appeared only sporadically. It was not used by the paper Vikingen, but occurred around 1880 in Folkwännen. In the autumn of 1881 a polemic arose between Swedish- and Finnish-language papers, in which Östra Nyland predicted in a long editorial that finländare would soon come into general use. The word won a partial victory when the Verdandi society used it in the title of the first number of its series of publications in 1882; the title was abandoned in the next number. Feelings ran high: Ernst Lagus considered it "a deliberately false interpretation of Runeberg's words" to designate all inhabitants of Finland as Finns.

In the 1880s only the avowed champions of Swedish (see Svecomans) used the expression, and the leading figures of that circle, among them Axel Lille and Carl Gustaf Estlander, thought it unlikely that terms they themselves held to be correct would gain ground. Estlander was among the founders of Finsk Tidskrift, where he later argued for the use of finländsk. In the 1890s the term did become established in linguistic terminology, with the appearance in 1894 of the series Finländska bidrag till svensk språk- och folklivsforskning; as a designation for the Swedish dialects spoken in Finland, however, östsvensk ("East Swedish") long remained in parallel use. During the years of oppression at the end of the 1890s and the beginning of the 20th century the debate largely lay dormant, and the question was not so much as mentioned in the Swedish People's Party programme of 1906.

=== Breakthrough in the 1910s ===
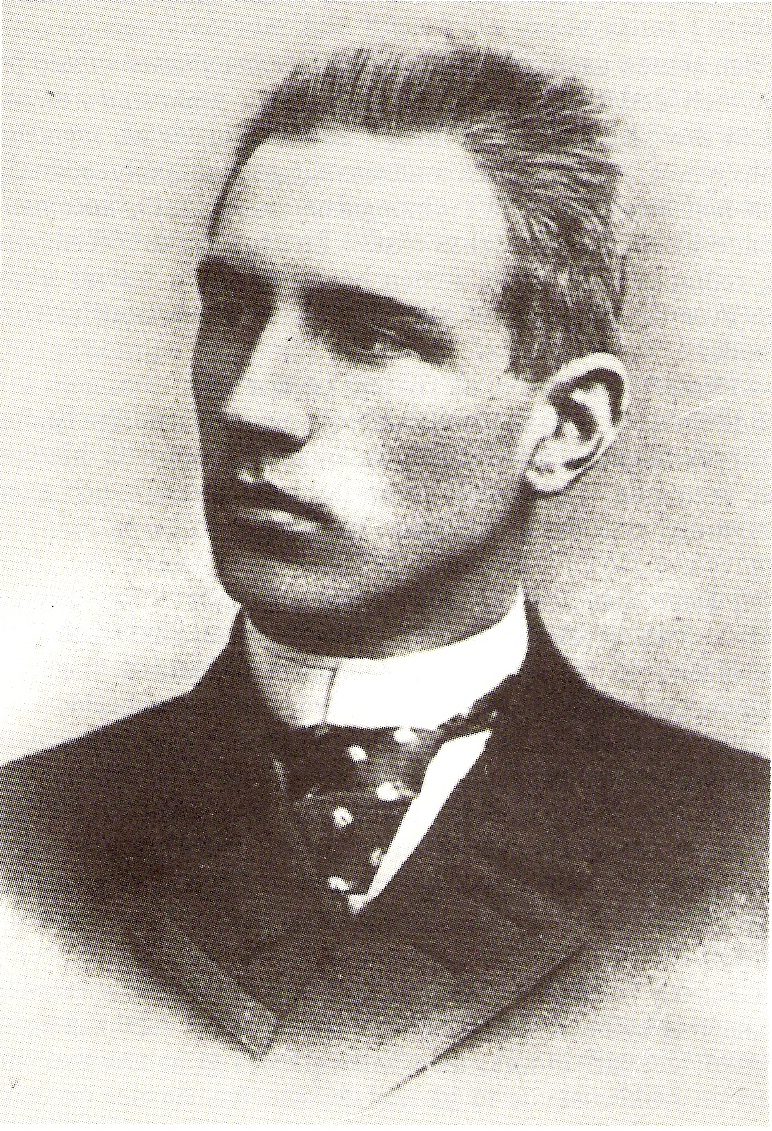
The writer Arvid Mörne was among the most active advocates of the term finländare in the 1910s.

The fiercest struggle over the terms was fought in the years immediately before the First World War. The debate opened early in 1912 in the magazine Studentbladet and ran for two years, with contributions from Artur Eklund, Arvid Mörne, the linguist Rolf Pipping, P. O. von Törne and Hugo J. Ekholm (Ekhammar), among others. The majority of those who spoke favoured the terms finlänning and finländsk. Ekholm was the driving force behind a general meeting of Swedish-speaking students which in April 1913 agreed on the following resolution:

The Swedish students of Finland, having for their part resolved to use the words finlänning (or finländare) and finländsk instead of finne and finsk as a political designation for all citizens of Finland irrespective of their language and nationality, hereby permit themselves to call upon the Swedish newspapermen of Finland to join in the same linguistic reform, so that the public may thereby be influenced and the change gain the widest possible currency.

— Student resolution, April 1913

In the summer of 1913 the students' initiative was supported by the assembly of delegates of the Swedish-language youth associations of Finland. The society Arbetets Vänner had promoted the terms since 1912 and in 1916 appealed to the newspapers of Sweden to adopt them; in parallel, the form finlänning was tried out. The reception was mixed: Hufvudstadsbladet in Finland adopted the terms in 1916, as did Svenska Dagbladet in Sweden, while other papers declined. Writers such as Arvid Mörne, K. Rob. V. Wikman and G. G. Rosenqvist went on arguing for them, but it was not until the mid-1920s that they broke through on a broader front. In the hardening language climate the Swedish-speaking social democrats adopted them, and the Swedish People's Party came out unanimously in their support at its party congress in 1926.

=== Relation to finlandssvensk ===
The designation finlandssvensk was in a sense a logical consequence of the umbrella term, which needed at least two subcategories in order to be meaningful. The discussion about what the Swedish speakers of Finland should be called nevertheless got under way later, and was conducted with greater intensity in parallel with the main debate over finländare in 1912–1913. The term aroused nothing like the same passions as finländare, one explanation being that svensk could be used in most contexts without giving rise to mistaken associations with the kingdom of Sweden. The first to use finlandssvensk and rikssvensk consistently was Eirik Hornborg in his pamphlet Svensk nationalitet i Finland (1914). The first all-Swedish ting in Gothenburg in 1923 laid down that finlandssvensk was the correct designation for the Swedish-speaking population and culture of Finland, and recommended that the press adopt it.

== Finnish-language opposition ==
On the Finnish-speaking side, attempts to establish the general use of finländare met with opposition that was compact from the very beginning. After the Swedish People's Party resolution of 1926, Lauri Ingman directed the National Board of Schools (skolstyrelsen) that textbooks in which finländare and finländsk were used as a designation for all citizens of Finland were not to be approved as teaching materials in state or state-subsidised schools — a step that provoked sharp criticism on the Swedish side.

Many Finnish-speaking participants in the debate stressed the Russian origin of the term and the fact that no corresponding word existed in Finnish or was needed there. It was of course true that the distinction expressed by these designations was not explicitly required within Finland in every context, even if it increased clarity.

The opposition persisted until after the Second World War. In December 1944 a language peace committee submitted its report to the government; its general message was that language questions should be handled generously and to the advantage of the Swedish-speaking minority. The deliberations had nonetheless been intense. The committee's chairman, Kyösti Haataja, wished with the support of the Finnish-speaking members to eliminate the designations finländare and finlandssvenskar from usage, and held moreover that the Swedish Assembly of Finland (Folktinget) ought to be dissolved. The committee put its position as follows:

Since the aversion to the word finländare among Finnish speakers is so strong that the matter cannot be settled in a satisfactory manner without the word being excluded from usage altogether, the committee has been agreed that on the Swedish-speaking side the use of this word should be abandoned.

— Language peace committee, 1945

Neither proposal was carried out. The principle that what one dislikes ought to be forbidden was not accepted on the Swedish-speaking side, and the use of finländare and finländsk became more general and less controversial with time. In 1946 the Swedish Assembly of Finland formally endorsed the designations, followed in 1956 by the Swedish language planning board (Nämnden för svensk språkvård) and in 1959 by the Swedish Academy. The terms finländare and finlandssvensk became firmly established only after the Second World War, and the Assembly continues to exist.

== Absence of an equivalent in Finnish ==
Finnish has developed no comparable term, and suomalainen covers linguistic and ethnic belonging as well as nationality and citizenship alike.

Finnish has nevertheless created such a distinction on occasion. This was the case in Ingria, where it was important to distinguish between two kinds of Finns: those who had settled there from the 17th century onwards and had been Russian subjects since 1703/1721, and those who had migrated after 1809 and remained subjects of the Grand Duchy. The Finnish-speaking Ingrians created the needed term themselves — in a Russian-speaking environment, to be sure, but entirely on their own and in Finnish: the subjects of the Grand Duchy were called suomenmaakkoset (sometimes suomenalamaiset or suomenkansalaiset).

In September 2000 the Social Democratic member of parliament Liisa Jaakonsaari, concerned with the integration of immigrants into Finnish society, raised at the Finnish parliament's question time the word suomenmaalainen, proposed in a doctoral dissertation, as a designation that might be applied to immigrants. She put the question to Prime Minister Paavo Lipponen.

== The English word Finlander ==
English has a similar-looking noun, Finlander. Webster's Revised Unabridged Dictionary (1913) records it simply as "a native or inhabitant of Finland", without the distinction by language that the Swedish term carries.

In North America the word was applied to Finnish immigrants and took on a pejorative sense, being used as an ethnic slur alongside "China Swede" and "roundhead". According to the historian Marianne Wargelin it "became a derisive term of both ethnic and racial prejudice", bound up with a nineteenth-century belief that Finns were of Asian rather than European descent. That belief had practical consequences: in 1908 federal authorities sought to deny citizenship to sixteen Finnish men on that basis, though a judge in Duluth ruled in their favour.

As an example of literary use, author Henry David Thoreau uses the word Finlander in his 1843 essay "A Winter Walk". Thoreau uses the term in a simile comparing a New England ice fisherman to a Finlander.

== Related terms in Sweden ==
Emigration from Finland to Sweden, at its height in the 1960s and 1970s, gave rise to a corresponding system of terms on the western side of the Gulf of Bothnia. Inhabitants of Sweden whose mother tongue is Finnish are called sverigefinnar; where all persons of Finnish origin in Sweden are meant, whatever their mother tongue, the term sverigefinländare is used. Those of Swedish mother tongue from Finland form a third group, the sverigefinlandssvenskar, about a quarter of the sverigefinländare.

The emigrants included Finnish and Swedish speakers alike. Most settled in the Stockholm region and Mälardalen and around Gothenburg; at the beginning of the 1980s the sverigefinländare made up some 6 per cent of the 1.5 million inhabitants of the Swedish capital. For 2020 the number of people with some form of connection to Finland as first-, second- or third-generation sverigefinländare was estimated at about 700,000.

The groups are not equal in law: the sverigefinnar have been recognised since 2000 as one of the national minorities of Sweden, whereas the sverigefinlandssvenskar have not, since they speak the language of the majority. In 2010 a Finnish administrative area was established, in whose participating municipalities inhabitants can obtain services in Finnish.

== See also ==
- Ethnonym
- Swedish-speaking population of Finland
- Languages of Finland
- Svenskfinland
- Sweden Finns
- Finnish Americans
- Anti-Finnish sentiment

== Sources ==
- Engman, Max (2016). Språkfrågan: Finlandssvenskhetens uppkomst 1812–1922 (PDF). Finlands svenska historia (in Swedish). Vol. 3. Skrifter utgivna av Svenska litteratursällskapet i Finland 702:3. Helsingfors & Stockholm: Svenska litteratursällskapet i Finland & Atlantis. ISBN 978-951-583-354-9.
- Hårdstedt, Martin (2023). Finlands svenska historia (PDF). Skrifter utgivna av Svenska litteratursällskapet i Finland (in Swedish). Vol. 869. Helsingfors & Stockholm: Svenska litteratursällskapet i Finland & Natur och Kultur. ISBN 978-951-583-577-2.
