= RUHS =

Ruhs or RUHS may refer to:

- Rajasthan University of Health Sciences, a state university in Jaipur, Rajasthan, India
- Redford Union High School, Redford, Michigan, United States
- Redondo Union High School, Redondo Beach, California, United States

== People ==
- Friedrich Rühs (1781–1820), German historian
- Kris Ruhs (born 1952), American painter and sculptor
- Michael Ruhs (born 2002), Australian soccer player

== See also ==
- RUH (disambiguation)
