= Finnish diaspora =

Finnish people and their descendants

Map of the Finnish diaspora in the world (includes people with Finnish ancestry or citizenship). Finland + 100,000 + 10,000 + 1,000

The Finnish diaspora consists of Finnish emigrants and their descendants, especially those who maintain some of the customs of their Finnish culture. The largest movement was the Great Migration, in which around 350,000 Finns emigrated to North America between 1870 and 1930.

== The Great Migration ==
Finns have emigrated to many countries, including the United Kingdom, the United States, France, Canada, Australia, Argentina, New Zealand, Sweden, Norway, Russia, Germany, Israel and Brazil. The years between 1870 and 1930 are sometimes referred to as the "Great Migration" of Finns into North America. The "America fever" took hold in Southern Ostrobothnia in western Finland during the 1870s and grew into a mass movement in the following decade, with about 21,000 Finns emigrating overseas by 1887. In the 1870s, professional recruiters, or "agents", travelled through northern Finland seeking labour for the mines of northern Michigan, which became a major destination for Finnish migrants. Most Finnish emigrants came from western Finland, about half from the province of Vaasa; in all, around 350,000 Finns emigrated to North America between 1870 and 1929, the great majority to the United States.

Most of the migrants settled in the United States. Recruitment of mine labour made the Upper Peninsula of Michigan an early centre of Finnish settlement. Communities also grew at Duluth, known as the "Helsinki of America", in Brooklyn's "Finntown" in New York City, where about 10,000 Finns lived, and in California, Oregon and Washington. Emigrants reached the United States through the ports of New York, Boston, Baltimore, Philadelphia and Portland, and Canada through Halifax, Quebec, Montreal and Saint John. During the 1920s the movement shifted towards Canada, where almost 34,000 Finns arrived, and to Australia.

Finnish Americans established institutions to maintain their culture. The first Finnish-language newspaper in the United States, Amerikan Suomalainen Lehti, appeared in 1876, and the fraternal Knights of Kaleva were founded in 1898. The Order of Runeberg, established in 1920, served the Finland-Swedish American population, which numbered about 70,000.

== Gallery ==
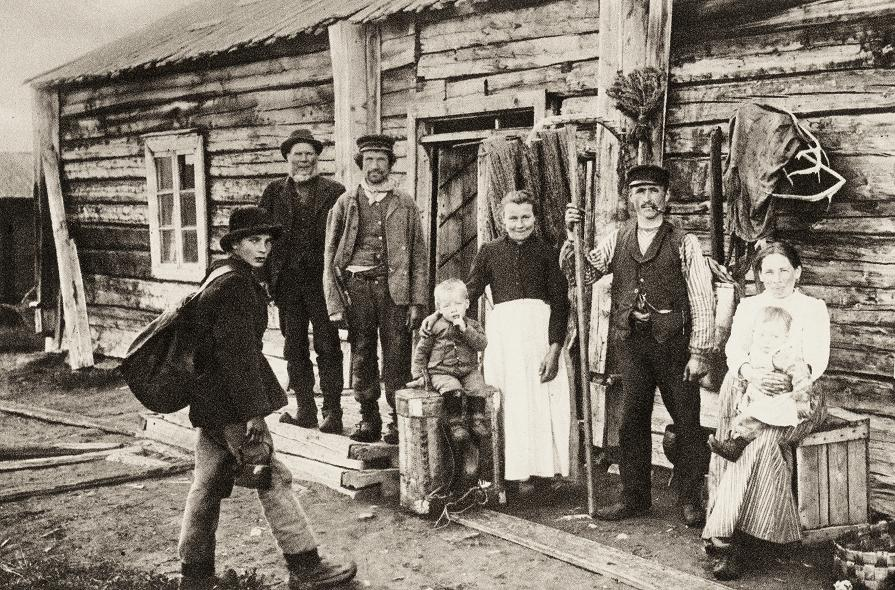
Kven people in Sweden. The picture was published in 1926.

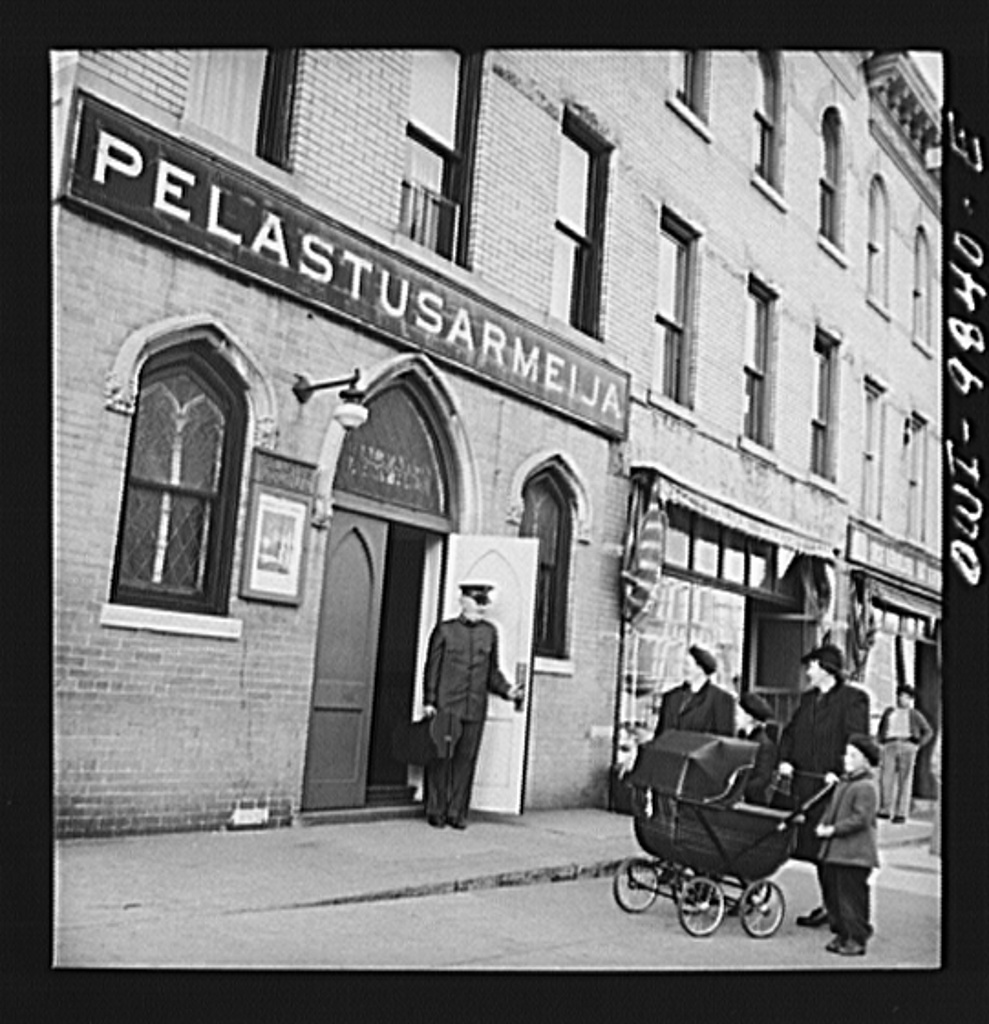
Finnish branch of the Salvation Army in New York's Finntown in 1942.

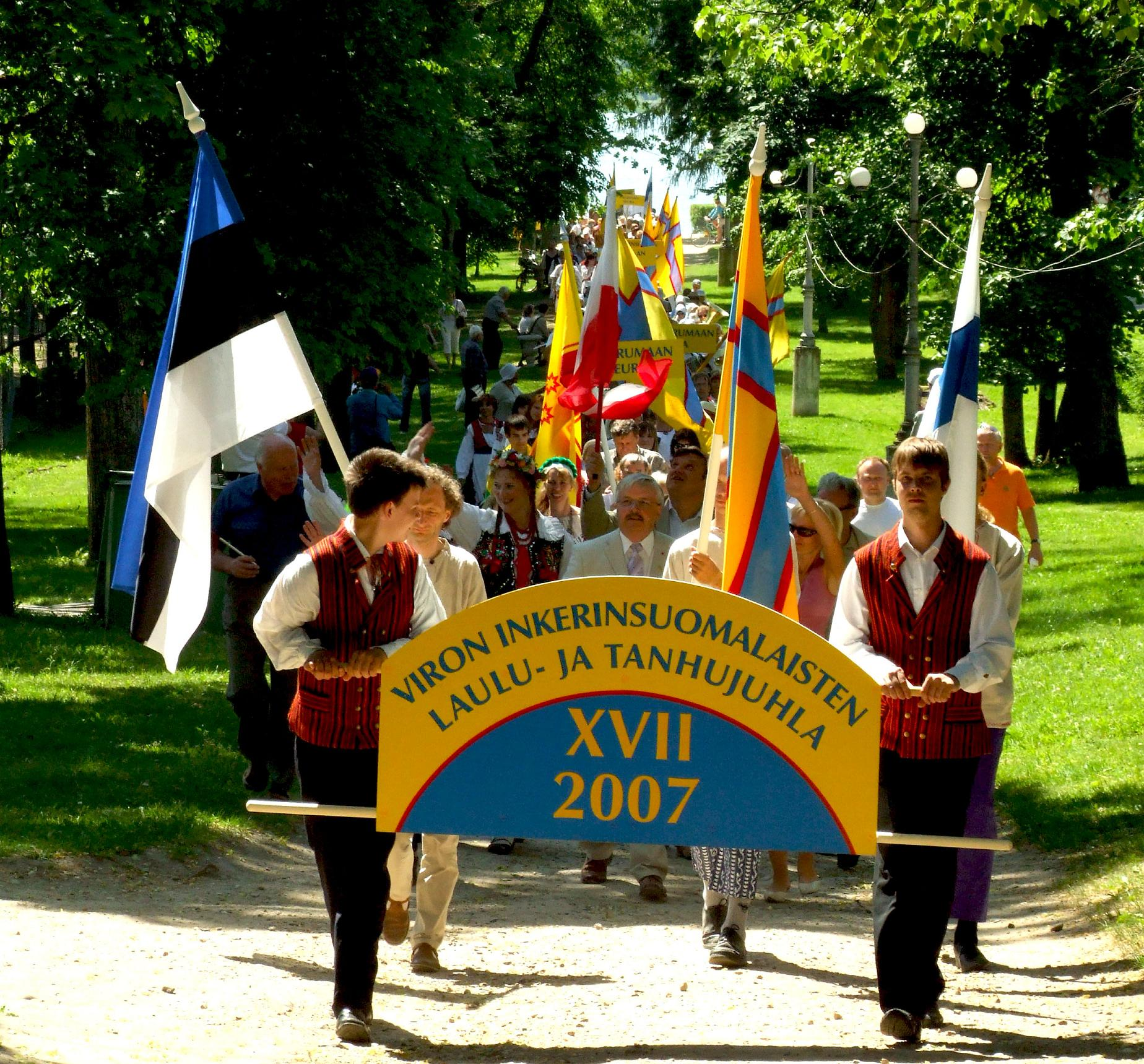
Song and Dance Festival parade of Ingrian Finns in Estonia in 2007.
