= TecAccess =

TecAccess is an American firm located in Rockville, Virginia, that designs online learning tools and websites for people with disabilities. The company offers consulting services, software development, testing and assessment, training, auditing, certification, and policy review. It focuses on Section 508 compliance and IT accessibility for public and private organizations.

== History ==
In 2001, Debra Ruh founded TecAccess (also known as Strategic Performance Solutions). The business grew after Section 508 of the Rehabilitation Act Amendments of 1998, that took effect June 21, 2001, required that people with disabilities have accessible telecommunications, websites, and computer equipmend.

TecAccess was hired in 2003 by Canon to make photocopiers accessible for people who cannot use their arms or are blind; they devised a voice-recognition feature in the ImageRunner series. These photocopiers won an award from the American Foundation for the Blind in 2007. In October 2005, TecAccess was one of the recipients of the United States Department of Labor's New Freedom Initiative Award.

In 2006, the company had $2.5 million in sales to governmental agencies and businesses. Its clients have included the Department of Education, the Internal Revenue Service, Hewlett-Packard, and the Patent and Trademark Office. The organization is located in Rockville, Virginia, but many of the workers telecommute. In 2006, there were 25 employees and 60 associates.) 80% of the workers have a disability, and perform their jobs by using adaptive technology.

TecAccess merged with SSB BART Group in 2011. Ruh was made chief marketing officer of SSB and remained CEO of TecAccess, which operates as a separate entity. In 2016, the CEO of TecAccess was Rich Belyea and Ruh was president.
