= Finnic =

Finnic or Fennic may refer to:

- Finnic culture (disambiguation)
- Finno-Permic languages, Finnic languages in the wider sense
  - Finnic languages in the narrower sense, i.e. the Baltic Finnic languages
- Finnic peoples in the wider sense, i.e. Finno-Permic-speaking peoples
  - Baltic Finnic peoples, the Finnic peoples historically inhabiting the Baltic region
  - Volga Finns, the Finnic peoples historically inhabiting the Vogal basin
- Finnic mythologies, the mythologies of the various Finnic peoples
  - Baltic Finnic paganism, Finnic mythology in the narrower sense
