= Ernst Ruh =

Swiss mathematician

Ernst Alfred Ruh (born 23 February 1936) is a Swiss mathematician, specializing in differential geometry.

Ernst Ruh received his doctorate in 1964 from Brown University under Katsumi Nomizu with thesis On the Automorphism Groups of a G-structure. He is a professor at Ohio State University and a professor of computer science at the University of Basel (1987/89). In 1990 Ruh became a full professor (professor ordinarius) of mathematics at the University of Fribourg; he was the successor of Josef Schmid. He retired in 2006 as professor emeritus.

His name is attached to the Gromov-Ruh theorem. He was an invited speaker at the International Congress of Mathematicians at Berkeley in 1986. He became a fellow of the American Mathematical Society in 2012.

== Selected publications ==
- with Jaak Vilms: Ruh, Ernst A.; Vilms, Jaak (1970). "The tension field of the Gauss map". Trans. Amer. Math. Soc. 149 (2): 569–573. doi:10.1090/s0002-9947-1970-0259768-5. MR 0259768.
- Ruh, Ernst A. (1971). "Curvature and differentiable structure of spheres". Bull. Amer. Math. Soc. 77: 148–150. doi:10.1090/s0002-9904-1971-12640-x. MR 0270307.
- Ruh, Ernst A. (1971). "Minimal immersions of 2-spheres in S^{4} ". Proc. Amer. Math. Soc. 28: 219–222. doi:10.1090/s0002-9939-1971-0271880-x. MR 0271880.
- with Karsten Grove and Hermann Karcher: Grove, Karsten; Karcher, Hermann; Ruh, Ernst A. (1975). "Group actions and curvature" (PDF). Bull. Amer. Math. Soc. 81: 89–92. doi:10.1090/s0002-9904-1975-13647-0. MR 0367862.
