= Debra Ruh =

American businesswoman (born 1958)

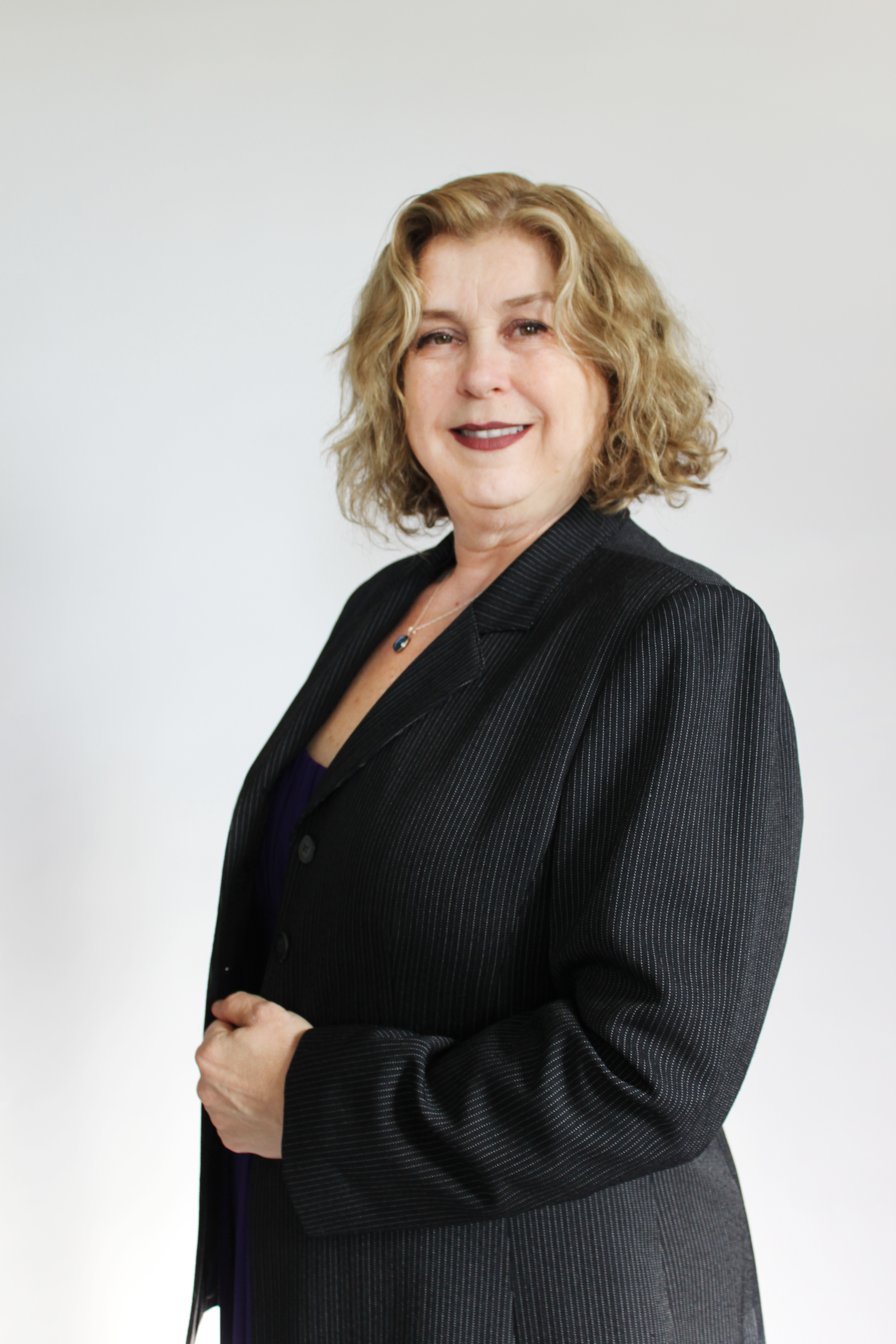
- Born: 1958 (age 67–68); Pensacola, Florida
- Occupations: Businesswoman, advocate, writer, speaker, Digital Accessibility Technologist
- Years active: 1994–present
- Organization(s): TecAccess, LLC, Ruh Global Communications, AXSChat

Debra Ruh (born 1958) is an American business woman and advocate for the rights of persons with disabilities. She founded TecAccess, which provides software and services for information technology accessibility for people with disabilities and for Section 508 compliance. She is also co-founder and Executive Chair of Billion Strong, an initiative related to disability inclusion.

Ruh is Chair of the United Nations's G3ict EmployAbility Task Force that supports information and communication assistive technologies and has assessed 104 countries regarding the implementation of the Convention on the Rights of Persons with Disabilities.

Ruh work has addressed disability inclusion, digital accessibility, assistive technology, and employment practices. She has worked with corporations, governments, and nonprofit organizations on accessibility-related projects.

== Career ==
=== Early career ===
In 1994, Ruh was hired by SunTrust Mortgage, now Crestar Bank, and worked into 1998 as vice president of training, development and quality control. Beginning in 1998, she worked as a banking consultant until 2001, and was at Market Street Mortgage in Tampa, Florida as vice president and distance-learning dean until 2000. She started Strategic Performance Solutions and was its chief executive officer (CEO) from 1999 to 2001.

Ruh early career focused on financial services, including workforce training, organizational development, and technology-based learning systems.

Her focus on disability inclusion was influenced by personal experiences as the mother of a daughter with Down syndrome.

=== TecAccess ===
In 2001, Ruh founded TecAccess, a firm that designs online learning tools and websites for people with disabilities. It received a United States Department of Labor's New Freedom Initiative Award. (Note: In 2005, she was on a "Disability News and Views" radio program with Roy Grizzard, the assistant secretary of the U.S. Department of Labor's Office of Disability Employment Policy. They discussed employment issues for the disabled and adaptive technology.) That year, Ruh received the "Rising Star" award from the National Association of Women Business Owners. (Note: She also received an award for Social Responsibility from the American-China Foundation in 2005.)

=== Other activities ===
In 2013, Ruh started Ruh Global Communications, which focuses on strategic communications and digital marketing. The firm develops solutions for people with disabilities and helps governments implement the United Nations Convention on the Rights of Persons with Disabilities (UNCRPD).

Ruh co-founded a social media venture – AXSChat (access chat) with Neil Milliken and Antonio Santos. It is a social media site about providing access and inclusion to those with accessibility needs. It was an event partner for the Paralympic Games in 2016. Ruh has also been associated with initiatives such as Human Potential at Work, which addresses employment practices involving persons with disabilities.

Ruh was coauthor of the article Helping Veterans with Disabilities Transition to Employment" with Paul Spicer and Kathleen Vaughan in a 2009 issue of Journal of Postsecondary Education and Disability.

=== United Nations and international engagement ===
Ruh has participated in efforts to assess national progress in implementing the Convention on the Rights of Persons with Disabilities. These activities have included reviewing accessibility infrastructure, assistive technology availability, and employment-related policies.

Ruh has taken part in international forums and events related to accessibility and employment, including discussions involving government and policy institutions.

=== Publications ===
2018 – Inclusion Branding: Revealing Secrets to Maximize ROI.

2016 – Tapping into Hidden Human Capital: How Leading Global Companies Improve their Bottom Line by Employing Persons with Disabilities. As of 2016,

2013 – Find Your Voice using Social Media: Learn 101 Social Media Tips for Social Good

2009 White Paper – "Information Technology Accessibility: Yes We Can!" and her brochure "Making the World of Technology Accessible" are on the White House website. They are two of about fifty posted documents in the Open Government Initiative.

== Personal life ==
Ruh was born December 18, 1958, in Pensacola, Florida. She is married to Edward Ruh and has a son and a daughter. Edward, who worked in an IT department of a bank, joined TecAccess in 2006 and worked there for one year. He returned to TecAccess in 2008 and managed relationships with clients. Their working relationship featured in The Wall Street Journal article, "Married to the Job (And Each Other)" in 2011.
