= Artur Eklund =

Finland-Swedish journalist, sports philosopher and activist (1880–1927)

- Born: 21 February 1880; Jakobstad, Grand Duchy of Finland
- Died: 18 August 1927 (aged 47); Jakobstad, Finland
- Occupations: Journalist, sports philosopher, fencing master
- Known for: Coining the term finlandssvensk; sports philosophy; Jäger movement
- Political party: Swedish People's Party of Finland
- Spouse: Rosa Matilda Roos (m. 1911)

Artur Eklund (21 February 1880 – 18 August 1927) was a Finland Swede journalist, sports philosopher and political activist. He is remembered for his role in coining the term finlandssvensk as the first editor of Studentbladet in 1911–1912, for his influential essays on the philosophy of sport, and for his active role in the Jäger movement and Finland's independence movement. During the Finnish Civil War in 1918 he was the first to publicly propose a monarchy for Finland. He served as a Member of Parliament for the Swedish People's Party of Finland from 1919 to 1922.

== Biography ==
=== Early life and education ===
Eklund was born in Jakobstad into a large family. His parents were Lorentz Fredrik Eklund, a teacher at a school for the deaf, and Elise Amanda Wiklund. He attended the Swedish lyceum in Oulu and passed his matriculation examination in 1898 with outstanding marks. He chose aesthetics and modern literature as his main subject at the University of Helsinki, with Sanskrit and comparative linguistics among his minor subjects.

=== Sports journalist and fencing master ===
In 1905 Eklund was appointed assistant fencing master at the University of Helsinki, a post he held until 1927 when he succeeded his mentor as fencing master. He built a reputation as a sports journalist, particularly as editor of Finskt Idrottsblad from 1913 to 1920, and was considered the leading sports writer in the Nordic countries during this period. He was one of the founders of the Swedish Finland Sports Federation (FSGI) in 1912. He was also a member of the Finnish Olympic Committee 1919–1926. From 1915 onward he worked as part of the editorship at Dagens Press, Svenska Tidningen, Hufvudstadsbladet and Svenska Pressen.

His essays on sport went far beyond conventional reporting, drawing on the philosophy of Henri Bergson and William James to explore the irrational fascination of competitive athletics. These were collected in Idrottens filosofi (The Philosophy of Sport, 1917), which was acclaimed as a unique contribution to sports literature. From 1915 he also worked for several Helsinki Swedish-language daily newspapers including Hufvudstadsbladet and Svenska Pressen.

=== Finland-Swedish nationalism ===
As the first editor of Studentbladet from 1911 to 1912, Eklund played a central role in the debate that led to the adoption of the term finlandssvensk (Finland Swede) as the standard designation for the Swedish-speaking population of Finland, and to the coinage of finländare (Finn in a civic sense) to distinguish Finnish citizens from Finnish-speakers.

In 1914 he edited the collection Svenskt i Finland. Ställning och strävanden (Swedish in Finland: Position and Aspirations), contributing its opening essay "Race, Culture, Politics", in which he argued that Finland-Swedish culture was an expression of Germanic racial characteristics. The racial argument receded in his later writing but continued to appear in veiled form.

=== Jäger movement and Civil War ===
Eklund was active in the resistance movement against Russian rule from early on. From 1903 to 1905 he worked within the resistance movement as an editor at the illegal flyer Veckans Nyheter. In 1904 he participated in the Grafton arms smuggling operation. From 1908 to 1917 he served as curator of Vasa nation at the University of Helsinki, which under his leadership became an important centre for the Jäger movement. Though he could not travel to Germany himself — he was a family man and too well known — he was an active recruiter and was reported to the authorities in March 1915 for urging his fellow students to go to Germany for military training. He was ordered to take leave from his post as curator but continued his activist work behind the scenes. He was among the founders of the Helsinki White Guard in August 1917.

During the Finnish Civil War, in the spring of 1918, Eklund was the first to publicly propose a monarchy for Finland, in an article in Wasabladet. The proposal drew sharp criticism in the Ostrobothnian press but gained broader currency later that year.

=== Parliament and later years ===
Eklund was elected to the Parliament of Finland in 1919 for the Swedish People's Party of Finland, representing the northern Vaasa constituency. Parliamentary work proved ill-suited to his temperament: true to his anti-democratic convictions, he became frustrated and declined to stand for re-election, serving only until 1922. He continued working as a journalist until his sudden death from pneumonia in 1927.

== Works ==
- Svenskt i Finland. Ställning och strävanden (editor, 1914)
- Idrottens filosofi (1917; abridged reprint 1970)
