= Finnic culture =

Finnic culture may refer to:

- Finnish culture, a combination of Finnic indigenous heritage with mainly Swedish cultural influence
- Estonian culture, a combination of Finnic indigenous heritage with mainly German cultural influence
- Sami culture, the traditions and heritage of the Laplanders
