= Kalevi Wiik =

Finnish linguist (1932–2015)

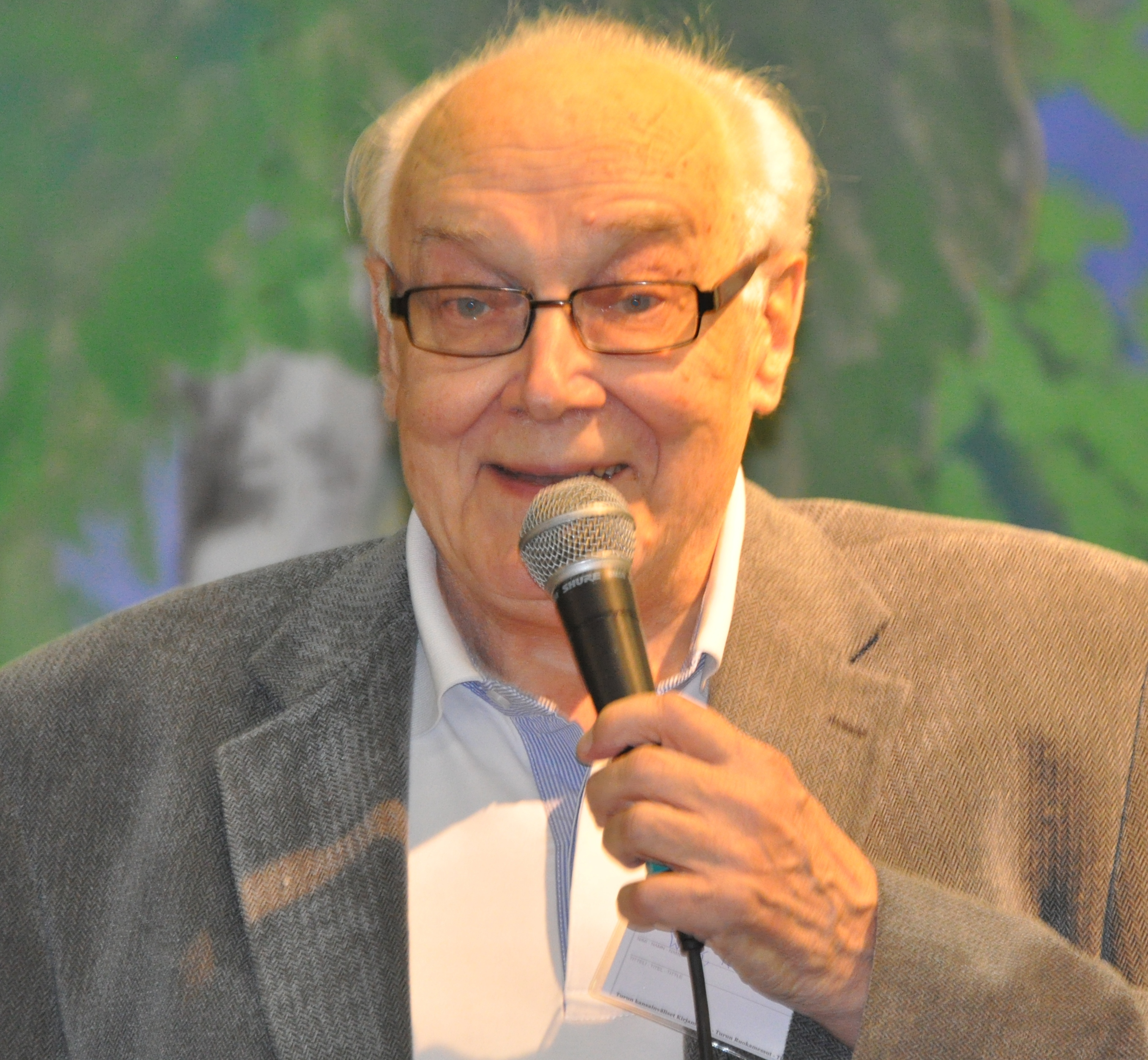
Kalevi Wiik

Kaino Kalevi Wiik (2 August 1932, Turku — 12 September 2015, Turku) was a professor of phonetics at the University of Turku, Finland. He was best known for his controversial hypothesis about the effect of the Uralic contact influence on the creation of various Indo-European protolanguages in Northern Europe such as Germanic, Slavic, and Baltic. He also based much of his hypothetical structures on results of genetics of his time. Ludomir R. Lozny states, "Wiik's controversial ideas are rejected by the majority of the scholarly community, but they have attracted the enormous interest of a wider audience."

== Hypothesis ==
Wiik proposed Indo-European origins in Southeast Europe by using linguistic, genetic, archaeological and anthropological data to support his hypotheses. He believed that from 23,000 to 8000 BC (the last ice age), inhabitation in Europe was in three main regions during the Last Glacial Maximum, and their populations then came to divide Europe between themselves.

Western 'Basque' Europe and Northern 'Uralic' Europe were inhabited by hunters of large animals that were abundant. The people spoke languages related respectively to modern Basque and Uralic. The rest of Europe was inhabited by hunters of smaller animals and fragmented into many smaller unknown languages.

By 5500 BC, the extinction of many large species of animals reduced the inhabitants of Western Europe and Northern Europe to hunting small game. The inhabitants of South-East Europe (hypothesised to have spread from the Balkans) had adopted the Neolithic way of life of mixed farming and animal husbandry and were becoming economically more successful. Early farmers diffusing from Greece and the Balkans gave rise to Indo-European, serving as a lingua franca of the inhabitants of region and displacing or gradually converting linguistically the less successful hunters from the other regions.

Wiik suggests that at the periphery of the Indo-European language expansion, the Germanic, Baltic, Slavic, Celtic and Iberian languages developed; they were Indo-European mixed with many elements from the languages of the hunters: Basque and Uralic. He claims the Post-Swiderian people (originating from western Poland) as Finnic-Ugric, and the Saami as migrants from (Magdalenian) Western Europe who changed their original language, probably Basque-like, to a Uralic tongue.

Thus, Wiik proposes that eventually most of Europe was Indo-Europeanized as many of the Basque and Uralic speaking hunters adopted Indo-European languages. Only in the periphery of the European continent, in Iberia and in Northeastern Europe strong nuclei of hunters apparently adopted farming without being linguistically converted: their descendants are Basque- and Finnish-speakers. Everywhere else, the Indo-European languages have won the upper hand. The key proposition in Wiik's hypothesis is the phonetically-derived idea that the Finnic-Ugric and Basque populations who adopted the fashionable Indo-European language replaced their own new language but used pronunciations in a way familiar to their birth language, which all gave rise to the new language. In essence, Wiik suggests that Germanic, Slavic, Baltic, Celtic and Iberian did not emerge from Indo-Europeans themselves but from the Finnic-Ugric and Proto-Basque populations. That would make the Germanic, Slavic, Baltic, Celtic and Iberian populations genetically as descendants not of Indo-European but of Finnic-Ugric and Proto-Basque respectively, a claim not fully supported by any genetic evidence.

In “Where Did European Men Come From,” Wiik surveyed Y chromosome variation in Europeans and in accordance with his position: "The men of the Balkan refuge were more likely than those of any other to have spoken an early form of the Indo-European language."

== Criticism ==
The possible linguistic substrate in Germanic seems to have nothing in common with Uralic languages, and there is no evidence for Uralic languages ever having been spoken in Central Europe, as opposed to Northern and Eastern Europe, where they were spoken.
