= Friedrich Rühs =

German historian (1781–1820)

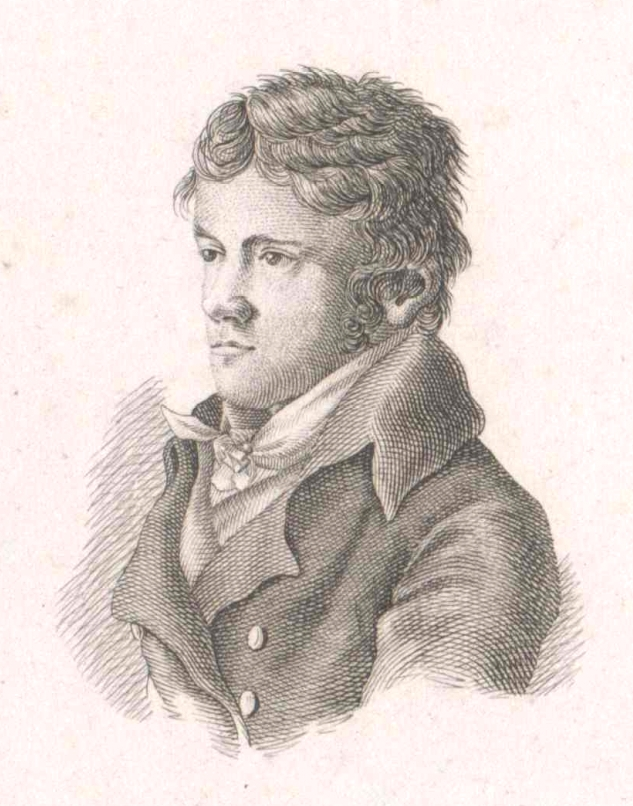
Friedrich Rühs

Friedrich Rühs (1781-1820) was a German historian of Scandinavian and Germanic history. At the time of the Liberation War he wrote xenophobic anti-French and anti-Jewish nationalist texts, and is seen as a forerunner of volkish antisemitism.

== Works ==
- Geschichte Schwedens, 5 Bände, Halle 1803–1814 (schwed. Übersetzung: 1823-25)
- Finland und seine Bewohner, Greifswald 1809
- Entwurf einer Propädeutik des historischen Studiums [1811], Neuauflage (Band 7 der Reihe Wissen und Kritik) hg. und eingeleitet v. Dirk Fleischer u. Hans Schleier, Waltrop 1997.
- Über den Ursprung der Isländischen Poesie, Berlin 1813
- Historische Entwickelung des Einflusses Frankreichs und der Franzosen auf Deutschland und die Deutschen, Berlin 1815
- Über die Ansprüche der Juden auf das deutsche Bürgerrecht, Berlin 1815
- Das Verhältnis Holsteins und Schleswigs zu Deutschland und Dänemark, Berlin 1817
- Handbuch der Geschichte des Mittelalters (Neue verbesserte Auflage: Arnold, Stuttgart 1840)

=== As editor ===
- Carl Gustaf af Leopold (Autor): Schwedens neueste Verhältnisse, Greifswald 1804
- Carl Gustaf af Leopold (Autor): Vermischte prosaische Schriften, Rostock/Leipzig 1805
- Gustav III. (Autor): Werke in drei Bänden, Berlin 1805–1808
- Edda, nebst einer Einleitung über die nordische Poesie und Mythologie, Berlin 1812
