= Southern Bothnia =

Area in Finland

South Bothnia is an area in Finland near the Gulf of Bothnia. It was settled during the migration period, and used mainly for cultivation at the time.
