= Paatelainen =

Paatelainen is a surname. Notable people with the surname include:

- Markus Paatelainen (born 1983), retired Finnish football midfielder
- Matti Paatelainen (born 1944), Finnish former international footballer
- Mikko Paatelainen (born 1980), Finnish former professional footballer
- Mixu Paatelainen (born 1967), Finnish former professional football player
