= Mesaba Co-op Park =

Member-owned park near Hibbing, Minnesota

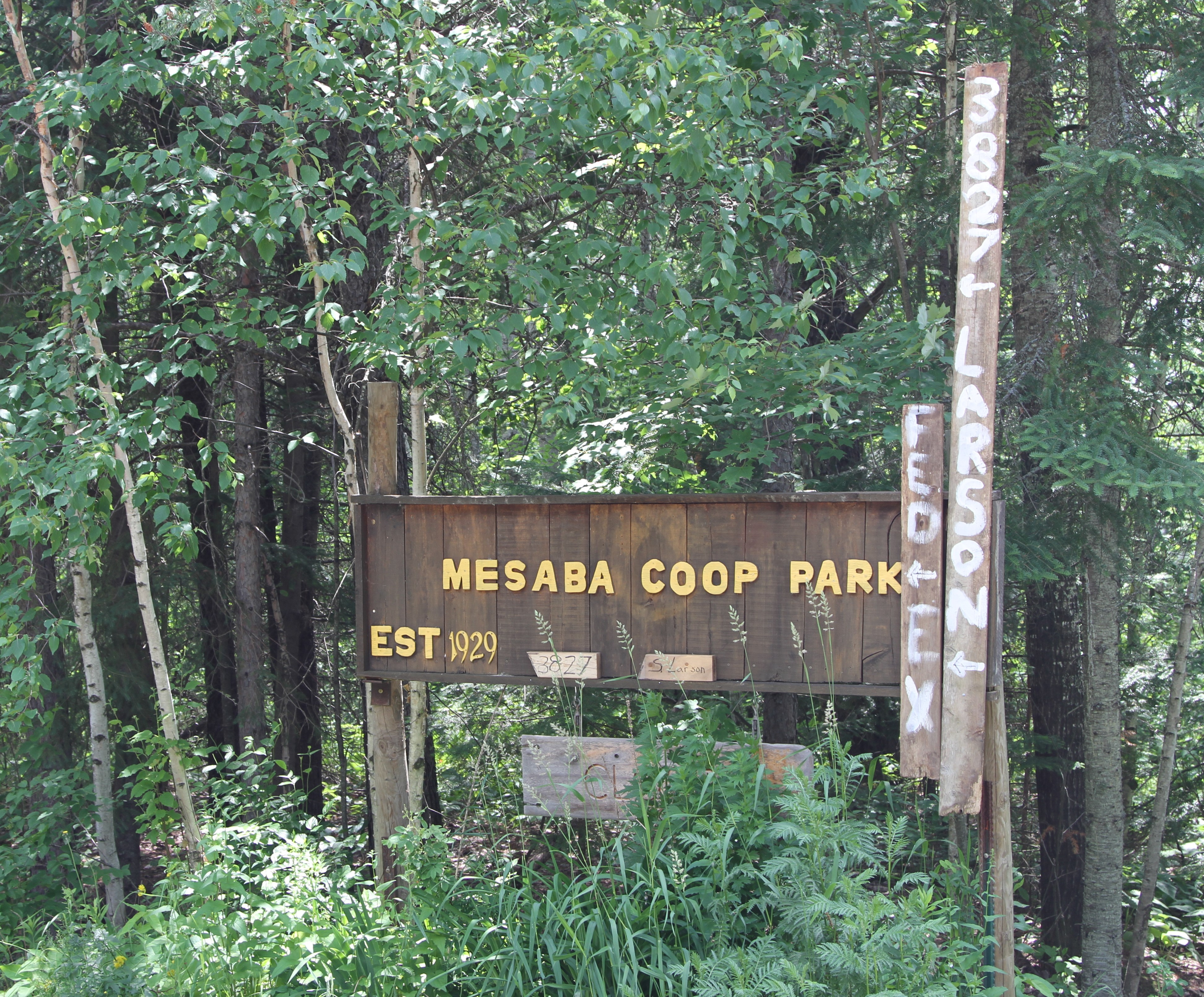
- Interactive map of Mesaba Co-op Park
- Type: Co-operative park
- Location: St. Louis County, Minnesota
- Nearest city: Hibbing, Minnesota
- Coordinates: 47°23′40″N 92°47′45″W
- Area: 240 acres (0.97 km^{2})
- Created: 1929

Mesaba Co-op Park is a co-operative park located near Hibbing, Minnesota. It is one of the few remaining continuously operated co-operative parks in the country. A gathering place of the Finnish co-operative movement based on Finnish immigrants to the United States, the park served the ethnic political radicals who energized the Iron Range labor movement and Minnesota's Farmer–Labor Party. The member-owned park is open to the public. It was listed on the National Register of Historic Places in 2019.

== History ==
In late 1928, the Mesaba Range Co-operative Federation began securing land for a park to accommodate large Finnish gatherings. One hundred and sixty acres, including a fifty-two-acre lake not shown on lumber company maps, were purchased for $2000. Forty Finnish American organizations purchased membership shares. Volunteers cleared land for a road, grounds, and building sites.

The period of the park's founding was one of anti-Finnish sentiment. Signs across the Range read, "No Indians or Finns allowed." The Finns' prominent role in the 1907 and 1916 Mesaba Range strikes had led to blacklisting. The Finnish co-operative movement was, in part, a response to this discrimination. In June 1929, as work progressed, an article in the Finnish-language newspaper Työmies (The Workman) announced that local Finns would celebrate in Chisholm for the last time without a progressive venue of their own.

The park opened on September 22, 1929. In the spring of 1930, construction began on a caretaker's residence and a children's school. The park's centerpiece, a dance pavilion, was completed in June 1930. Early festivals featured plays, track and field events, swimming, and dances. In addition to sports, students at the North Star children's camp were given an introduction to working-class thought.

The park became a gathering place for members of the Farmer-Labor party, the Congress of Industrial Organizations (CIO), and the Communist Party of America. As a boy, Iron Ranger Gus Hall, a four-time Communist Party candidate for president, helped his father and others build the dance pavilion.

Between eight and ten thousand people attended the park's 1936 summer festival. They heard speeches from Elmer Benson and John T. Bernard, Farmer-Labor candidates for governor and congressman, respectively. A dance that summer, featuring accordionist Viola Turpeinen, packed over one thousand people onto the dance floor in alternating shifts.

In 1938, the creation of the House Un-American Activities Committee initiated the era of communist "witch-hunts," blacklisting, and guilt-by-association persecution. During this period of fear, intimidation, and surveillance, whipped into a near-frenzy by the committees of Senator Joseph McCarthy in the 1950s, it was difficult to belong to the park.

FBI agents stationed outside the park collected the license plate numbers of those who entered. The park was stigmatized as the "Commie Park," "the Happy Hippie Commie Camp," and the "Red Park." This "red-baiting" atmosphere, combined with the increasing Americanization of Finnish children and post-World War II patriotism, led to a decline in membership that seriously threatened the park's survival. Opening membership to individuals as well as groups in 1959 was a necessary response.

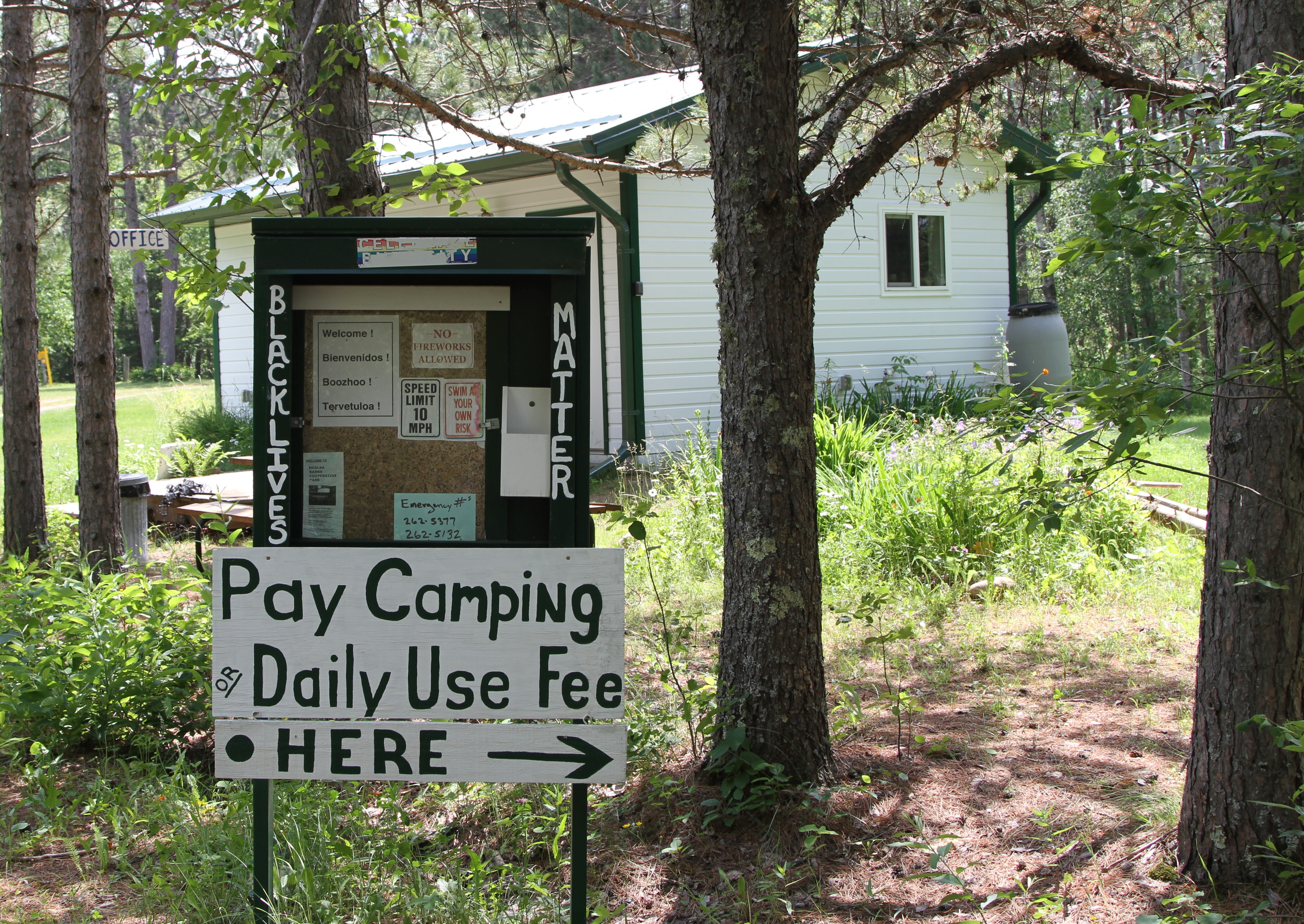
"Black Lives Matter" on an information sign by the park office in 2022

In the late 1960s and early 1970s, young people spurred the park's revival. Many had no Finnish heritage and came from the anti-war, environmentalist, and feminist movements. Younger members affiliated with the respected Työmies newspaper, like Weikko Jarvi and Timo and Belinda Poropudas, helped bridge the generational, cultural, and trust gaps between the aging Finns and the diverse newcomers.

The original socialist and communist politics of Mesaba Co-op Park have largely faded, replaced by a general spirit of progressivism. Additional land was acquired, bringing the park's total size to 240 acres. The main annual event remains the Juhannes, or Midsummer, festival. It features folk dancing, guest speakers, music, a Maypole, late-night bonfire, Finnish American mojakka stew, and an arts camp for children.

The park also stands as a reminder of the many small Finn halls once dotting the Iron Range. As those halls closed, their contents, including lumber, chairs, a barrel stove, and stage drops and scenery, often found a new home at Mesaba Park.
