= Finnish genocide =

Finnish genocide may refer to:

- Genocide of the Ingrian Finns, the mass deportations and genocide of Ingrian Finns by the Soviet Union
- Finnish Operation of the NKVD, the 1937–1938 mass arrests, executions, and deportations of Finns in the Soviet Union
