= Finnish Labour Temple =

Hall in Thunder Bay, Ontario, Canada

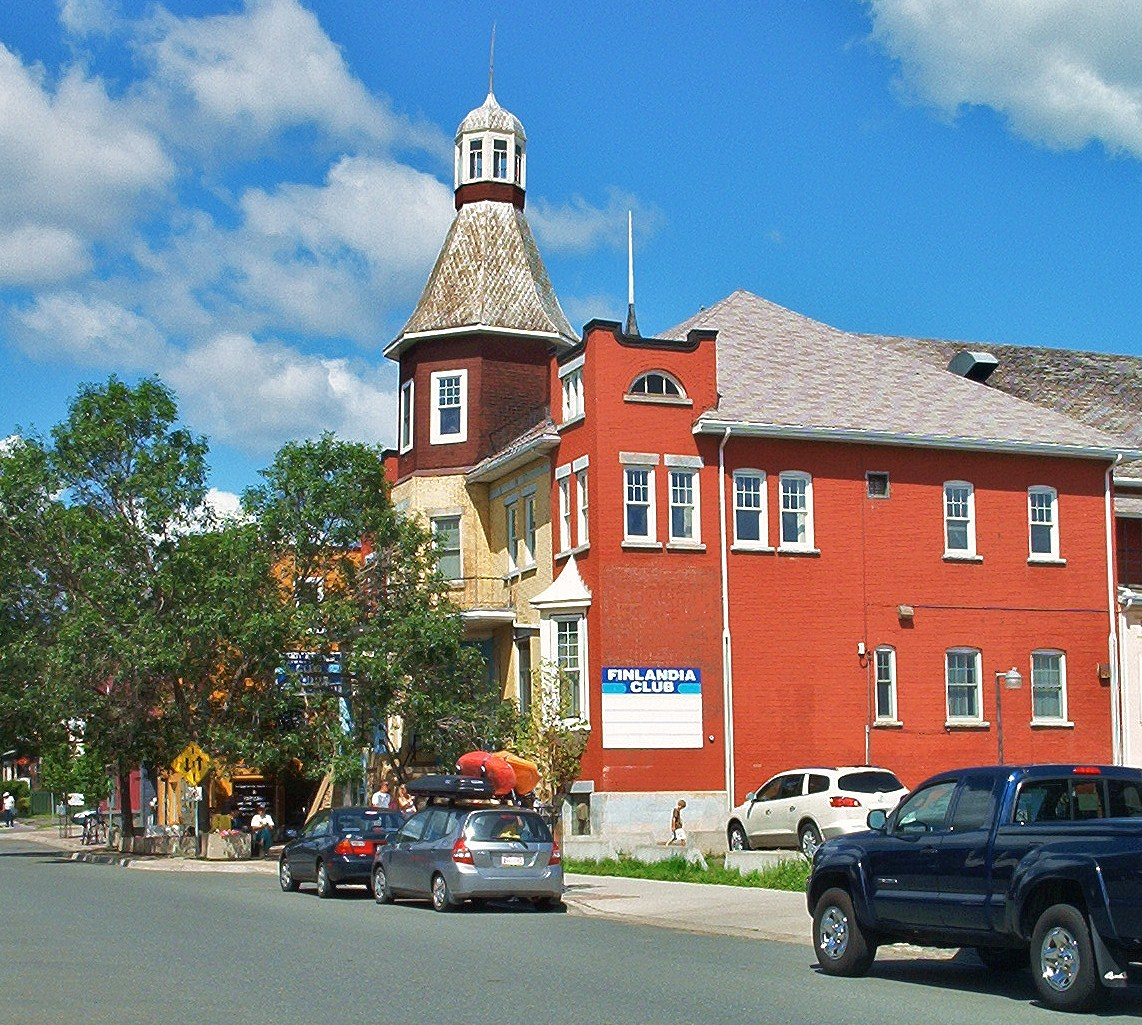
- As seen from the intersection of Bay and Algoma in 2008

General information
- Type: Hall
- Location: 314 Bay Street; Thunder Bay, Ontario, Canada
- Coordinates: 48°25′56″N 89°13′48″W
- Current tenants: The Hoito
- Construction started: 1908
- Completed: March 1910

Design and construction
- Architect: C.W. Wheeler

National Historic Site of Canada
- Official name: Finnish Labour Temple National Historic Site of Canada
- Designated: 2011

The Finnish Labour Temple (also known as the Big Finn Hall or Finlandia Club) was a Finnish-Canadian cultural and community centre ("Finn hall") and a local landmark located at 314 Bay Street in the Finnish quarter in Thunder Bay, Ontario.

Built in 1910, the Finnish Labour Temple was at one point one of the largest workers' halls in Canada in addition to being the centre of Finnish cultural and political life in Northwestern Ontario. The hall housed the historic Hoito Restaurant, a museum, and featured a large stage, dance floor, and hall as well as meeting rooms for various groups. The Finnish Labour Temple served as one of the main locations of the Bay Street Film Festival.

The building was badly damaged by a fire on December 22, 2021 and the remains were demolished in early 2022. A rebuild was planned, but as of 2026 construction has stalled.

== Construction ==
The construction of the Finnish Labour Temple was initiated by two organizations, the Finnish-American Workers' League Imatra #9 and the "Uusi Yritys" or New Attempt Temperance Society, who formed the Finnish Building Company. The lot for the hall had been purchased by socialist local in June 1907 and blueprints for the hall had already been prepared in early December 1908 by architect C.W. Wheeler. The building opened its doors to the public in March 1910, holding three consecutive days of opening ceremonies.

The inscription on the top of the building reads "Labor Omnia Vincet," meaning "labour conquers all."

== Early Labour Temple activity, 1910–1914 ==
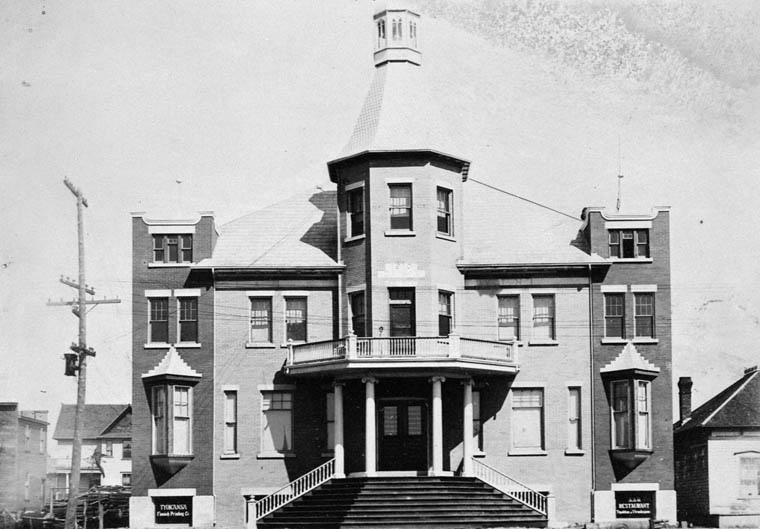
The Finnish Labour Temple in 1910

Already in 1910, the hall was referred to as the "Port Arthur Finnish Socialist's Local Temple" as the socialist local had become the majority share holder in the hall and was connected to the Port Arthur Branch of the Socialist Party of Canada. The Temperance Society had basically become a committee of the socialist local. By December 1910, however, foreign language locals of the Socialist Party had been expelled from the party. In 1911, a new organization called the Finnish Socialist Organization of Canada had been formed, which then became affiliated to the Social Democratic Party of Canada.

In January 1910, during the first annual meeting of the Finnish Building Company, the membership voted to rent the downstairs of the hall to the Finnish Publishing Company, who occupied the basement until the summer of 1912 when it moved to its own building next door. Of note, was the first Finnish-Canadian newspaper Työkansa (The Working People), which was published by the Finnish Publishing Company. Between 1910 and 1914, the basement of the hall also housed several co-operative restaurants and a billiards room.

On September 12–17, 1910, the Trades and Labour Congress of Canada held its annual convention at the Finnish Labour Temple complementing the "industry, thrift and co-operative spirit" of the Finnish community in the commemorative booklet given to convention delegates.

== The First World War and the communist/syndicalist split ==
During the First World War, the foreign-language affiliates of the Social Democratic Party were declared illegal by the Canadian Government. This led to many difficulties as several Finnish-language newspapers were banned and leading organizers were arrested. At this time, many Finnish workers joined the rapidly emerging One Big Union and the regional support group became the majority share holder of the Finnish Building Company.

In 1919, a split occurred at the One Big Union National Convention held at the Finnish Labour Temple. The split was essentially between two different factions; Finnish socialists who believed that the working class needed a political arm, and Finnish syndicalists who felt that social change could best be achieved through economic direct action such as the general strike. As a result, the Finnish socialists were ousted and bought their own building next door at 316 Bay Street or the "Little Finn Hall", and became affiliated with the Communist Finnish Organization of Canada. The Finnish workers who maintained control of the Finnish Labour Temple affiliated to the Industrial Workers of the World after the Winnipeg General Strike and the collapse of the One Big Union.

== The Finnish Wobblies—1919 to the 1960s ==
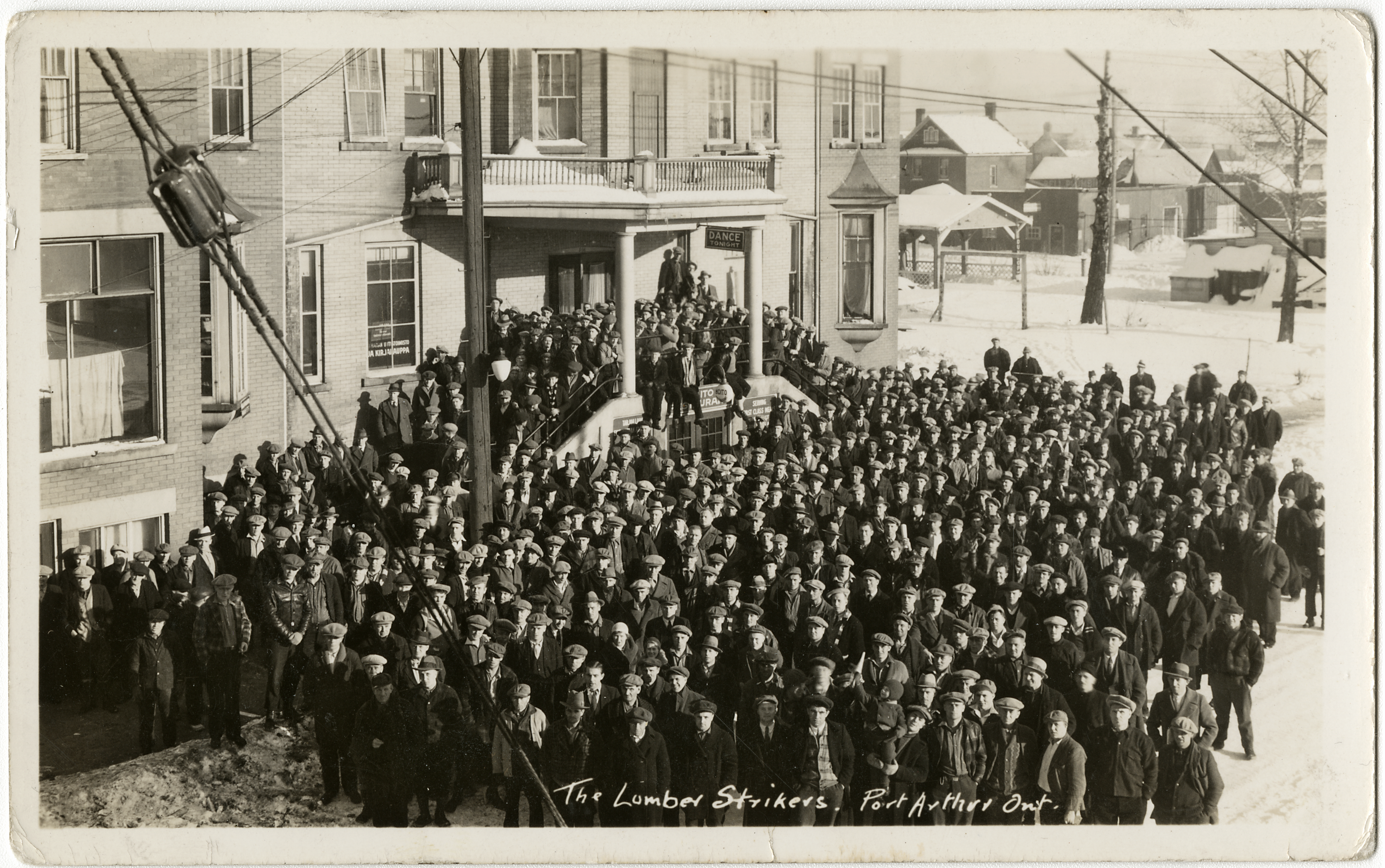
Striking lumber workers outside the Finnish Labour Temple, 1933

The syndicalist oriented Finns remained affiliated with the Industrial Workers of the World (IWW) and the auxiliary organization, Canadan Teollisuusunionistinen Kannatusliitto (Canadian Industrial Worker Support Circle or CTKL). This was the group responsible for establishing and operating the Hoito Restaurant as well as establishing a chain of People's Co-operative stores in the region. The Finnish Labour Temple acted as the Canadian IWW administrative offices for several years and housed the Canadian news service headquarters for the Industrialisti, the Finnish-language daily newspaper of the IWW. The Finnish Wobblies were also able to pay off the mortgage on the building.

The IWW competed for the hearts and minds of members with the communist-dominated unions, and held union locals well into the 1940s. With the younger generation rapidly being assimilated into dominant Canadian society, the IWW and CTKL in Northwestern Ontario became friendship and mutual aid societies for an aging membership. In the late 1960s, following the last major wave of Finnish immigration to Canada, a new organization called the Finlandia Club of Port Arthur became the majority shareholder of the hall. The new wave of immigrants were a generation separated from their Finnish-Canadian brethren and had no connection to the social struggles of the past. In addition, the newly arriving immigrants were either apolitical or conservative, associating any left-wing activity with the brutality of Stalinism and the Finnish Winter War. This was despite the fact that the Finnish Wobblies in Canada and the U.S. had actively supported and aided Finland in the war against the Soviet Union and denounced Bolshevism, from a libertarian socialist perspective, since the Kronstadt uprising.

== 21st century ==
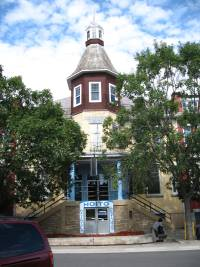
Front façade

The Finnish Labour Temple was the last remaining Finnish cultural centre in Canada, and has been designated a National Historic Site of Canada. In 2015 a ceremony was held to install a plaque marking the Finnish Labour Temple as a National Historic site.

The Hoito Restaurant was a very popular eatery for locals and tourists; in the early 21st century, there was a marked increase in activity in the hall as a new generation of locals stepped in to revive and breathe new life into this historic building. This includes a mojakka competition; an annual Finnish-Canadian art exhibit during the summer solstice. This, along with more traditional dances, celebrations, and events like St. Urho's Day made the Finnish Labour Temple a distinctive tourist attraction in Thunder Bay. The Finnish Labour Temple was home to The Finlandia Association Of Thunder Bay, previous owner of the building, and other local companies such as The Walleye Magazine and Seek Tours.

In May 2020, because of outstanding debt, the Finlandia Association voted to liquidate its assets, including the hall. A group - The Finlandia Co-operative - was created to raise money to buy the building, but was unsuccessful. In October 2020, the sale of the new building to a private owner was confirmed. The new owner said he wanted to reopen The Hoito Restaurant and convert the rest of the building into "high-end apartments". It had been anticipated that the restaurant would reopen in early summer 2022.

However, during the early evening hours of December 22, 2021, amid on-going renovations, smoke could be seen billowing from the rooftop, and The Hoito restaurant suffered extensive damage when a massive fire burned through the Finnish Labour Temple building above.

By mid-February 2022, the remains of the building destroyed in the fire were completely demolished and removed from the site. The property owner stated plans to rebuild and recreate the former façade of the structure including the iconic cupola. It was also anticipated that the Hoito restaurant would be re-established on the main floor of the new building, and not in the basement as it existed previously. However, construction had stalled by the end of 2022, and as of 2026 the site was still derelict.

On March 3, 2022, it was announced that a time capsule hidden in the foundation during construction in 1909 had been recovered. The time capsule was opened on April 27, 2022, and the contents digitized and preserved at Lakehead University's archives.

== See also ==
- Co-operatives
- Finnish history
- Libertarian socialism
- Ukrainian Labour Temple, Winnipeg
- San Francisco Labor Temple
- 411 Seniors Centre - formerly Vancouver's Labor Temple, where events in the 1918 Vancouver general strike took place
