= Waino, Wisconsin =

- Unincorporated community
- Location within Wisconsin Location within the United States
- Coordinates: 46°38′23″N 91°34′25″W
- Country: United States
- State: Wisconsin
- County: Douglas
- Town: Brule
- Elevation: 948 ft (289 m)
- Time zone: UTC-6 (Central (CST))
  - Summer (DST): UTC-5 (CDT)
- Area codes: 715 and 534
- GNIS feature ID: 1576147

Waino is an unincorporated community in the town of Brule, Douglas County, Wisconsin, United States.

== History ==
=== Round Finn Hall ===
Some of the participants at the July 1927 Young Workers League summer camp in front of Waino's "Round Finn Hall."

Waino's "Round Finn Hall" was a "Finn hall", a cultural center of Finnish Americans. It was the site to a number of gatherings related to the American radical movement in the 1920s and 1930s. The county seat of Douglas County, Superior, as well as the neighboring city of Duluth, Minnesota, were in the early 20th century a regional center of industry, including timber production and shipping, ore docks, commercial shops, and railway yards. The region was a center of Finnish-American immigration in America, with Superior additionally the home of Työmies (The Worker), an official publication first of the Finnish Socialist Federation and from 1922 of the Workers (Communist) Party of America.

Waino and its Round Finn Hall made a close and comfortable location for gatherings of radical Finns in a rural setting. From 1925, and for several years thereafter, this was the site of the national summer school of the Communist Party's youth section, the Young Workers League. The Finnish cooperative movement, dominated in the 1920s and early 1930s by Communist Party adherents, also held a number of gatherings and festivals at the location.
