= Matti Paatelainen =

Finnish footballer (born 1944)

Personal information
- Date of birth: 17 July 1944 (age 82)
- Place of birth: Äänekoski, Finland
- Position: Striker

Senior career*
Years	Team	Apps	(Gls)
1966	Urho		
1967–1968	HPS		(20)
1969–1972	HIFK		(84)
1973–1977	FC Haka	110	(72)

International career
1970–1977	Finland	47	(11)

Managerial career
- 1979–1980: FC Haka
- 1993: Ilves
- * Club domestic league appearances and goals

Matti Paatelainen (born 17 June 1944) is a Finnish former international footballer who played as a striker.

== Career ==
Paatelainen earned 47 caps for Finland, scoring eleven goals, between 1970 and 1977. He played club football at Urho, HPS, HIFK and FC Haka. He was Mestaruussarja top scorer in 1970, 1972, 1976 and 1977

He appeared in nine FIFA World Cup qualifying matches, scoring once.

== Personal life ==
Paatelainen has three sons who all have played professional football - Mixu, Mikko and Markus.
