= Anti-Finnish sentiment =

Hostility, prejudice, discrimination or racism against Finland and Finnish culture

Anti-Finnish sentiment (sometimes known as Fennophobia) is the hostility, prejudice, discrimination or racism directed against Finns, Finland, Finnish culture, or other related Finnic peoples.

== Estonia ==
Finnish tourists and residents have experienced verbal harassment and at times physical violence, particularly in areas with many Finnish tourists and residents in Estonia.

== Norway ==
Finns have been emigrating to Norway since at least the 11th century. Because of this, there exists a Finnic minority group in Norway; the Kvens. Speaking a Finnish dialect or a closely related Finnic language (their form of speech is now called Kven) was forbidden in Norway, and they experienced discrimination. Before the Second World War, Norway feared mass immigration and invasion from Finland. This was used as an excuse to discriminate against Kvens.

== Russia ==
The Russian word chukhna (чухна́) is a derogatory term for Finnish and Finnic people. The ministry for foreign affairs of Russia called for Russians to not use the word.

== Soviet Union ==
Ingrian Finns were heavily persecuted in Soviet Russia, including being subject to forced deportations, and a genocide. 8,000–25,000 Finns were killed during the Great Purge, including the Finnish Operation of the NKVD. (These numbers are estimates; real numbers might be much higher)

Agnessa Haikara wrote a documentary book Who is Knocking at Your Door? about Murmansk Finns and Kola Norwegians repressed in the Soviet Union, for which she was prosecuted in Russia.

== Sweden ==
During the 1960s and 1970s, there was a significant influx of Finnish economic migrants into Sweden. Between 1950 and 1980 the number of Finns in Sweden increased from 45,000 to over 300,000. Attitudes towards Finnish immigrants were quite negative in Sweden. Derogatory expressions en finne igen ('yet another Finn') and finnjävel (equivalent to 'Finnish bastard' or 'Finnish devil') were commonly used. An anthology, Finnjävlar, was published, in which 15 Finns in Sweden describe their lives and lives of their parents in Sweden. In Sweden, the Tornedalians were also once seen as an inferior race and speaking Finnish was banned in school.

Both Finnish and Meänkieli (spoken in Torne Valley) became official minority languages of Sweden in 2000, and the Swedish state started an investigation into the historical treatment of Finns and Tornedalians in 2020.

Finnjävel (singular) and finnjävlar (plural) are derogatory terms used in Sweden for Finnish immigrants, mostly during the 1950s and 1960s. Jävel or djävel, meaning devil or demon, is a generic strong insult.

== United States ==
The prominent role of Finnish immigrants in the 1907 and 1916 Mesabi Range strikes in Minnesota led to blacklisting of Finns. It was a time of anti-Finnish sentiment in the area, and one could see signs "No Indians or Finns allowed". They were also involved with the union, which the exploitative mining companies heavily disliked. In response to the union, the Finns earned a bad reputation among the companies. The fact that the Finnish language is a Finno-Ugric language and not related to most other European languages was used as proof that the Finns were not European, and thus fair subjects of discrimination.

China Swede was a derogatory term used for Finnish immigrants in the United States during the early 1900s, particularly in northern Minnesota and Upper Michigan. Another term was roundhead. The term jackpine savage was used in northern Minnesota during the early 1900s, referring to the term Indian savage used for Native Americans. Finnish businesses were also harassed with the pretext that they were illegally dealing liquor to Native Americans.

== See also ==
- Racism
- Chukhna
- Lynching of Olli Kinkkonen
- Mesaba Co-op Park
- Russification of Finland
- Genocide of the Ingrian Finns
