= Heikki Lunta =

Personification of the Finnish snow deity

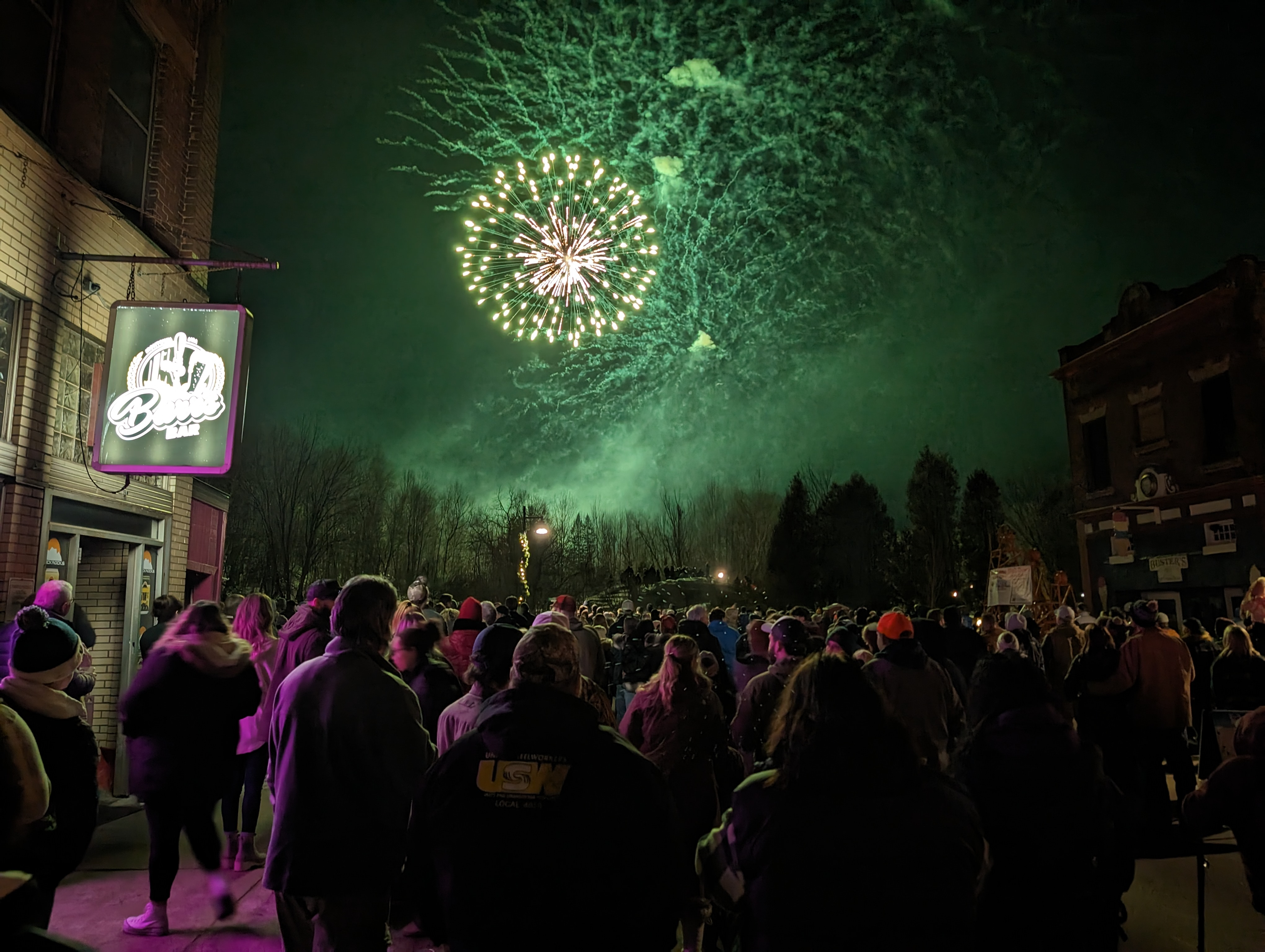
Heikki Lunta Winter Festival fireworks display 2024

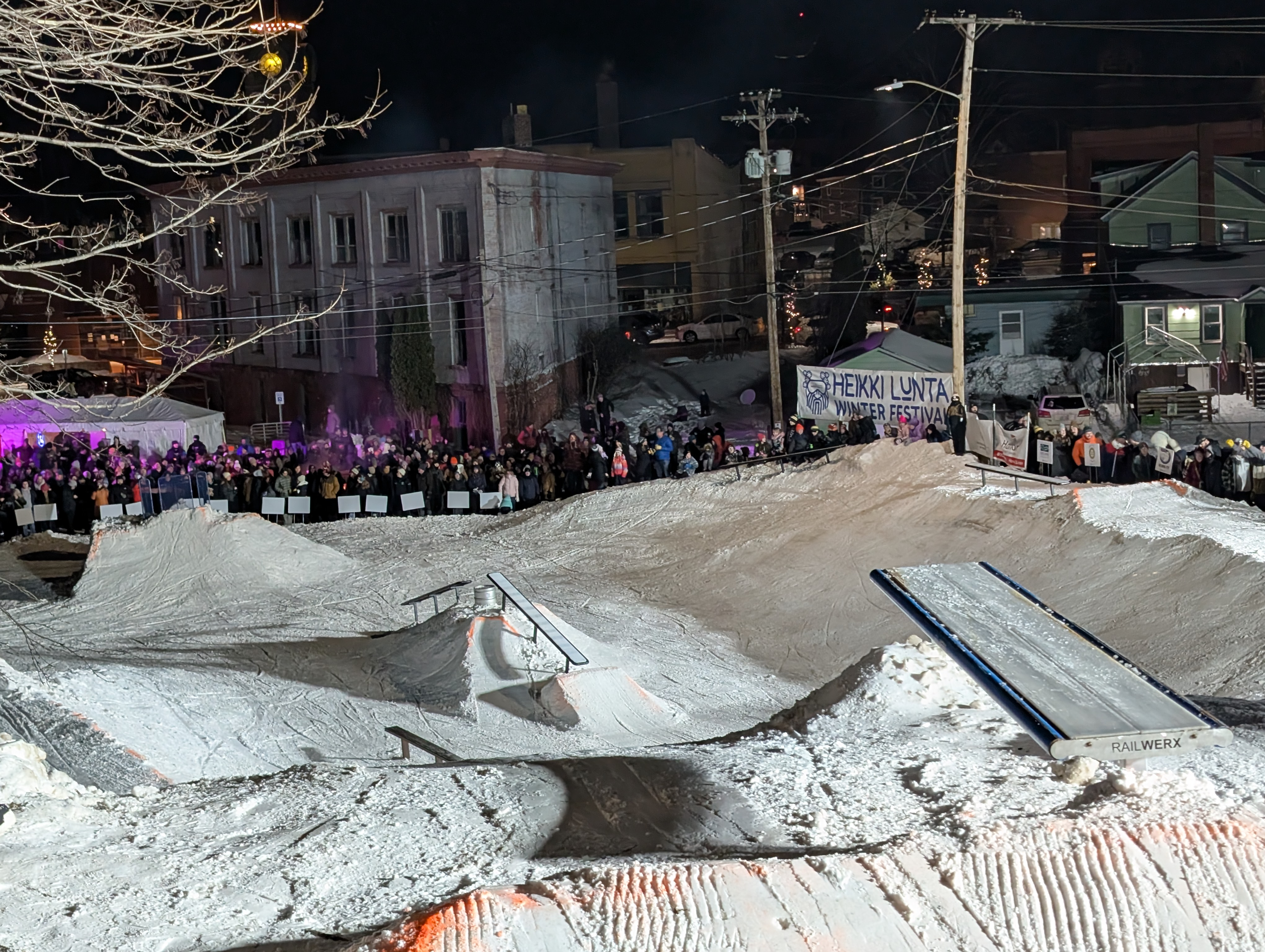
Urban skiing event at the 2025 Heikki Lunta Winter Festival

Heikki Lunta is the personification of the snow god in the folklore of the Upper Peninsula of Michigan, influenced by Finnish mythology. The character of Heikki Lunta is a product of the heavy Finnish-American presence in the Keweenaw Peninsula of Michigan, paired with a tremendous annual snowfall. The character has become an established part of local culture and media.

== History ==
David Riutta created "Heikki Lunta" (the name translates to "Hank Snow" in English) in 1970. When an upcoming snowmobile race hosted by the Range Snowmobile Club of Atlantic Mine was endangered by the lack of snowfall, Riutta, a worker at WMPL in Hancock, aired the "Heikki Lunta Snowdance Song". The song goes on to ask "Heikki Lunta," the Finnish-American snow god, for snow in time for the race. According to local tales, the snow fell and fell, until there was too much. People were superstitious that Riutta's song had caused too much snow for the race, so in response to public outcry, Riutta recorded the separate track, "Heikki Lunta Go Away." The 45 showcased each song on alternate sides.

The legends of Heikki Lunta have since expanded through children's stories and stage plays: ranging from his origins in central Finland as the son of Eljas and Saima Lunta, to his siblings, to his childhood sweetheart, Aino Mäkinen.

== See also ==
- Jack Frost
- Paul Bunyan
- Rain dance
- Saint Urho
