= Genocide of the Ingrian Finns =

20th-century genocide in the Soviet Union

- Part of the population transfer in the Soviet Union and the Great Purge
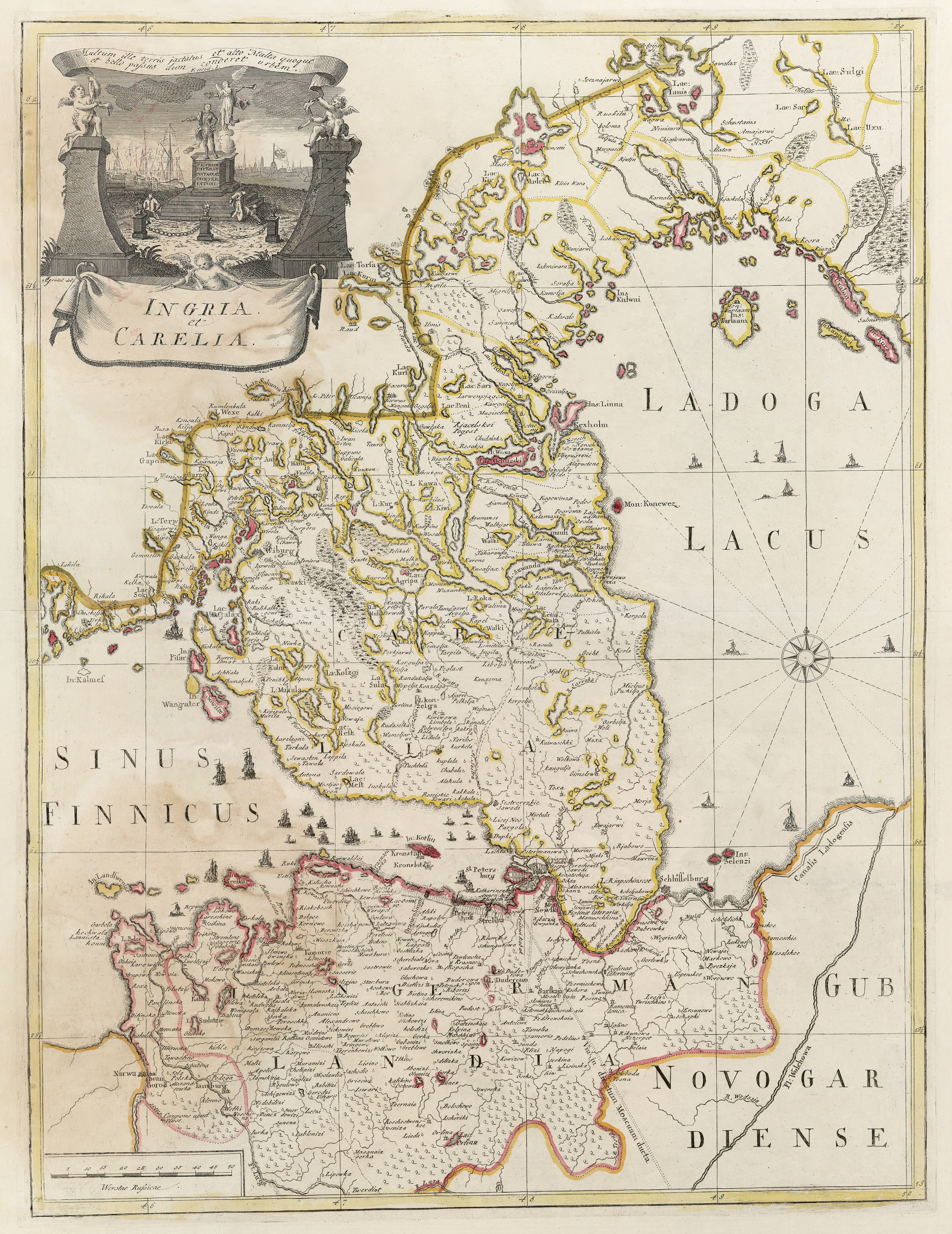
- Ingria and Karelia Isthmus in 1740s
- Location: Ingria
- Date: 1920s–1940s
- Target: Ingrian Finns
- Attack type: Mass murder, persecution, ethnic cleansing, deportation
- Deaths: 18,800
- Victims: 60,000 to 105,000 victims of deportation and imprisonment
- Perpetrator: Soviet Union
- Motive: Anti-Finnish sentiment, Russification, Sovietization

The genocide of the Ingrian Finns (Finnish: inkeriläisten kansanmurha, Ingrian: inkeriläisiin kansaamurha) was a series of events triggered by the Russian Revolution in the 20th century, in which the Soviet Union deported, imprisoned and killed Ingrian Finns and destroyed their culture. In the process, Ingria, in the historical sense of the word, ceased to exist. Before the persecution there were 140,000 to 160,000 Ingrians in Russia and today approximately 19,000 (including several thousand repatriated since 1990).

From 1935 onwards, the genocide manifested itself in deportations of entire Ingrian villages, mass arrests and executions. Deportations took place from the late 1920s to the end of World War II, and in particular during the Great Purge in 1937–1938. The reason for the genocide was the distrust of the Soviet Union toward the Ingrians due to their close cultural and historical ties with Finland. At the same time, many other ethnic groups and minorities were also persecuted.

The destruction process targeted at Ingrian Finns was centrally planned and deliberate. Russian legislation in the 1990s refers to it as genocide. Tens of thousands of Ingrians died due to deportations and in labor camps. Over 100,000 Russian Finns were deported en masse without trial, most of whom were Ingrian Finns. Ingria and the border region with Finland experienced ethnic cleansing of Finns during Stalin's regime.

== Background ==
Lutheran Finns had lived in Ingria for over 400 years, since the period of Swedish rule. They had immigrated there from Finland and the Karelian Isthmus and eventually started referring to themselves as Ingrian Finns. In 1919 the population of the Ingrian Finns was 132,000 in Ingria and an additional 10,000 in Petrograd. The Finnish-Soviet peace treaty of 1920 had granted Ingrian Finns a degree of national autonomy. A national district was formed in 1928 and Finnish was used in schools, radio and administration.

The Ingrian Finns were mainly independent small farmers in the 1920s and still in the early 1930s with relatively high literacy. They were predominantly Lutheran. Ingria was located in the vicinity of Leningrad, where they formed the second largest ethnic group after Russians in the 1930s. Ingrians were targeted from 1930 onwards. Red refugees who lost the Finnish Civil War took charge in the area. They forced propaganda for collectivization of the agriculture, reported the priests, helped arrest people and harassed Ingrian Finns and "Kulaks".

== Genocide ==
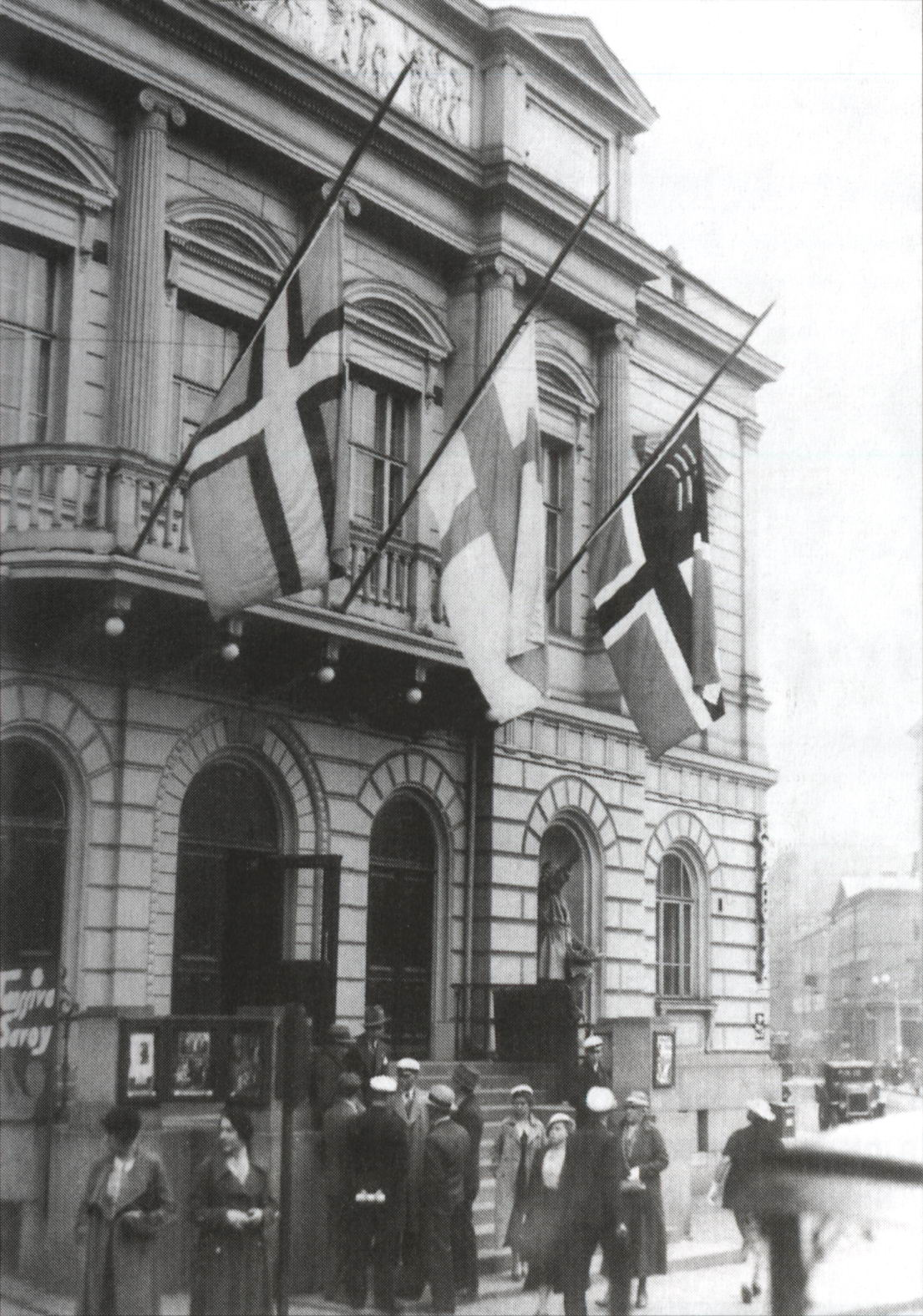
Flags of Ingria, Finland, and East-Karelia at half-mast as a protest against deportations at the Old Student House, Helsinki in 1934.

In 1926 Leningrad Oblast had a population of 115,000 Ingrians, alongside 15,500 Finnish Finns. Soviet repression began with the forced collectivization in 1928. Between 1929 and 1931, around 18,000 people were deported from areas near the Finnish border, consisting of up to 16% of the total Ingrian Finnish population, with Ukrainians, Tatars, and Russians settled in their place. Further deportations followed: 7,000 in 1935, and in 1936 a total of 26,000–27,000 were deported. In the 1939 census, the total number of Finns in Leningrad Oblast was reported as 114,600. The deported became, in practice, forced settlers and laborers. Deportations were carried out hastily, and the housing, tools, and access to food and healthcare were extremely inadequate, leading to high mortality.

The Soviet regime also targeted the Ingrian intelligentsia and religious leadership. Lutheran pastors and church workers were imprisoned, deported, or executed, while churches were converted into clubs and warehouses. In 1937 all Finnish-language schools, publications, and broadcasts were closed down, and Ingrian village councils and cultural institutions were abolished. Ingrian Finns were terrorized and coerced in ways that would now be described by the terms "genocide" and "ethnic cleansing".

During the 1937–1938 Finnish Operation of the NKVD, 4,000 Ingrian Finns were shot and over 10,000 deported to prison camps. By 1939 the Ingrian Finnish population had decreased to about 50,000, which was about 43% of 1928 population figures, and the Ingrian Finn national district was abolished.

Following the German invasion of the Soviet Union and the beginning of the Leningrad Blockade, in early 1942 all 20,000 Ingrian Finns remaining in Soviet-controlled territory were deported to Siberia. Most of the Ingrian Finns living in German-occupied territory were forcibly evacuated to Finland in 1943–1944. Following the Moscow Armistice, Finland was forced to return the evacuees. Soviet authorities did not allow the 55,733 people who had been handed over to settle back in Ingria, and instead deported them to central regions of Russia. The main regions of Ingrian Finns forced settlement were the interior areas of Siberia, Central Russia, and Tajikistan.

== Aftermath ==
During World War II, Ingria fell within combat areas and the Ingrian people were once again forcibly deported from their homeland for ethnic reasons by German and Finnish authorities. After the war, Soviet authorities did not allow the 55,000 people who had evacuated to Finland to settle back in Ingria, and instead resettled them in regions of central Russia. Ingrian Finns who had not evacuated alongside Soviet Germans were subjected to expulsions, deportations, and ethnic cleansing.

The deportations led to the rapid ethnic assimilation of Ingrian Finns. After 1956, return to Ingria was officially allowed but made unfeasible in practice; as a result, many settled in the nearby Finnic regions of Estonia and Karelia. By 1970, the Ingrian Finn population decreased by 50,000 people, a 43% decline from the 1928 population, which political scientist Rein Taagepera described as a "clear case of genocide". In 1989 there were 18,000 Finns in Ingria and Leningrad, and a total of 67,813 in the Soviet Union, with only 34.7% declaring Finnish as their main language. Ingrian and other Finns were not differentiated in the official census. The Soviet Union was silent about the Ingrians and they did not officially exist.

It was not until the dissolution of the Soviet Union in 1990 that Russia sought to improve their situation with new legislation. President Boris Yeltsin rehabilitated Russian Finns and some other groups as persecuted peoples. In addition to killings, the concept of genocide included mass deportations. However, the Russian state did little for the victims of the persecution. Few received significant compensation or their property back. Attempts began to revive Ingrian Finnish cultural life in Ingria, but at the same time, many Ingrian Finns moved to Finland.

Starting from 1990, Finland facilitated the return of Ingrian Finns to Finland under the leadership of President Mauno Koivisto. Although Koivisto initially expected mainly elderly Finnish speakers to arrive, the resettled population largely consisted of working-age, Russian-speaking individuals. Over 30,000 Ingrian Finns and their families relocated to Finland.

According to non-fiction writer Anni Reuter, Stalin's persecution of Finns became a topic of discussion and research in Finland only recently. She believes that the history of various Finnish groups in the Soviet Union is relatively poorly known in Finland. Reuter states that the issue seems to have been taboo for a long time, and was seldom addressed either in homes or schools. In Reuter's view, this may have been influenced by Finlandization, maintaining good relations with the Soviet Union, and the Cold War. She has emphasized the need to bring the large-scale mass deportations and persecutions experienced by Finns into school teaching and public awareness.

== See also ==
- Anti-Finnish sentiment
- North American Finns in Soviet Karelia
