= North American Finns in Soviet Karelia =

Karelia in the 21st century

During the 1920s and early 1930s, thousands of Finnish Americans and Finnish Canadians emigrated to Karelia, a region of the Soviet Union bordering Finland. Most of the emigrants were members of the Communist parties of the United States and Canada. They migrated to Soviet Karelia to help create what they believed would become a socialist, utopian country. Many came home disillusioned or were arrested and executed by the Soviets during the Great Terror of 1937 and 1938.

== Soviet Karelia ==
The historical region of Karelia was divided between Finland and the Soviet Union by the Treaty of Tartu in 1920. Western Karelia became part of Finland and eastern Karelia became part of the Soviet Union. Soviet Karelia reached from the northern shore of Lake Ladoga north to the White Sea. The Karelian language traditionally spoken in the region is closely related to the Finnish language. Several dialects of Karelian are spoken in the Soviet part of Karelia. The climate of Karelia is Dfb: warm summers, cold winters, and adequate precipitation in all seasons. Northern parts of Karelia have a sub arctic (Dfc) climate. Most of Karelia is forested. Harvesting timber has traditionally been the most important economic activity. After the end of World War I in 1918 and the creation of the Soviet Union, Russian emigration to Karelia was encouraged by the government. In 1926, the population of Soviet Karelia was about 260,000 of which 101,000 were Karelians and most of the remainder were Russians.

== Finns in North America ==
Between the late 1860s and 1914, more than 300,000 Finns emigrated to the United States and Canada. Most of them lived in the northern tier of U.S. states and neighboring Canada. Due to the Finnish language being unrelated to English, Finns had difficulty learning English and tended to be clannish.The Finns in North America were divided into two groups: the Whites and the Reds. The Whites were traditional, religious, and conservative. The Reds, up to 25 percent of the total, were attracted to leftist politics, including communism. The Finns were described as the most radical ethnic group in North America.

In the early 1920s, the new Soviet Union was in tatters after the October Revolution and Russian Civil War. In 1921, Soviet leader Vladimir Lenin appealed for help from the international working class and communist movements. He said, "We need help. The Soviet Republic of workers and peasants expects this help from the working people, the industrial workers and the small farmers." The New Economic Policy offered incentives for workers to emigrate to the Soviet Union. One of the first and most successful projects created by foreign workers was the Seattle Commune, an agricultural commune in the southeastern Soviet Union formed by Finnish-Americans from Seattle, Washington.

== Karelia Fever ==
As early as 1918, "Red" Finns from Finland began emigrating to Karelia, many without documentation. The first American Finns to arrive legally in Karelia came in 1922 and established a fishing commune in the far northern town of Kandalaksha. Three years later the first documented Canadian Finns arrived and founded two agricultural communes.

Migration of North American Finns to Karelia increased after 1930. In that year, several dozen Finnish-Americans involved in the Seattle Commune migrated to Karelia to form a new agricultural commune called Hiilisuo. Climatic conditions for agriculture were difficult in Karelia, but hay was needed for the 10,500 horses employed in the timber industry. Internal dissention fueled the move. Finns from the Seattle Commune joined other Finns and related Karelians in an environment and culture more familiar to them. Additional agricultural communes were also created in Karelia.

In 1931, the Soviet Government began promoting the emigration of North American Finns by creating the Karelian Technical Aid Committee in New York City. A second office was established in Toronto. The Committee often assisted prospective well-qualified emigrants with travel expenses; in other cases they selected emigrants who could contribute to the purchase of equipment and supplies. What resulted was "Karelia fever," a high demand by North American Red Finns to emigrate to Karelia. The Great Depression had left many Finnish Americans jobless and destitute and Soviet propaganda emphasized the high salaries, good living conditions, and opportunities to promote socialism in Karelia. Prospective emigrants were promised that Finns would have high social status in Karelia. "We were going to build socialism; we were going to a free country, where we would be met as best friends," said one emigrant. More than 6,000 North American Finns emigrated to Karelia in the early 1930s. Fifty-eight percent were American and 42 percent were Canadian. Sixty percent of the emigrants in Karelia became employed in the timber industry and 21 percent in construction. They brought with them new tools for felling and transporting timber as well as skilled labour management.

Living conditions for the new arrivals were difficult. Most were assigned to live in barracks five or six to a room with no conveniences, no furniture, and infested with insects. Food was watery-soup after a long wait in line. At first, the North American Finns had the right to shop for extra food at special stores for foreigners, but that right was cancelled in 1933. Medical care was inadequate or even unavailable. Cultural life was non-existent. Language barriers were a problem and the expertise of many of the newcomers was not taken into account. Moreover, the locals resented the North American Finns. They were accused of coming "to eat our bread" and regarded as privileged. The immigrants found it difficult to get permission to change jobs. Most of the new arrivals, however, stayed in Karelia. Some had no means to leave; others apparently found fulfilment in their jobs or in advancement of the "international proletariat revolution." Canadians adjusted better to the conditions than Americans.

By 1936, about 1500 of the North American Finns in Karelia had returned to the U.S. or Canada. They mostly avoided criticism of the Soviet Union to avoid repercussions on relatives and friends still there. A communist newspaper in the United States said, "Those who have returned from Karelia can be marked down as turncoats. The organized labor must treat them as enemies. They have no spine." The returnees were ostracized; the fate of those still in the Soviet Union was often worse. Most of those leaving had retained their U.S. or Canadian passports. North American Finns who, in enthusiasm for the Soviet Union, had given up their passports were often not allowed to leave.

== The Great Terror ==
The Great Terror of Joseph Stalin was based on the fear of "external and internal counterrevolution" dating back to the beginning of the Soviet Union. During the 1920s the central government began tightening the screws on non-conformity and "national deviationism." In the early 1930s, an enemy was needed to blame the widespread famine in the Soviet Union caused by the failure of the citizenry to meet production targets. The Finns, including the North Americans in Karelia, were blamed for "nationalism and "deviation from the Leninist-Stalin line." Beginning in 1935 most Finns in high level posts were replaced, expelled from the party, and some disappeared. Some Finnish Americans went into hiding; others left the country.

In 1935, the North American Finns who were leaders of agricultural communes were arrested, accused of sabotaging the achievement of production goals. Persecution, however, was episodic until August 1937 when the Soviet government set targets for the number of arrests. The target for Soviet Karelia was 1,000 arrests and 300 executions. The focus of the arrests was on ethnic minorities including the Finns. The target was more than met in a few months. in November, the number of people sentenced to be executed totalled 1,690. In January 1938, the total of those arrested totalled 5,340 of which 64.2 percent were Finns. they were mostly charged with being agents of foreign governments.

Golubev and Takala calculate that of 1300 to 1400 adult male North American Finns in Karelia in the late 1930s about 28 percent were arrested. Eighty percent of those arrested were executed. Their wives and children were disadvantaged by being relatives of "enemies of the people." Those arrested came from both the Canadian and American Finns who had moved to Karelia. The "Great Purge" or "Great Terror" mostly ended in November 1938.

== Aftermath ==
The Finnish community in Karelia was decimated. A few Finns migrated from there to the relative safety of the distant Ural Mountains. The Soviets prohibited the use of the Finnish language.

Most of the older members of the North American Finnish community in Karelia lost their idealism about the Soviet Union of the 1930s. The younger members of the community, however, often retained some of the views of their Soviet education. Writing sixty years later, one former young resident of the Soviet Union said, "Though the breakup [of the Soviet Union] was inevitable, it is still hard for me to admit that the country my parents believed in so fervently and sacrificed so much for has failed. It did not fail because socialism is a bad idea, however; it failed because socialism was never practiced there."
