= Finnish Operation of the NKVD =

Mass repressions against Finns in the Soviet Union

- Part of the mass operations of the NKVD during the Great Purge and the genocide of the Ingrian Finns (in Ingria)
- Location: Soviet Union
- Date: 1937–1938
- Target: Finns
- Attack type: Ethnic cleansing Prison shootings
- Deaths: 8,000–25,000
- Perpetrator: NKVD
- Motive: Russification; Anti-Finnish sentiment

The Finnish Operation of the NKVD was a mass arrest, execution and deportations of persons of Finnish origin in the Soviet Union by the NKVD during the period of the Great Purge (1937–1938). It was a part of the larger mass operations of the NKVD which targeted many minority nationalities in the Soviet Union. Different estimations range from 8,000 to 25,000 of Finns killed or disappearing during the repression.

== Early anti-Finnish campaigns ==
Soviet repression of the Ingrian Finns, the Finnish-speaking population native to the Leningrad region, started at the same time as the forced collectivization in the Soviet Union in 1928. Between 1929 and 1931, Soviet authorities deported 18,000 people from areas near the Finnish border, consisting of up to 16% of the total Ingrian Finnish population. All remaining Finns in four border parishes were deported in 1936 and replaced with Russians. In 1937, all Finnish-language schools, publications, broadcasts, and Ingrian Lutheran churches were closed down.

The Finnish Operation of the NKVD was preceded by the early anti-Finnish campaigns of 1935–36 which began with the Karelian Regional Committee of the Communist Party of the Soviet Union declaring that "Finnish bourgeois nationalists" must be destroyed. Two prominent Finnish-Soviet politicians Edvard Gylling and Kustaa Rovio were arrested in 1935. Many of the early targets were Red Guards veterans of the Finnish Civil War who now lived in the Soviet Union. Local communist party organizations and military units were reorganized as a part of the purges, and many Finns were expelled from the party. In late 1935, three leaders of the Säde agricultural commune were arrested and their families were exiled to the north of Karelia.

== NKVD operation ==
The preparations for the operation started immediately after NKVD Order No. 00447 had been signed in March 1937, although it officially began on 5 August 1937. In the first month, 728 people were arrested. The Karelian troikas and dvoikas were given quotas how many people could be arrested and how many executed. In January 1938, 5,340 people had been arrested, and a new quota of 700 arrests of whom 500 could be executed, was given. The mass arrests continued until 10 August 1938.

The Karelian authorities specifically alleged that Edvard Gylling had "reinforced the enemy lines" by recruiting Finnish Canadian and Finnish American immigrants through the Resettlement Agency. At least 739 Finns who had moved from North America to the Soviet Union were repressed in 1937 and 1938, although the number could be higher according to historian Irina Takala. Almost all North American Finns were found guilty of "counter-revolutionary activity" under Article 58 of the Soviet penal code.

Different estimations range from 8,000 to 25,000 of Finns killed during all of Stalin-era repressions. Finns made up only 3% of the population of the Karelian ASSR, but made up more than 40% of the victims of the Great Purge in Karelia. Mass graves of Finnish victims are located in Sandarmokh and Krasny Bor.

Outside of Karelia, especially the Murmansk Finns were heavily persecuted and the Finnish population almost completely perished in the area. 3,000 Finns were executed in Leningrad as well.

== Research ==
Russian historian Irina Takala of Petrozavodsk State University has researched the subject in detail since the 1990s. She has commented that the FSB has limited access to relevant archives in the recent years.

In 2020, the Finnish Literature Society launched a new research project Memories of the Stalinist repression which will include interviews of the relatives of the victims.

Between 2020 and 2025, a research project conducted by the National Archives of Finland examined the fate of Finns in Russia between 1917 and 1964, with emphasis on the Great Terror of 1937–1938. As a result of the project, more accurate estimates of the scale of the persecutions were obtained. The project compiled a database containing personal information on approximately 38,000 Finnish citizens and identified nearly 6,200 who were convicted during the persecutions of 1937–1938, of whom more than 4,700 were executed. The researchers estimated that a further 1,000–2,000 victims remain unidentified, bringing the total number of convicted Finnish citizens to 7,200–8,200. When Ingrian Finns are included, the total number is estimated at 11,000–12,000 people.

== See also ==
- The Eternal Road (film) – a depiction of the NKVD purge of Finns
- List of Finnish MPs imprisoned in Russia
