= The Hoito =

Restaurant in Ontario, Canada

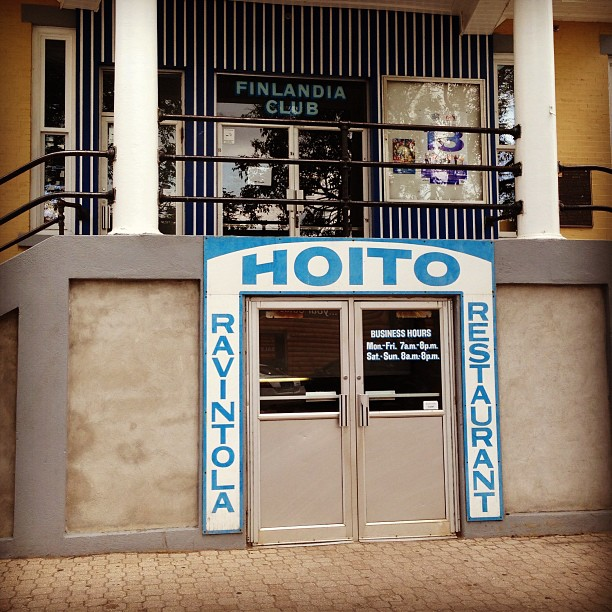
- Doors to The Hoito Restaurant
- Interactive map of The Hoito

Restaurant information
- Established: 1918
- Food type: Finnish
- Location: 314 Bay Street, Thunder Bay, Ontario, Canada

The Hoito Restaurant (often referred to as “The Hoito” by locals) is a Finnish-Canadian restaurant in Thunder Bay, Ontario, Canada established in 1918 and housed in the bottom floor of the historic Finnish Labour Temple. The Hoito operated continuously on 314 Bay Street, in the historic Bay & Algoma neighbourhood, for more than a century until closing due to the COVID-19 pandemic in March 2020. It was one of the oldest co-operatively owned and operated restaurants in Canada. It had been anticipated that the restaurant would reopen in early summer 2022. However, during the early evening hours of December 22, 2021, amid on-going renovations, smoke could be seen billowing from the rooftop, and The Hoito restaurant suffered extensive damage when a massive fire burned through the Finnish Labour Temple building above. The building is now gone, with new construction underway.

== Beginnings ==
The name "Hoito" is Finnish for the word "care". The idea for the restaurant came about in a logging camp outside Nipigon, Ontario. IWW union organizer A.T. Hill had come to organize the camp into the union and promote the new Finnish-Canadian socialist newspaper Vapaus (Freedom). After winning some improvements in the camp, the workers expressed a concern that while being able to find cheap accommodation in the city of Port Arthur (now Thunder Bay), they were unable to find reasonably priced, home-cooked meals. The request to open a co-operative restaurant was taken to the board of directors of the Finnish Labour Temple and approved. 59 people pooled their money together in the form of 5-dollar “comrade loans”. Union organizer A.T. Hill was chosen as the restaurant's first manager.

For several decades, workers in the restaurant belonged to the Industrial Workers of the World (IWW) union and later to the Canadan Teollisuusunionistinen Kannatusliitto (CTKL or Support League of Canadian Industrial Unionists), the Finnish section of the union, and not, as is often mistaken, to the Communist Party of Canada. The IWW was active in the bushcamps in Northwestern Ontario primarily among Finnish-Canadian bushworkers, and effectively operated as a radical alternative to their rivals in the communist-led unions. The Finnish Labour Temple itself was the Canadian administration for the IWW for a number of years.

When IWW organizer J. A. McDonald visited the Hoito and Finnish Labour Temple in 1926, "it was the activities of the women that he was most impressed by. According to McDonald all the waitresses were members of the IWW, and one of the cooks was a woman who had served a year in a Finnish prison for her activities on behalf of the Reds during the Finnish Revolution of 1918.".

== Food ==
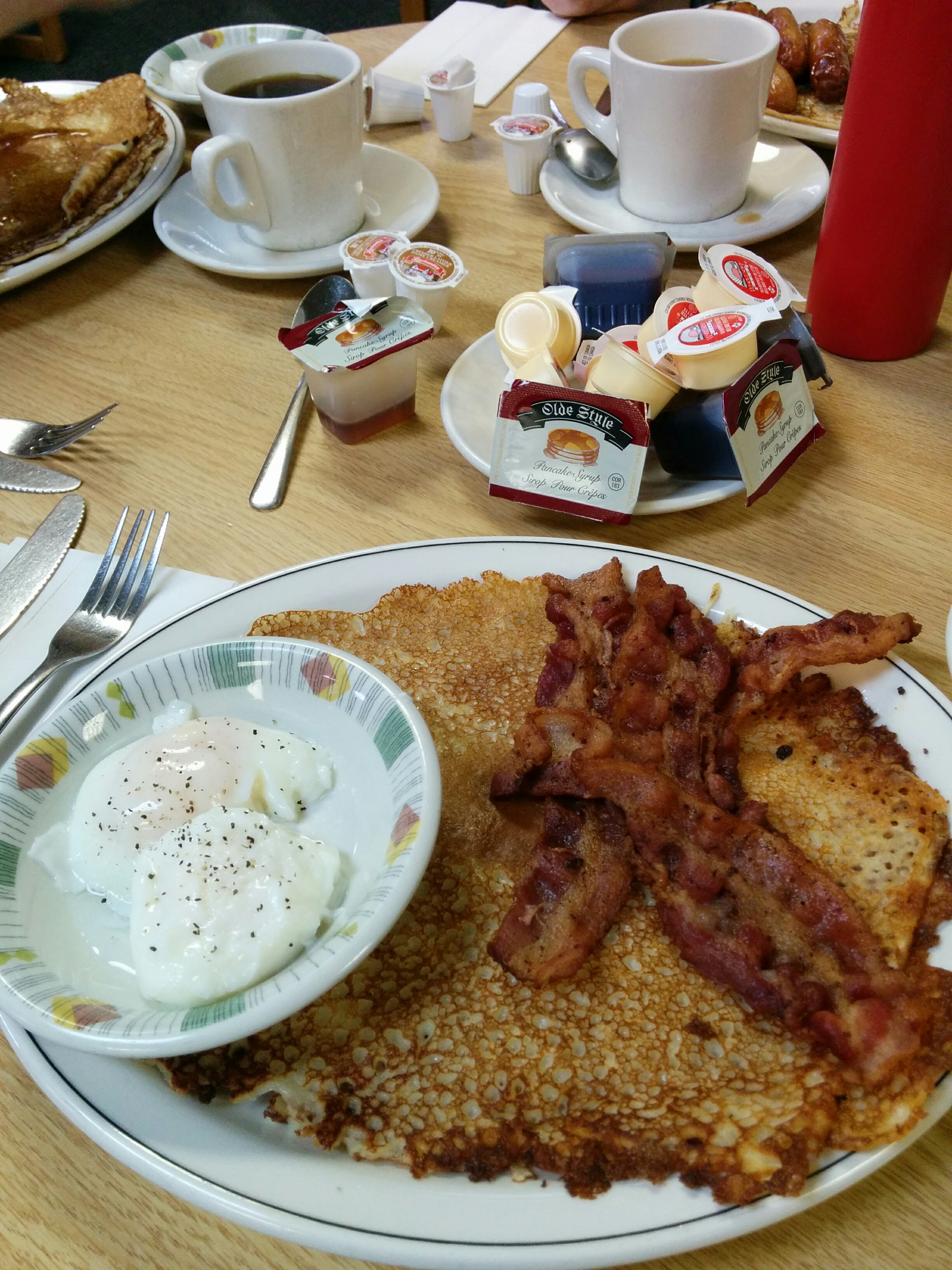
Hoito pancakes with eggs and bacon

The Hoito Restaurant is best known for the Finnish pancakes they serve to their customers. Thin and the size of a large dinner plate, they are eaten with maple syrup, strawberry sauce or a sprinkle of sugar. Known as lettu or lätty in Finnish, depending on what part of Finland one is from, they are one of the traditional Finnish foods served at the Hoito. Other items prepared include viili (a sour yogurt), Karelian pasty (karjalanpiirakka), Karelian hot pot (karjalanpaisti), salmon-potato casserole (lohiperunalaatikko), pulla (sweet cardamon bread), salted fish (suolakala), rice pudding (riisipuuro), fish soup (kalakeitto), pea soup (hernekeitto) and Vienna sausage (nakki).

Another well-known dish is mojakka, a stew of beef, potatoes and turnips that is seasoned with allspice. The word mojakka is not a Finnish word at all, but a term that was coined by the Hoito staff themselves.

== Co-operative restaurant ==
Since the restaurant began in 1918, it has operated as a consumer co-operative along Rochdale Principles. Customers can buy yearly membership cards that enable them to vote at the Finnish Labour Temple annual general membership meeting, where the board of directors is chosen for one to two year terms. Workers maintain a degree of workers' self-management and organize their own work schedules.

== Customers ==
The Hoito is a popular place with locals in Thunder Bay, with line-ups for breakfast on Saturday and Sunday mornings. Clientele from all walks of life can be found at the Hoito, ranging from students and blue collar workers, to visiting celebrities, politicians and newsmakers.

Until the 1970s, the dining room featured long communal tables, and customers were able to buy meal tickets. Today, the restaurant operates in a more conventional way, with individual tables and several small communal tables.
