= Irina Takala =

Russian historian (born 1955)

Irina Takala (Russian: Ирина Рейевна Такала; born December 28, 1955) is a Russian historian and educator. Her interests include history of Finland and Karelia, Finland–Russia relations, Stalinism, and alcoholism in Russia.

== Education and research ==
In 1978 she graduated from Petrozavodsk State University specializing in history. In 1984 she earned Ph.D. with thesis "Россия и общественная мысль Финляндии (20-е – начало 60-х гг. XIX в.)" ["Russia and Finnish Social Thought (1820s – early 1860s)"].

She started her research on Stalinist persecution of Finns in the early 1990s, when many (but not all) KGB archives were opened under Boris Yeltsin. She has become interested in this, because more than 10 members of her immediate family were victims to varying degrees. Among them were her grandfather of Finnish descent, Väinö Takala, and her great-grandfather, Aapo Hämäläinen, both of whom were shot. However under Vladimir Putin they were closed again, and materials about victims are available now only to close relatives.

== Books ==
- 2002: Финны в Карелии и в России: История возникновения и гибели диаспоры
- 2002: «Веселие Руси». История алкогольной проблемы в России
- 2014: (with Alexey Golubev Alexey Golubev) Search for a Socialist El Dorado: Finnish Immigration to Soviet Karelia from the United States and Canada in the 1930s. East Lansing, MI: Michigan State University Press; Winnipeg, MB: University of Manitoba Press
  - 2019: (Russian translation, expanded with new material): В поисках социалистического Эльдорадо: североамериканские финны в Советской Карелии 1930-х годов
- 2021: Taistelua ja kuolemaa: Neuvosto-Karjalan suomalaiset 1920- ja 1930-luvulla
  The book is about the history of Finns who emigrated to the Soviet Union from Finland and North America in the 1920s and 1930s, in search for better future. However the Great Terror that happened the second half of 1930s brought tragedy for them.
