= Saint Urho =

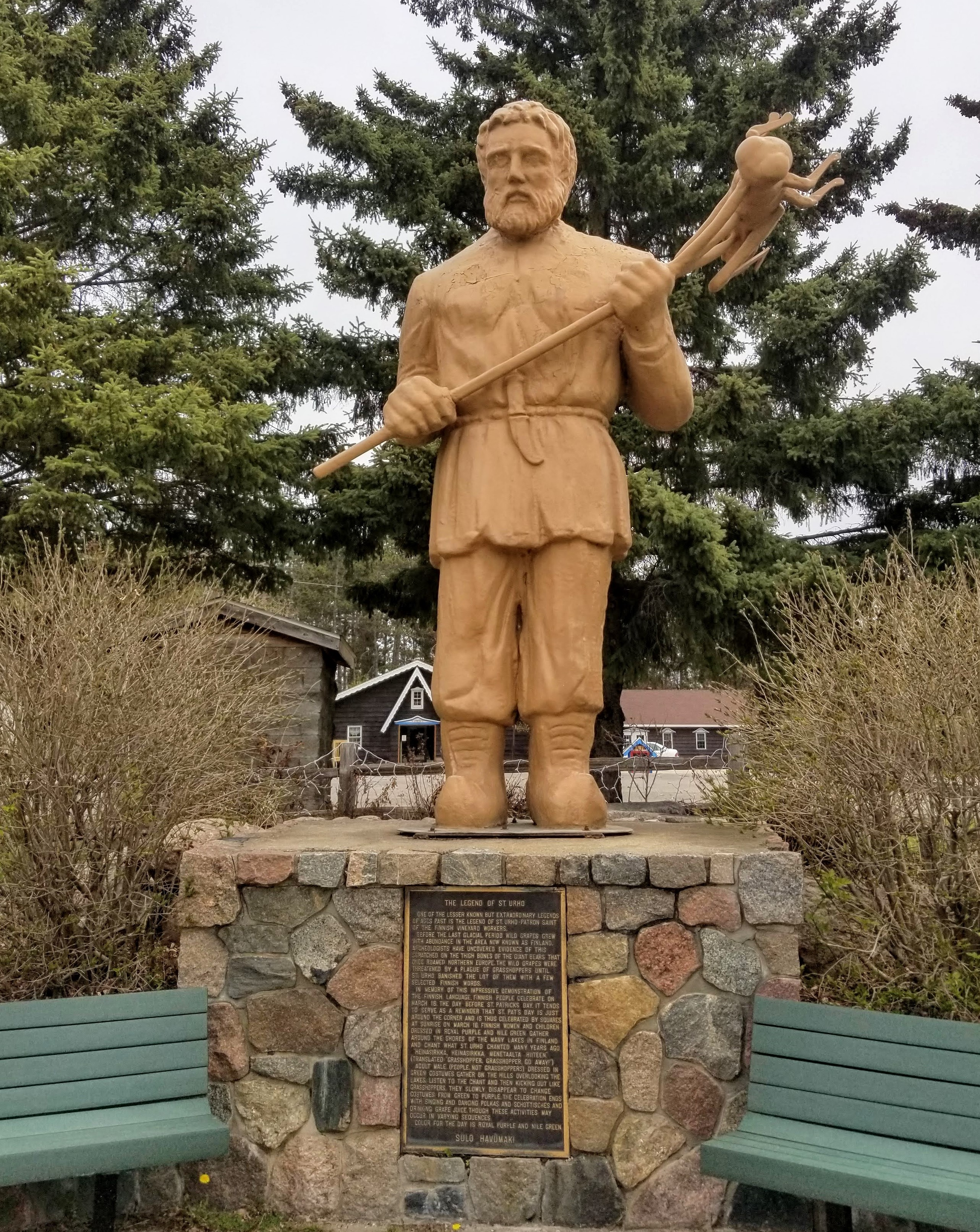
- Sculpture of St. Urho in Menahga, Minnesota (2020)
- Created by: Richard Mattson and Gene McCavic Richard Seppälä
- Birthplace: Finland
- Feast Day: March 16
- Known for: Saving the Finnish grape crops from a frog or grasshopper plague

In-universe information
- Full name: Urho
- Gender: Male
- Occupation: Saint
- Origin: Northern Minnesota
- Nationality: Finnish

Saint Urho (Finnish: Pyhä Urho [ˈpyhæ ˈurho]) is a fictional saint of Finland, created and elaborated by Finnish Americans in Northern Minnesota in the 1950s, to celebrate their heritage and extend celebrations of Saint Patrick's Day. His celebration day is set to March 16, the day before the March 17 feast day of Saint Patrick. Saint Patrick's feast day is celebrated by Irish Americans, of whom there are also many in Minnesota.

== Creation ==
The legend of Saint Urho was the invention of a Finnish American named Richard Mattson, who worked at Ketola's Department Store in Virginia, Minnesota in the spring of 1956. Mattson later recounted that he invented St. Urho when he was questioned by coworker Gene McCavic about the Finns' lack of a saint like the Irish St. Patrick, whose feat of casting the snakes out of Ireland is remembered on St. Patrick's Day. In fact, the patron saint of Finland (except for the Orthodox Church of Finland) is the bishop Saint Henry, whose feast day occurs on January 19.

According to the original "Ode to St. Urho" written by Gene McCavic and Richard Mattson, St. Urho was supposed to have cast "tose 'Rogs" (those frogs) out of Finland by the power of his loud voice, which he obtained by drinking "feelia sour" (sour whole milk) and eating "kala mojakka" (fish soup). The selection of the name Urho as the saint's name was probably influenced by the accession of Urho Kekkonen to the presidency of Finland in 1956. (Similarly, St. Urho's Pub in Töölö, Helsinki, is known to have received its name from Urho Kekkonen and has nothing to do with Saint Urho). Urho in the Finnish language also has the meaning of hero or simply brave.

The original "Ode to St. Urho" identified St. Urho's Day as taking place on May 24. Later the date was changed to March 16, the day before St. Patrick's Day so the Finns could start drinking green beer a day before the Irish. St. Urho's feast is supposed to be celebrated by wearing the colors Royal Purple and Nile Green. Other details of the invented legend also changed, apparently under the influence of Sulo Havumäki, a psychology professor at Bemidji State University in Bemidji, Minnesota. The legend now states that St. Urho drove away grasshoppers (rather than frogs) from Finland using the incantation "Heinäsirkka, heinäsirkka, mene täältä helveteen!" ("Grasshopper, grasshopper, go from hence to Hell!"), thus saving the Finnish grape crops.

Another version of the modern celebration of St. Urho's Day is that it was created by Kenneth Brist of Chippewa Falls, Wisconsin. Brist, a high school teacher, was teaching in the Upper Peninsula of Michigan in the early to mid-1950s in an area largely populated by people of Finnish heritage. He and his friends concocted March 16 as St. Urho's Day so that they had two days to celebrate, the next day being St. Patrick's Day.

== Ode to Saint Urho ==
Side by side comparison
The original

Ooksi kooksi coolama vee
Santia Urho is ta poy for me!
He sase out ta hoppers as pig as pirds.
Neffer peefor haff I hurd tose words!

He reely tolt tose pugs of kreen
Braffest Finn I effer seen
Some celebrate for St. Pat unt hiss nakes
Putt Urho poyka kot what it takes.

He kot tall and trong from feelia sour
Unt ate kala moyakka effery hour.
Tat's why tat kuy could sase toes peetles
What krew as thick as chack bine neetles.

So let's give a cheer in hower pest vay
On Sixteenth of March, St. Urho's Tay.

English translation

Ooksi kooksi coolama vee [1,2,3,5]
Saint Urho is the boy for me!
He chased out the hoppers as big as birds
Never before have I heard those words!

He really told those bugs of green
Bravest Finn I ever seen
Some celebrate for St. Pat and his snakes
But Urho poika (boy) got what it takes

He got strong and tall from viili sour
And ate kalamojakka (fish soup) every hour
That's why that guy could chase those beetles
What grew as thick as jack pine needles

So lets give a cheer in our best way
On the sixteenth of March, St. Urho's Day.

== Popularity ==
Kenneth Brist promoted the "annual cancellation" [or was it annual celebration, need citation from Chippewa Falls Telegram, 1970] of the St. Urho's Day Parade in Chippewa Falls with advertisements in the Chippewa Herald Telegram and by teaching his high school students about the legend of St. Urho.

The "Ode to St. Urho" has been modified to reflect these changes in the feast day and legend. The Ode is written in a self-parodying form of English as spoken by Finnish immigrants. There is also a "Ballad of St. Urho" written by Sally Karttunen.

There are St. Urho fan clubs in Canada and Finland as well as the U.S., and the festival is celebrated on March 16 in many American and Canadian communities with Finnish roots. The original statue of St. Urho is located in Menahga, Minnesota. Another interesting chainsaw-carved St. Urho statue is located in Finland, Minnesota. A 2001 book, The Legend of St. Urho by Joanne Asala, presents much of the folklore surrounding St. Urho and includes an essay by Richard Mattson on the "birth" of St. Urho.

On March 16, 1999, in Kaleva, Michigan a large Metal Sculpture of a Grasshopper was dedicated in honor of St. Urho's day. Kaleva is a community settled by Finnish immigrants in 1900. Kaleva is named after the Kalevala, the Epic Finnish story about the Creation of the Earth.

Many places with mixed populations of Finnish and Irish have an annual St. Urho's day event on the night before St. Patrick's Day. Butte, Montana holds such a celebration each March 16.

Thunder Bay, Ontario, Canada, just northeast of Minnesota, is another location where St. Urho's Day is joyfully celebrated on the weekend nearest to March 16. Historically, the celebration was held at the Finlandia Club in the Finnish Labour Temple, until it burned down in 2022. But the local Finnish community still holds a parade, starting near the former site of the Finlandia Club, hauling a grasshopper slung on a pole through the streets to a celebration with food, music and dance.

Although St. Urho's Day is not widely known or celebrated in Finland, it has been celebrated in Turku since 1987. At the University of Turku students studying Folkloristics, Comparative Religion and Ethnology have organized a St. Urho's Day play yearly since 1987.

== Saint Urho Days Gallery ==
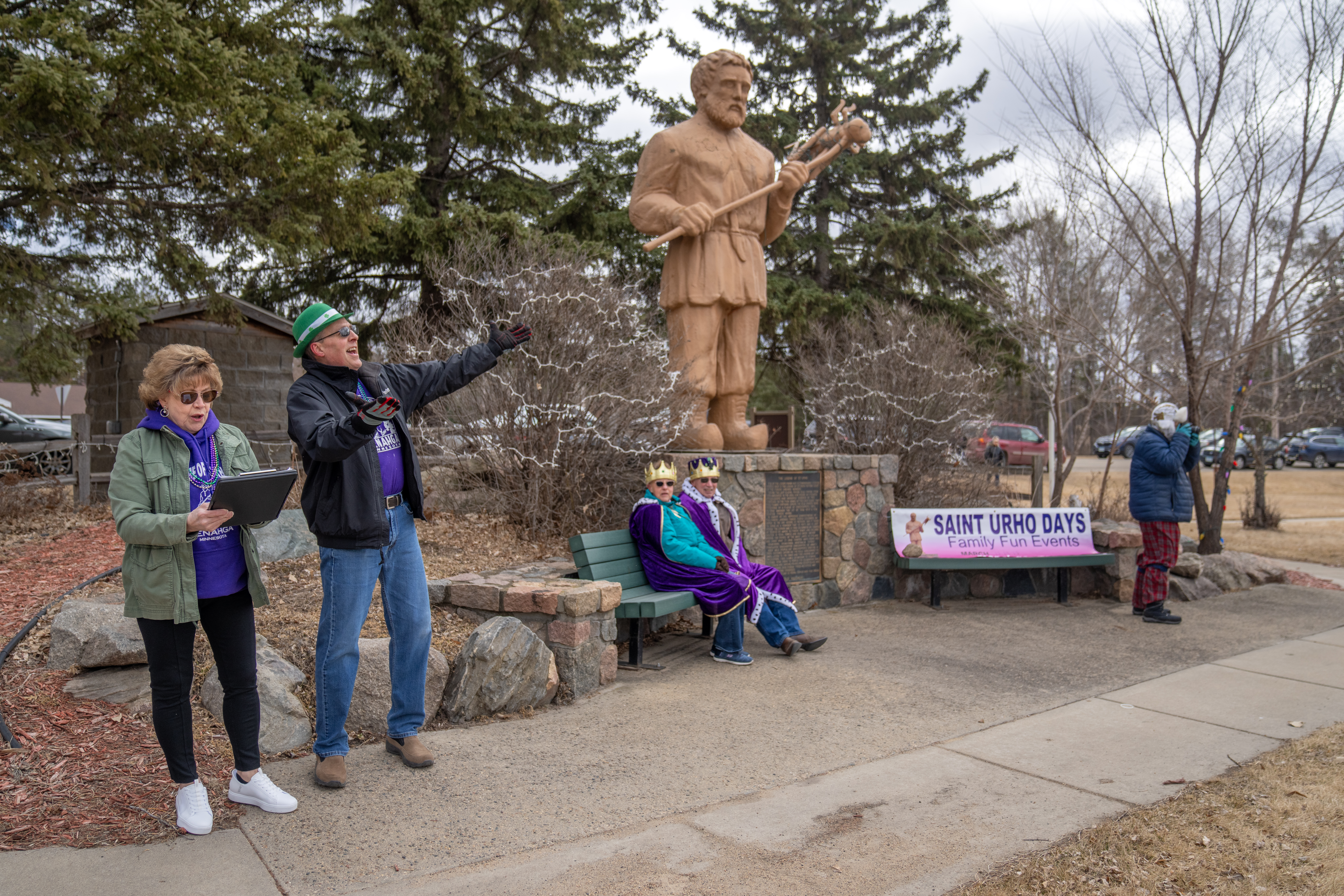
Mayor, Elizabeth Olson introduces the Changing of the Guards at the St Urho statue

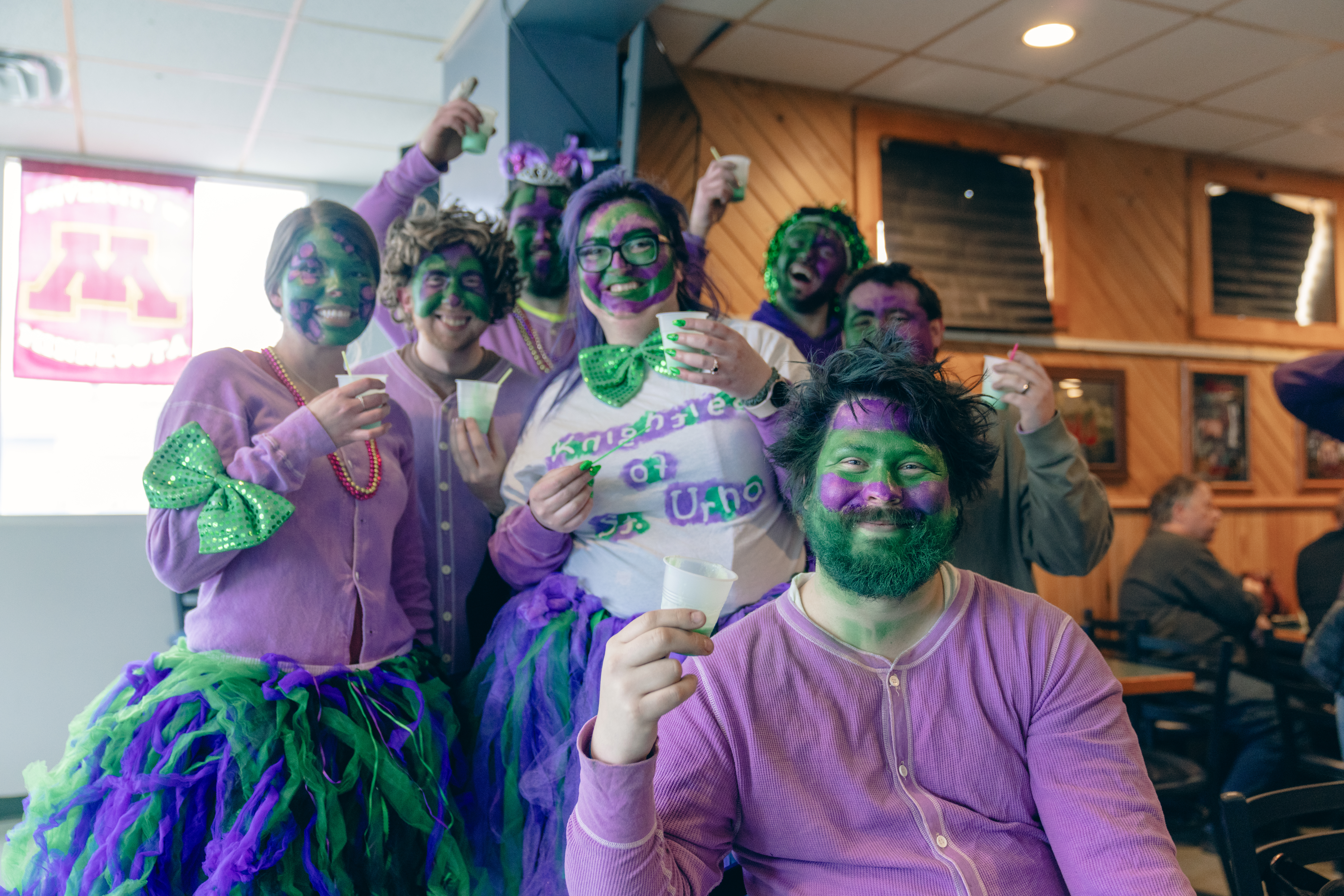
The Nytes of St Urho

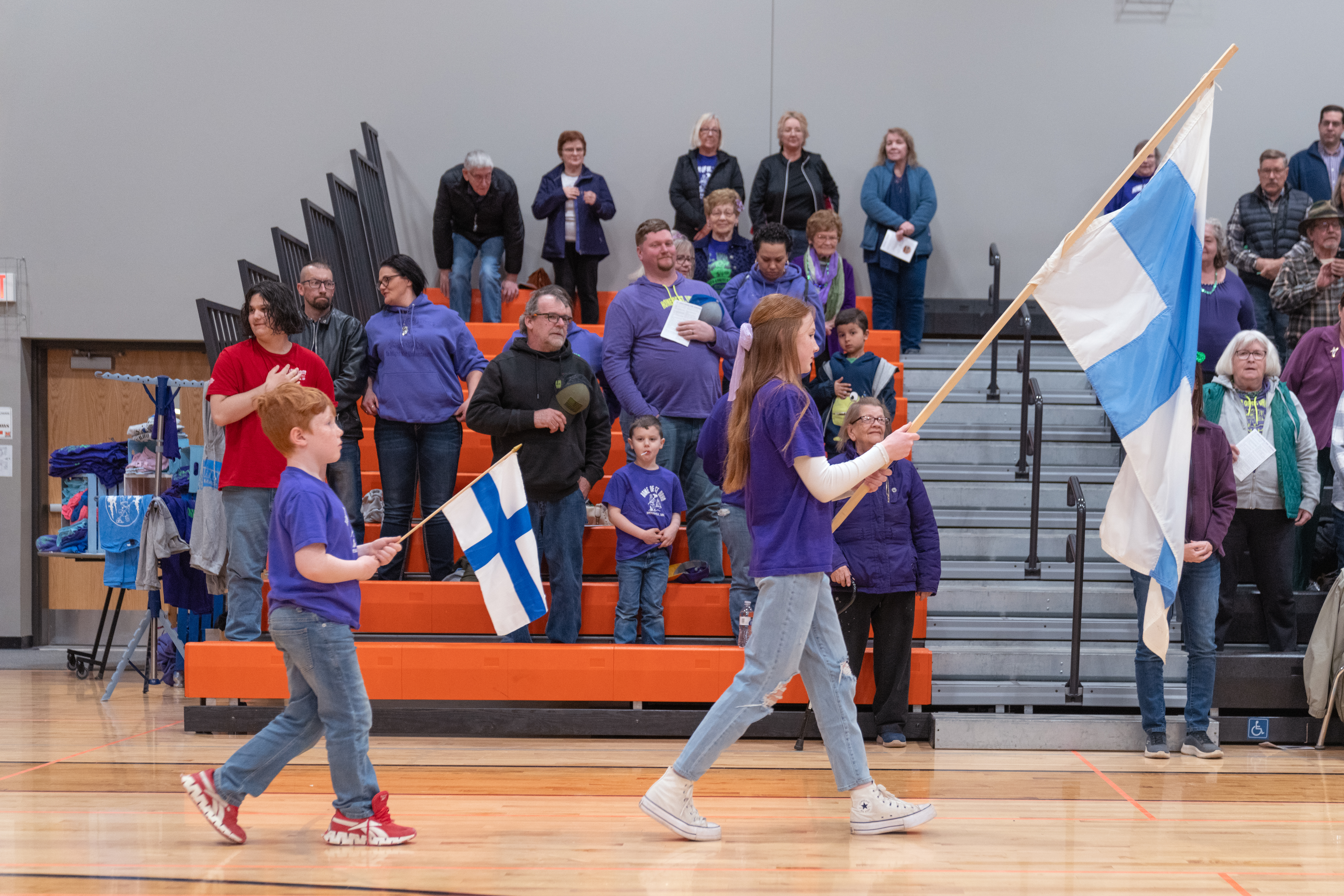
Flag Presentation at Opening Ceremonies

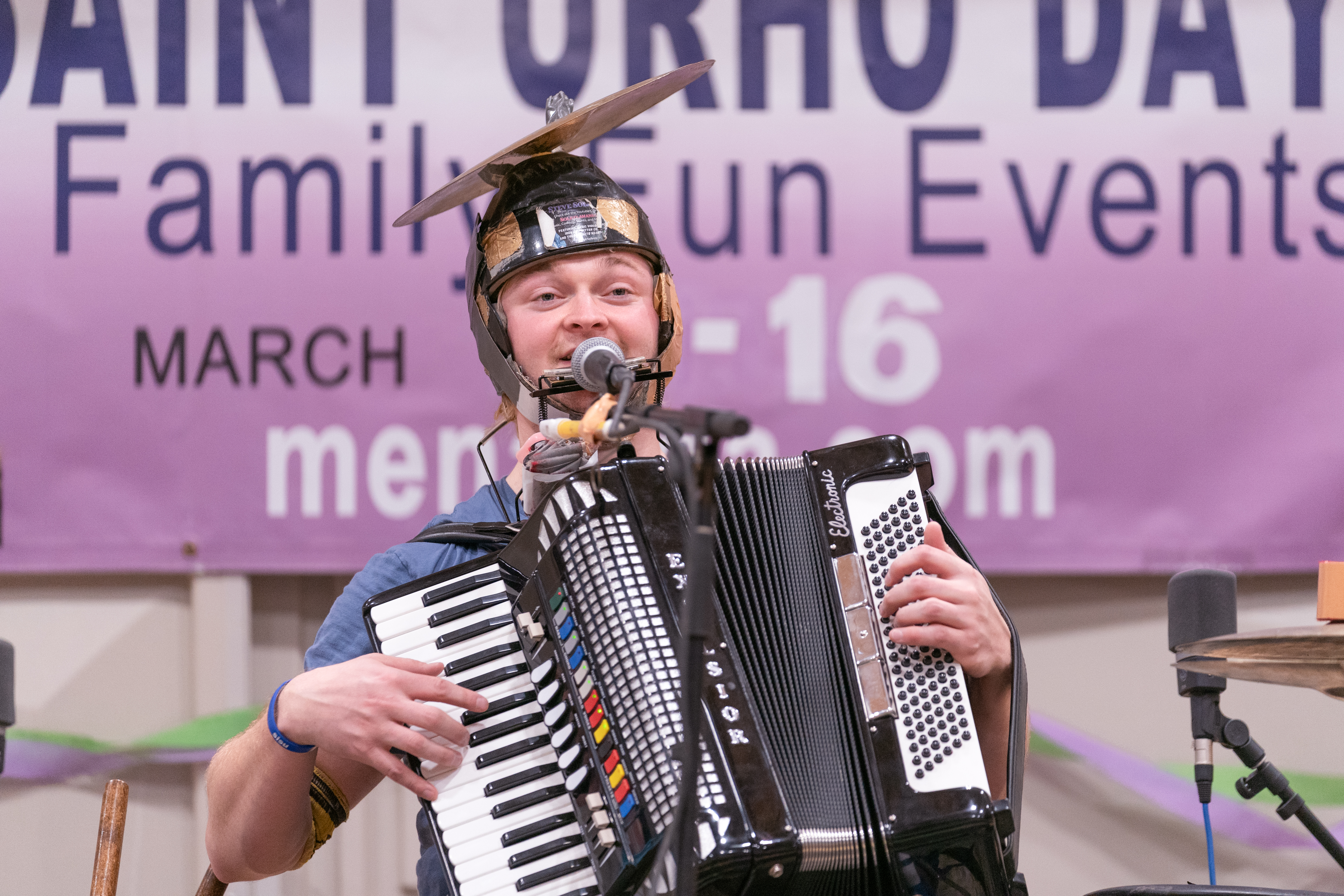
One-Man Band playing at the Opening Ceremony

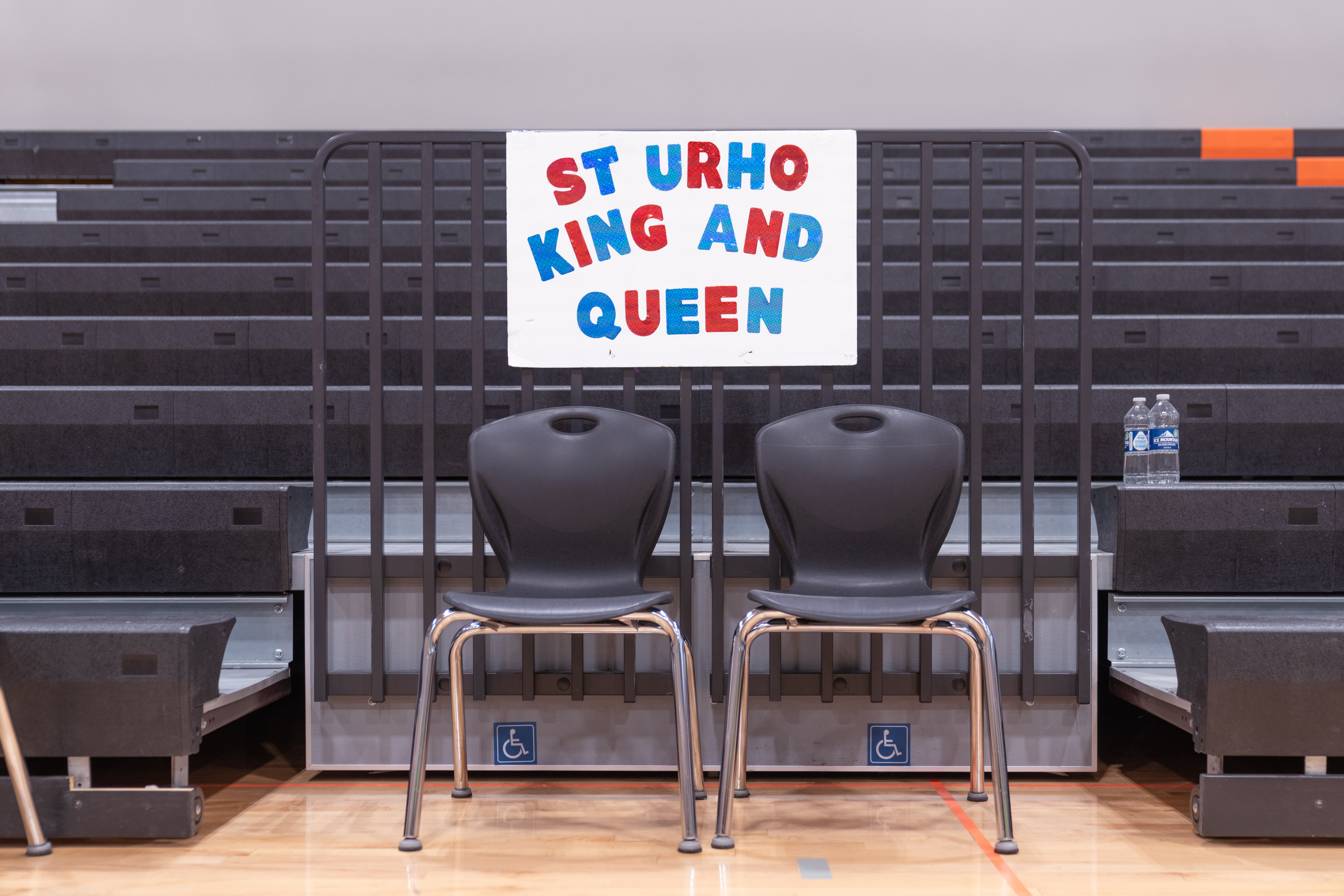
Sign for the St Urho's Day King and Queen at St Urho's Day Opening Ceremonies

== See also ==
- Culture of Finnish Americans
- Heikki Lunta
