= Seattle Commune in the Soviet Union =

Coordinates: 46.425°N 41.181°E

The Seattle Commune (known as Seiatel in Russian, Kylväjä in Finnish, and also known as Sower and the American Commune), was in the Soviet Union about 150 miles (240 km) southeast of Rostov-on-Don. The founders and early members of the commune were mostly Finnish Americans but the membership came to include a Russian-American majority and others as well. Founded in 1922, the commune was a victim of Joseph Stalin's Great Terror in 1937-38 and abolished by the Soviet government in 1940. Although suffering from many hardships and defections, the Seattle Commune was notable for its agricultural and financial success, contrary to the history of several dozen communes created in the Soviet Union in the 1920s by American and other foreign enthusiasts for communism.

== Background ==
The October Revolution in Russia in 1917 resulted in the creation of the first communist state in the world. Communism was feared and violently opposed by western governments, but celebrated by some, including socialists, labor organizations, and industrial workers. Between 1917 and the onset of World War II in 1939, 70,000 to 80,000 foreigners moved to the Soviet Union to live and work. The immigrants included Finns and Russians who had previously left the country to live abroad, especially in the United States. Many of the emigrants were skilled workers.

Out of the chaos and the economic disruption of the Russian Civil War (1917-1922) came the pragmatic New Economic Policy (NEP) of Vladimir Lenin, a temporary retreat from the doctrinaire communist policies he had previously attempted to impose. The NEP permitted private ownership and control of most small-scale agriculture, trade, and industry. Farmers were permitted to own and cultivate land.

The NEP imposed controls on visitors, but encouraged organized immigration, especially from the United States where three million former Russian citizens resided. The new policy required that all immigrants be organized into communes whose members were to live in a designated place with a development plan and resources to support themselves for at least two years. The Russian government created an organization, the Society for Technical Aid to Soviet Russia (STASR), in New York City to supervise and facilitate immigration. In 1925, despite early failures due to disorganization, 33 foreign communes with 3,249 members were in operation in the Soviet Union. Twenty-five of the communes were created by Americans; four were created by Canadians. The foreign communes made up only a small percentage of the 4,000 communes created in the Soviet Union in the 1920s and 1930s.

Among the communes approved by the Soviet Government was the Seattle Commune ("Seiatel" in Russian) located east of the city of Salsk in Rostov Oblast. The Seattle Commune would be durable and successful in the agricultural communes.

== Seattle Commune ==
The genesis of the Seattle Commune was in Seattle, Washington in 1921. A group of 30 founders, mostly Finnish-Americans and members of the Communist Party received permission from the Soviet Union to emigrate and form a commune. In 1922, three leaders journeyed to the Soviet Union in find land. The government granted them an 18 year lease on 5,201 ha (12,850 acres) of steppe grassland. Several other communes made up of Americans were founded in the same region.

The emigrants were not poor. Joining the commune required each member to contribute at least five hunded dollars (7,500 in 2021 dollars). The commune's initial capital amounted to 200,000 dollars (more than 3 million in 2021 dollars). The Soviet government also stipulated that the commune members bring two years of supplies to the Soviet Union. The first group venturing to the Soviet Union numbered either 87 or 88 persons including 30 members and their families. Twenty of the members were farmers and many others had technical skills. Few of the migrants spoke Russian. They arrived to a chaotic region, devastated by civil war; their farming equipment took months to arrive. The swampy site they initially selected for their residences was malaria-ridden. Seventy percent of the colonists caught the disease. They soon moved to a drier site. Moreover, although the soil was excellent for farming, summers were hot, winters were cold, and the steppe wind was fierce. The local peasants, some of whom were displaced by the Americans, were antagonistic and banditry was a problem.

The commune grew despite the numerous difficulties of the early years. Between 1922 and 1927, 334 persons arrived to join the commune and 134 departed. The commune became more family oriented, with a larger number of children. Disputes between the Finnish-Americans and the Russian-Americans in the commune was one source of controversy; malaria continued to be a major problem. Living conditions were spartan. Bernstein and Cherny identified that those who remained had a high level of "ideological commitment" to communism and the Soviet Union.

"Unlike all other foreign communes, Seattle remained and, eventually, thrived." The residents combined communal living with modern technology. The commune had electricity and telephones in the 1920s when not many rural Americans -- and very few Russians -- had those conveniences. The population increased from 210 to 407 between 1927 and 1932 and in 1936 the population reached 728. The population grew despite the departure of most of the Finnish-Americans from the commune in 1930 to create a new agricultural commune called Hiilisuo. The departing Finnish-Americans joined several thousand Finns who had immigated to Soviet Karelia.

During Joseph Stalin's Great Terror of 1937-38, about 70 commune members were imprisoned, including the leadership which "vanished in the night," presumably sentenced to the gulag or executed. The Finnish-Americans were a primary target as they were suspected of being agents of Finland or the United States. In 1940, the Soviet government officially abolished the commune, transforming it into a collective farm named after Stalin and confiscating all the machinery for collective use in the region. In Robert G. Wesson's view "the communes did not fit into the orthodox Marxist scheme, which views society as evolving as a whole, with communism to come not through the will and unselfishness of utopian brotherhoods but from the totality of progress. Still less did the communes fit into the Stalinist state with its increasing demands for total conformity."

== 21st century ==
Remnants of Seattle Commune survive. The first malarial settlement, called Seyatel Yuzhnyi, is near a small river; the second Seyatel Severnyi, a small economically depressed village, is on higher ground 6 miles (9.7 km) north. A few large buildings remain and photos of the commune are posted in the village school.
