= Markus Paatelainen =

Finnish footballer (born 1983)

Personal information
- Date of birth: 23 January 1983 (age 43)
- Place of birth: Valkeakoski, Finland
- Position: Midfielder

Senior career*
Years	Team	Apps	(Gls)
2003	AC Allianssi	8	(0)
2004	KooTeePee	26	(5)
2004–2005	Aberdeen	0	(0)
2005–2007	Cowdenbeath	45	(15)
2007–2008	Inverness Caledonian Thistle	22	(3)
2009–2010	FC Honka	23	(3)
2011–'	IFK Mariehamn	0	(0)

International career
- Finland U21
- * Club domestic league appearances and goals

Markus Paatelainen (born 23 January 1983) is a retired Finnish football midfielder, who last played alongside his brother Mikko for IFK Mariehamn.

He has represented Finland at under-21 level.

== Career ==
Paatelainen joined Aberdeen in January 2005, but was released at the end of the season without breaking into the first team. He joined Cowdenbeath, managed by his elder brother, Mixu, in September 2005 and quickly settled in as a first team regular. In February 2006 he suffered a serious injury away to Elgin City which almost resulted in him losing his right leg after a delay in getting him to hospital. However, after two months out he returned to the side in a 2–2 draw with Queens Park and the helped Cowdenbeath to promotion as champions of the Scottish Third Division after a 2–1 win over Elgin City. Markus secured the Scottish 3rd Division Player of the Year award as well as a host of club awards.

He joined Inverness Caledonian Thistle in January 2007, and saw his first action as a substitute in Inverness' 3–0 victory over Hibernian on 21 January 2007. He scored his first goal for Inverness in a 3–2 defeat to Kilmarnock. He scored his second goal the following week in a 3–1 defeat to Dunfermline Athletic. Inverness Caledonian Thistle terminated his contract on 8 October 2008.

On 12 November 2008 Paatelainen signed a two-year-contract with FC Honka of the Finnish Premier Division.

Another elder brother, Mikko is also a footballer and played alongside Markus at Cowdenbeath for part of the successful 2005/06 season. His father is Matti Paatelainen.
