= Urho =

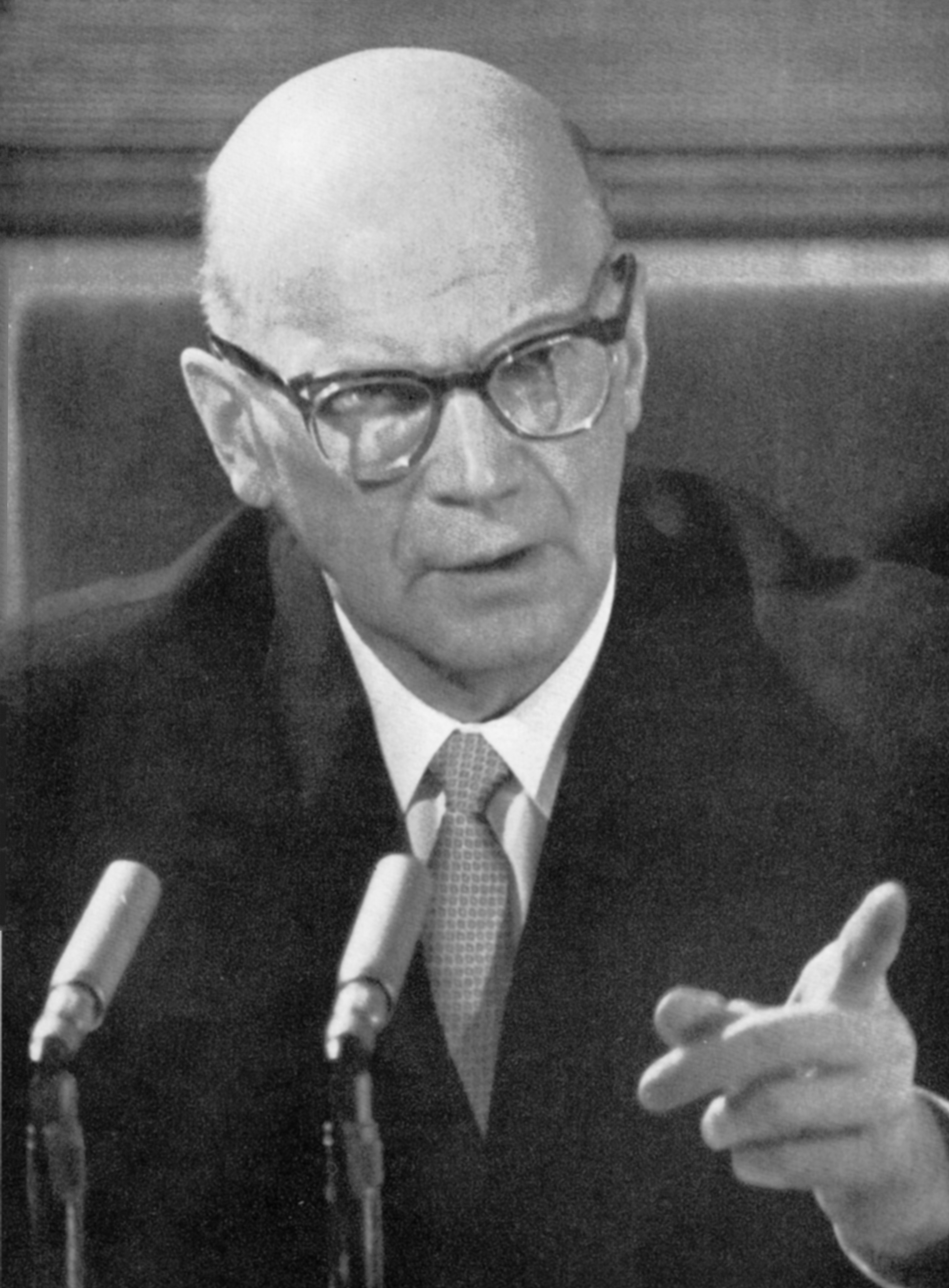
Urho Kekkonen, 8th president of Finland

Urho is a Finnish male given name. It was most popular in the first half of the 20th century. As of 2013 there were more than 12,000 people registered with this name in Finland. The nameday is the 17th of June. It means 'brave' or 'courageous'. A common variation is Urkki.

Some people who have this name include:

- Urho Castrén (1886–1965), a Finnish politician
- Urho Karhumäki (1891–1947), a Finnish poet
- Urho Kekkonen (1900–1986), the eighth President of Finland
- Urho Kujala (born 1957), a Finnish orienteering competitor
- Urho Lehtovaara (1917–1949), a Finnish Air Force aces
- Urho Peltonen (1893–1951), a Finnish athlete
- Urho Sirén (1932–2002), a Finnish cyclist
- Urho Tallgren (1894–1959), a Finnish long-distance runner
- Urho Teräs (1915–1990), a Finnish footballer
- Urho Vaakanainen (born 1999), a Finnish ice hockey player

== Fictional characters ==
- Urho Hietanen, a character from The Unknown Soldier novel by Väinö Linna
- Saint Urho, a fictional saint created and elaborated by Finnish Americans

== See also ==
- Urkki, Finnish magazine established in reference to Urho Kekkonen
