= Mikko Paatelainen =

Finnish footballer (born 1980)

Personal information
- Full name: Mikko Paatelainen
- Date of birth: 27 November 1980 (age 45)
- Place of birth: Valkeakoski, Finland
- Height: 1.85 m (6 ft 1 in)
- Position: Striker

Senior career*
| Years | Team | Apps | (Gls) |
- FC Haka
| 2002–2003 | AC Allianssi | 28 | (3) |
| 2004 | FC KooTeePee | 22 | (3) |
| 2004–2005 | Aberdeen | 0 | (0) |
| 2005–2006 | FF Jaro | 34 | (19) |
| 2006 | → Cowdenbeath (loan) | 8 | (7) |
| 2006–2009 | TPS | 76 | (29) |
| 2010–2011 | IFK Mariehamn | 21 | (8) |
| Total | | 189 | (69) |
- * Club domestic league appearances and goals

Mikko Paatelainen (born 27 November 1980) is a Finnish former professional footballer who played as a striker.

His father is retired footballer and manager Matti Paatelainen.

== Career ==
Paatelainen began his career with FC Haka, moving on to AC Allianssi and FC KooTeePee before joining Scottish side Aberdeen in July 2004. After 10 months at Pittodrie, he returned to Finland without making any first team appearances for the Dons, joining Veikkausliiga side FF Jaro. In August 2005 he scored 5 goals in one game for Jaro, against his former club FC KooTeePee.

In January 2006, Paatelainen joined Scottish side Cowdenbeath on loan, teaming up with his brothers Mixu (then manager) and Markus. He scored 7 goals in 9 games for Cowdenbeath who would be promoted as champions of the Scottish Third Division at the end of the season. He then returned to FF Jaro in preparation for the new summer season in March 2006. In December 2006 Mikko joined TPS, a team that was then coached by his older brother Mixu. Mikko has been an outstanding goalscorer and player throughout his career also being FC TPS Turku's top scorer 2006–07. In 2010 he joined IFK Mariehamn, after three seasons with TPS.
