= Finn hall =

Meeting place of Finnish Americans

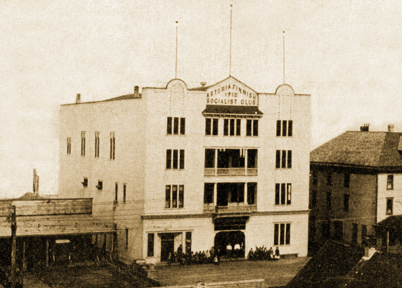
Finnish Socialist Hall, constructed in 1910, Astoria, Oregon

Finn halls or Finnish halls were cultural centers of Finnish diaspora communities and labor organizations in the United States and Canada.

== Notable Finn halls ==
- Finnish Labour Temple, Thunder Bay, Ontario
- Round Finn Hall, Waino, Wisconsin
