= Finnish Americans =

Americans of Finnish birth or descent

Amerikansuomalaiset (Finnish) Amerikafinländare (Swedish)

Total population
- 612,181 (2024 U.S. Census Bureau est.); 0.18% of the U.S. population

Regions with significant populations
- Midwest: 288,178
- West: 184,724
- South: 103,306
- Northeast: 77,014
- Minnesota: 100,545
- Michigan: 94,259
- Washington: 53,599
- California: 48,518
- Wisconsin: 39,698
- Florida: 29,337
- Oregon: 23,510

Languages
- American English · Finnish · Fingelska · Swedish

Related ethnic groups
- Finns · Finnish Canadians · Estonian Americans · Sami Americans · Scandinavian Americans · Findians

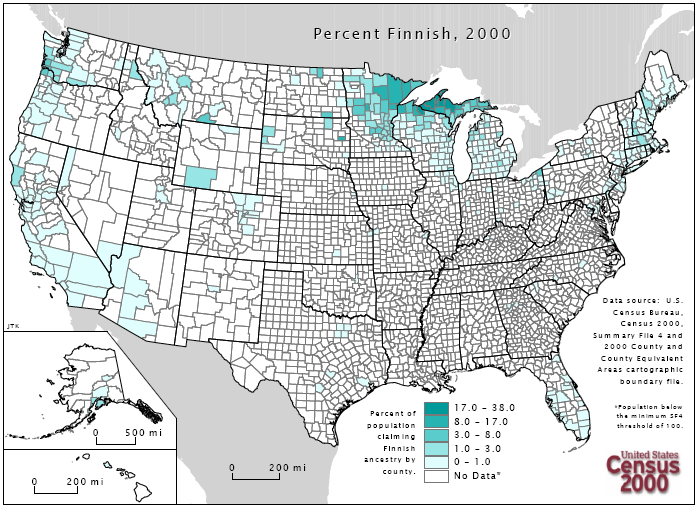
A map showing concentrations of Finnish American ethnicity in the United States.

Finnish Americans (Finnish: amerikansuomalaiset, (Note: Amerikansuomalaiset (lit. "Finns of America") is used for Finns living in North America, i.e., it is used for both Finnish Americans and Finnish Canadians.) pronounced [ˈɑmerikɑnˌsuo̯mɑlɑi̯set]) comprise Americans with ancestral roots in Finland, or Finnish people who immigrated to and reside in the United States. The Finnish-American population is around 650,000. Many Finnish people historically immigrated to the Upper Peninsula of Michigan and the Iron Range of northern Minnesota to work in the mining industry; much of the population in these regions is of Finnish descent.

== History ==
Some Finns, like the ancestors of John Morton, came to the Swedish colony of New Sweden, located in Delaware in the mid-17th century. In Russian America, Finns came to Sitka (when it was still called New Archangel) as migrant workers. Arvid Adolf Etholén was the first Finnish governor of Russian America, and the Lutheran Church was built for Finns.

Finns started coming to the United States in large numbers in the late 19th century, and this movement continued until the mid-20th century. However, there were some Finns in the United States before this; they were instrumental in the development of the New Sweden colony on the Delaware River, later absorbed into New Netherland. Many townships were established by Finnish Americans, including Herman, located in Baraga County, Michigan. The town is named for Herman Keranen, of Puolanka, Finland.

A significant number of Finnish immigrants also settled in northern Minnesota, especially in the Arrowhead Region, along with portions of Aitkin, Crow Wing, and Carlton counties, often working in the region's iron mines. A number of the Finns fleeing the Russification efforts in their native country also immigrated to many of the mill-towns of New England, where they became known for their woodworking skills.

=== First migrants (1640–1870) ===
The first immigrants to North America arrived at the New Sweden colony by the lower Delaware River in 1640. Finland was an integrated part of the Kingdom of Sweden at the time, and a Swedish colony in the New World thus had subjects from Finland as well. In two years' time, the number of Finns in the settlement had grown to fifty, and was increasing. New Sweden changed hands and came under Dutch control in 1655 and the Finnish community, while still small, was growing.

Among the Finnish settlers of New Sweden was Martti Marttinen, who came to North America in 1654 and changed his name to Morton. John Morton, the politician who signed the U.S. Declaration of Independence on behalf of Pennsylvania in 1776, was his great-grandson.

Migration to North America from Finland continued throughout the 17th and 18th centuries, but it was very sporadic in nature and only a few individuals and groups dared make the move. This was largely due to the long distance between Europe and America, and the difficulties associated with crossing it. However, as the Industrial Revolution began with the turn of the 19th century, bringing with it such technological innovations as railroads and steam ships, these obstacles slowly began to disappear.

While the rest of Europe was industrializing, Finland, by now a Grand Duchy of the Russian Empire, was to a great extent excluded from the revolutionary process. The society was largely agrarian, and unemployment was rising, thanks to population growth and the fact that there was now little land left to cultivate in the country. America, on the other hand, possessed abundant natural resources but lacked a workforce.

Rural life in Finland during the 1860s seemed doomed to remain laborious, stunted, and forever at the mercy of unpredictable weather. In 1867, a severe crop failure in Finland drove masses of Finns, especially from rural Ostrobothnia, to migrate into Norway, from where they later moved to the United States and Canada.

==== Religion ====
The Laestadian Finns longed for a rural way of life and religious toleration which they believed they would find in America. Thus, a group of Laestadian preachers and their followers immigrated to the Upper Peninsula of Michigan, bringing their faith with them. In 1873 the Finnish Laestadians started their own congregation at Calumet, Michigan. By 1906 the Laestadian or Apostolic Lutheran movement in America had 68 churches and a communicant body of over 8,000. The denomination was a significant minority within the Finnish Lutheran community in the Upper Peninsula of Michigan. Most Finnish immigrants at the time joined the Finnish Evangelical Lutheran Church of America, which eventually became part of the Evangelical Lutheran Church in America and remains in Calumet, Michigan, alongside various Apostolic (Laestadian) Lutheran churches.

=== The Great Migration (1870–1930) ===
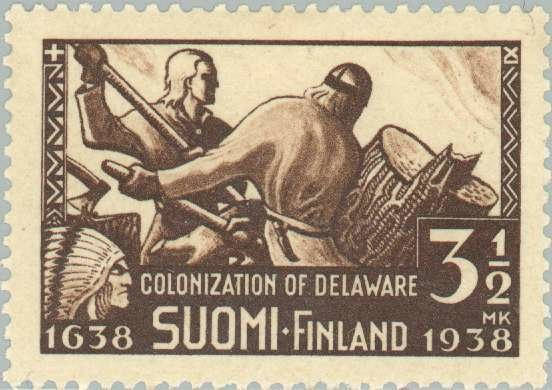
1938 stamp depicting the ″colonization of Delaware″

The years between 1870 and 1930 are sometimes referred to as the Great Migration of Finns to North America. In the 1870s, there were only 3,000 migrants from Finland, but their number rapidly grew thereafter. New migrants often sent letters home, describing their life in the New World, and this encouraged more and more people to leave and try their luck in America. Rumours began of the acres of land that could be cleared into vast productive fields, and the opportunity to earn "a barrel of American dollars" in mines, factories, and railroads.

There were also professional recruiters, or agents, employed by mining and shipping companies, who encouraged Finns to move to the United States. More than 90% of the Finnish immigrants lived in urban centers. This recruitment activity was frowned upon by the authorities of the Grand Duchy, and it was mostly done in secret. It was eventually brought to an end in the late 1880s by legislation in the United States, but the decade still saw a 12-fold increase in the number of Finnish migrants compared to the previous decade, as 36,000 Finns left their home country for North America.

The movement was strengthened even further in 1899, as the Russian government started an aggressive, coordinated campaign for the Russification of Finland. Many Finns chose to escape the repression by migrating to the New World, and, during the 1900s, there were 150,000 new migrants.

Most Finns who left for America came from regions of Ostrobothnia. Other prominent points of departure were Northern Savonia and the Torne Valley. Many of the emigrants left by ship from the port town of Hanko. Judging from municipalities of origin and later linguistic statistics, it is estimated that about 20-22% of all Finnish emigrants from 1893 to 1929 were Finland Swedes of which two thirds came from the Swedish-speaking coastal parts of Ostrobothnia, and also many from the Åland Islands which had a high share of emigrants relative to population. This would mean an over-representation of Swedish speakers emigrating from Finland at the time.

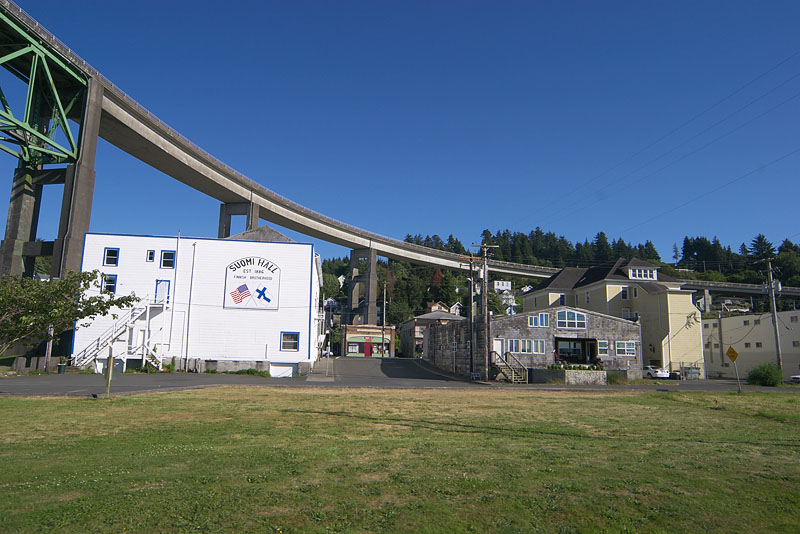
Suomi Hall, a meeting hall of Finnish immigrants, in Astoria, Oregon.

In the years surrounding the turn of the 20th century, settlement was focused around three specific regions:

- Several pockets of Finnish settlement appeared in New England. New York City and Boston, Massachusetts were the prime destinations for scores of skilled and general laborers. Cities such as Fitchburg, Massachusetts, Worcester, Massachusetts, and Monessen, Pennsylvania attracted thousands of Finns to settle in both urban and rural settings. From about 1910–30, Gloucester, Massachusetts had a thriving community of some 3,000 Finnish granite quarry workers.
- In the Upper Midwest, a similar pattern rapidly took shape. Due to the region's similar geographic and climatic features to Finland, the heaviest levels of Finnish settlement were seen in an area known as the Finn Hook, which includes northeastern Minnesota, northern Wisconsin, and the Upper Peninsula of Michigan, where Finns were heavily invested in mining and agriculture. At the same time, because of the connections between these sectors and Great Lakes shipping, another area of Finnish settlement formed in northeastern Ohio, with its core located in the port city of Ashtabula and the nearby towns of Conneaut, Painesville and Fairport Harbor. Today, the region is known as having the highest population of Americans of Finnish ancestry of any region in the United States; in the northwestern half of the Upper Peninsula of Michigan they make up the majority of the population.
- In addition, a number of rural and urban locations in the Northwestern United States contained a number of Finnish-settled areas. Cities such as Aberdeen, Washington and Astoria, Oregon were known for being prime destinations for Finnish immigrants.

The immigration of Finns gave birth to a strong Finnish-American culture, especially in the Upper Peninsula of Michigan and cities such as Duluth and Ashtabula, Ohio. Many villages were named after places in Finland (such as Toivola, Minnesota, Savo, South Dakota, and Oulu, Wisconsin).

The Finnish exodus took place after most of the available farmland in the United States was already taken and Canada's was largely still available. While many immigrants pursued farming, others found employment in mining, construction, and the forest industry, while women usually worked as maids. In the case of the Finnish-American enclave in the Finger Lakes region south of Ithaca, New York early in the 20th century, Finns left urban jobs in order to acquire farms that had been sold by their previous owners.

The migration continued well into the 20th century, until U.S. authorities set up a quota of 529 Finnish immigrants per year in 1929. Initially, this led to an increase in Finnish immigration to Canada. But as social and economic conditions in Finland improved significantly during this era, overall immigration decreased by the middle of the century.

The American revolutionary James P. Cannon noted that a considerable part of these immigrants tended towards the radical left in politics: "Under the impact of the Russian Revolution the foreign-born socialist movement grew by leaps and bounds. The foreign-born were organized in language federations, practically autonomous bodies affiliated with the Socialist Party. [Among others] there were about 12 thousand Finns, organized in their own federation".

=== Return and “Karelian fever" ===
Most Finnish migrants had planned to stay only for a few years in North America, and then return to their native land once they had become rich. However, only about twenty percent of the migrants returned to Finland. Those who did, managed to import new ideas and technologies into Finland and put them into use there.

Catching "Karelian fever", approximately ten thousand Finns travelled to the Karelian ASSR in the Soviet Union, to "build socialism” in the 1920s-30s. This took place mainly for ideological reasons and was strongly supported by the political elite of the USSR. During this period, many Finnish Americans began working in Petrozavodsk, Karelia, Duluth, Minnesota’s future sister city, to contribute to the lumber industry.

== Demographic concentrations ==
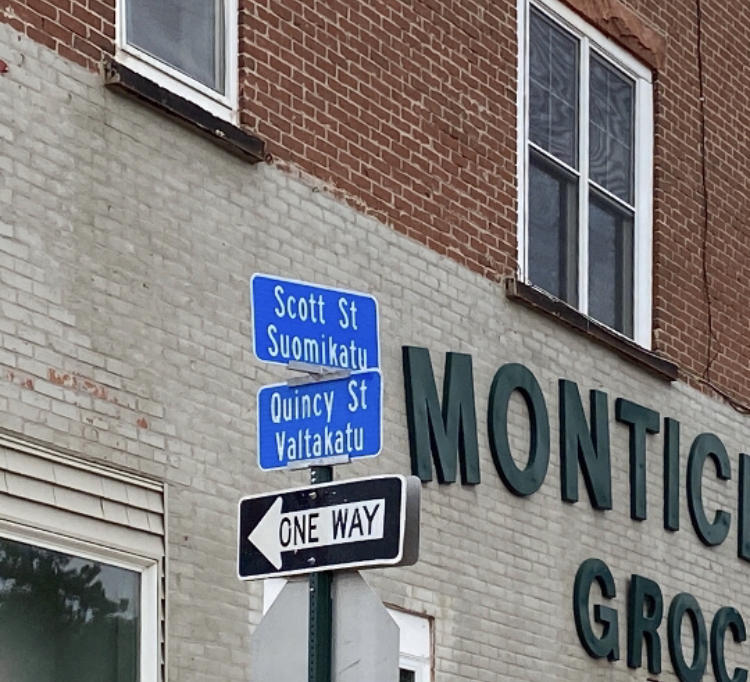
Bilingual street signs in English and Finnish in Hancock, Michigan, former home of Finlandia University.

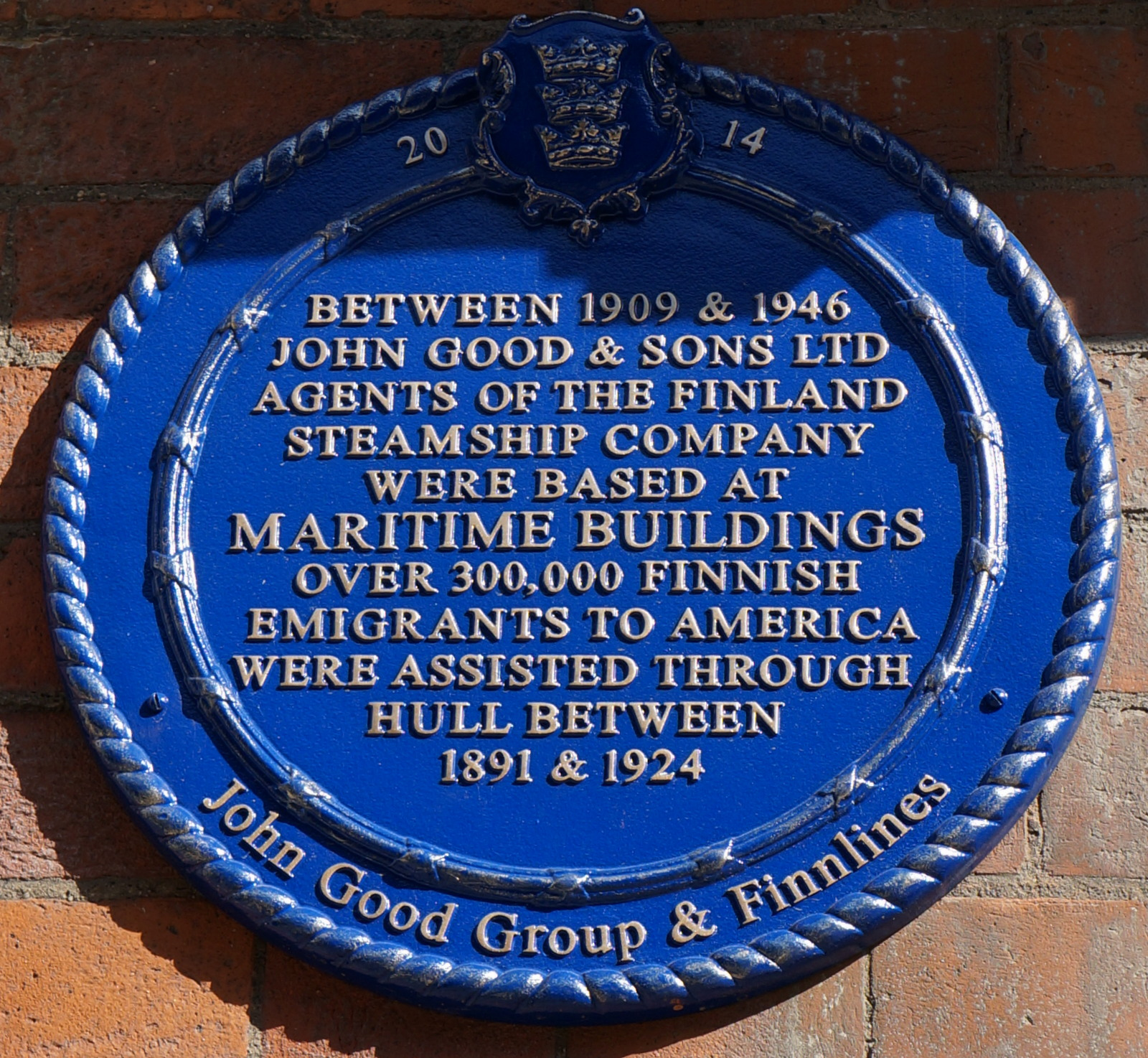
Finnish Emigrants maritime memorial

Today, the greatest concentration of Finnish Americans is in Michigan's Upper Peninsula, where they form 16% of the population, and are the largest ancestral group in the peninsula's western counties. Hancock, one city of Michigan's Upper Peninsula, could be considered a kind of "cultural capital" of the Finnish Americans. Finland Calling, a weekly Finnish cultural television program hosted by Carl Pellonpaa, was broadcast on WLUC-TV in Michigan's Upper Peninsula. In March 2015 the program's final episode aired, ending 53 years of weekly broadcasts. Stanton Township, Michigan, is the place in the U.S. with the largest proportion of people with Finnish ancestry, at 47%. The median Finnish-American household income is $70,045.

State	Finnish-American population	Percent Finnish American
United States	653,222	0.20%
Minnesota	100,545	1.78%
Michigan	94,259	0.94%
Washington	53,599	0.70%
California	48,518	0.12%
Wisconsin	39,698	0.68%
Florida	29,337	0.14%
Oregon	23,510	0.56%
Massachusetts	22,556	0.33%
Texas	20,578	0.07%
New York	18,131	0.09%
Ohio	15,978	0.14%
Illinois	14,146	0.11%
Arizona	13,869	0.19%
Colorado	13,807	0.24%
North Carolina	10,224	0.10%
Pennsylvania	8,124	0.06%
New Hampshire	7,152	0.53%
Virginia	7,142	0.08%
Maine	7,045	0.52%
South Carolina	6,944	0.13%
Montana	6,872	0.64%
Georgia (U.S. state)	6,100	0.06%
New Jersey	6,093	0.07%
Utah	5,668	0.18%
Maryland	5,612	0.09%
Indiana	5,599	0.08%
Connecticut	5,487	0.15%
Tennessee	4,870	0.07%
Nevada	4,758	0.15%
Idaho	4,459	0.25%
Missouri	3,585	0.06%
Iowa	2,572	0.08%
Alabama	2,555	0.05%
Oklahoma	2,204	0.06%
Kansas	2,198	0.08%
New Mexico	1,856	0.09%
Arkansas	1,839	0.06%
Louisiana	1,574	0.03%
Nebraska	1,533	0.08%
Hawaii	1,458	0.10%
Kentucky	1,357	0.03%
Rhode Island	961	0.09%
West Virginia	713	0.04%
District of Columbia	494	0.07%
Delaware	490	0.05%

Finnish Americans by metropolitan statistical area in 2019:

1. Minneapolis-St. Paul-Bloomington, MN-WI MSA 49,006 (1.33%)
2. Duluth, MN-WI MSA 29,881 (10.33%)
3. Detroit–Warren–Dearborn, MI MSA 29,120 (0.67%)
4. Seattle-Tacoma-Bellevue, WA MSA 22,092 (0.55%)
5. Portland-Vancouver-Hillsboro, OR-WA MSA 20,881 (0.83%)
6. New York-Newark-Jersey City, NY-NJ-PA MSA 14,841 (0.08%)
7. Chicago-Naperville-Elgin, IL-IN-WI MSA 14,394 (0.15%)
8. Boston-Cambridge-Newton, MA-NH MSA 14,228 (0.29%)
9. Los Angeles-Long Beach-Anaheim, CA MSA 11,325 (0.09%)

== Notable people ==
=== Eero Saarinen ===
Architect and product designer Eero Saarinen immigrated to the United States in 1923 when he was thirteen years of age and grew up in Michigan. His father was architect Eliel Saarinen, the first president of the Cranbrook Academy of Art in Bloomfield Hills, Michigan. He studied architecture at the Cranbrook Academy of Art and later the Yale University and graduated in 1934. After touring Europe and Africa for a couple of years he returned to the States and became a citizen in 1940. During the Second World War Saarinen worked for Office of Strategic Services (OSS) which later became the Central Intelligence Agency (CIA). Saarinen is famous for his furniture and architectural designs. His designs include the Gateway Arch at the Gateway Arch National Park in St. Louis, Missouri, the General Motors Technical Center in Warren, Michigan, the TWA Flight Center at John F. Kennedy International Airport, and the main terminal of Dulles International Airport near Washington, D.C. Eero's son, Eric Saarinen, is a cinematographer and film director, who has photographed and cinematographed several features, including The Hills Have Eyes, Lost in America, and Exploratorium.

=== Other notable individuals ===
Notable Americans of some Finnish descent also include several film stars such as actresses Anna Easteden, Christine Lahti, Marian Nixon, Maila Nurmi, Pamela Anderson, Leslie Mann and Jessica Lange, actors Albert Salmi, Matt Damon, Richard Davalos and George Gaynes, and director David Lynch. Other notable individuals are author Jean M. Auel, historian Max Dimont (born in Finland of Russian Jewish parentage), cook and cookbook author Beatrice Ojakangas, politician Emil Hurja, labor activist T-Bone Slim, U.S. Communist Party leader Gus Hall (originally Arvo Kustaa Halberg), Finnish-Kiowa-Comanche U.S. Attorney Arvo Mikkanen, mathematician Lars Ahlfors, musicians Dave Mustaine, Jaco Pastorius, Einar Aaron Swan, Jorma Kaukonen and Mark Hoppus, science fiction author Hannu Rajaniemi, computer scientists Linus Torvalds and Alfred Aho, former Google executive and CEO of Yahoo Marissa Mayer, co-founder of Apple Mike Markkula, chairman and CEO of General Motors Mary Barra, astronaut Timothy L. Kopra, special forces officer Larry Thorne, ice hockey player Matt Niskanen and serial killer Aileen Wuornos. Pornographic actress Puma Swede is of Finnish descent although she was born in Sweden.

== Culture ==
FinnFest USA is an annual festival held to celebrate Finnish heritage and culture in the United States. Organized by a non-profit organization of the same name, FinnFest USA has been held in a different location each year since 1983, often incorporating regional cultural elements of the local site into the year's event. To date there have also been three FinnGrandFests, a collaboration between Finnish-Americans and Finnish-Canadians: 2000 (Toronto, Ontario), 2005 (Marquette, Michigan) and 2010 (Sault Ste. Marie, Ontario).

Finnish American culture was also celebrated at Finlandia University in Hancock, Michigan before its closure, which has been the only Finnish American institution of higher learning in the United States since the closing of Work People's College in Duluth, Minnesota in 1941. Finlandia was established by the Finnish Evangelical Lutheran Church of America and is now affiliated with the Evangelical Lutheran Church in America. Finlandia Foundation National, based in Pasadena, CA is working with the Finnish American Heritage Center to preserve their archives and continue the Finnish American Reporter newspaper.

Salolampi Finnish Language Village is a Finnish language immersion camp in Bemidji, Minnesota. Founded in 1978, it is a member of the Concordia Language Villages, and celebrates Finnish and Finnish-American heritage, culture, and language.

Karelian pasty is a popular food among Finnish Americans.

== Politics ==
Finnish-Americans historically favored Democratic Party candidates, owing to their frequent employment in mining and other blue-collar industries. This has changed in recent decades as many of the rural regions in which they are numerous have swung to the Republican Party. In 2010, the three congressional districts with the highest concentrations of Finnish Americans (Michigan 1st, Wisconsin 7th, and Minnesota 8th), all adjacent to Lake Superior, flipped from Democratic to Republican control.

== See also ==
- Finland–United States relations
- Anti-Finnish sentiment
- Danish Americans
- Finglish
- Heikki Lunta
- Mesaba Co-op Park
- New Finland, Saskatchewan
- North American Finns in Soviet Karelia
- Norwegian Americans
- Sauna
- Sisu
- St. Urho's Day
- Seattle Commune in the Soviet Union
- Swedish Americans
- Swedish colonization of the Americas

General:

- European Americans
- Finnish diaspora
- Hyphenated American
