= Mojakka =

Fish soup originating in the region of Kalajoki, Finland

Mojakka is a fish soup originating in the region of Kalajoki, Finland.

In its original form in Finland, mojakka contains whitefish or baltic herring, butter, salt, whitewash (a flour and water mixture for thickening), and onions. No potatoes or other vegetables are added, but Finnish immigrants to the U.S. and Canada created recipes for beef or venison stews that they called mojakkas. As a result, the fish version came to be called kalamojakka.

Mojakka was originally made by fishermen working in the Gulf of Bothnia. They cooked it over fires at fishing camps during their midday breaks between pulling and setting nets at sea. As a matter of pride, the fishermen ate only the fish they themselves caught.

The word mojakka in Finnish means "cold wind" or "to feel cold" (from mojo or mojakka "cold wind; noise", mojottaa "feel cold") as explained by Eino Koponen in the Etymology of Baltic-Finnish Meteorological Terms by Lauri Hakulinen.
