= Revolt of the Ingrian Finns =

Rebellion of Ingrian Finns in Russia

- Part of Heimosodat
- Historical region of Ingria (yellow) in Saint Petersburg and its surrounding region
Date	January 1919 – 5 December 1920
Location	Ingria
Result	Bolshevik victory: Uprising suppressed; Treaty of Tartu (Finnish); Treaty of Tartu (Estonian)

Belligerents
Republic of Kirjasalo; Estonia; Supported by: Finland; White Movement	Russian SFSR

Commanders and leaders
Georg Elfengren; Elja Rihtniemi; Alexander Rodzyanko	

Strength
1,700+ North Ingrians; 2,200+ West Ingrians	Unknown

The Revolt of the Ingrian Finns (Finnish: Inkeriläisten kansannousu, also known as Inkerin vapaustaistelu) was an uprising of Ingrian Finns in Ingria during the Russian Civil War and Heimosodat. The uprising began as small pockets of resistance in 1918, with organized resistance efforts beginning in January 1919 with the establishment of both the Temporary Caretaker Committee of Northern and Western Ingria, and lasting until the collapse of the Kirjasalo Republic on 5 December 1920.

== Prelude ==
After the Great Northern War ended in 1721, Russia acquired the large region of Ingria. There were a large number of Ingrian Finns in the region, and by 1917 there were more than 140,000. However, tensions were high under the Bolshevik rule. Following the October Revolution in St Petersburg, the Grand Duchy of Finland immediately began preparing to declare its independence. On December 6, 1917, the Senate adopted the Declaration of Independence by a vote of 100 to 88. This, combined with the Estonian War of Independence, inspired many Ingrians to thoughts of rebellion.

== Rebellion ==
=== Republic of North Ingria ===
In January 1919, the Temporary Caretaker Committee of Ingria was established by Ingrian refugees who fled to Finland following expulsion of Ingrian Finns from their homes in Lempaala. The Temporary Caretaker Committee of Ingria established the North Ingria Regiment in July 1919. The North Ingria Regiment was led by Georg Elfvengren and trained by Jaeger Colonel Eero Kuussaari. The Regiment was originally sized 580 men strong. The Republic of Kirjasalo was established following the declaration of independence from Bolshevik Russia on 9 July 1919.

The regiment led by Elfvengren began its offensive from the Finnish border on 28 July 1919, having previously served as Border Guardsmen prior to the offensive. The unit captured Kirjasalo, later capturing Perämäki and Putkelovo on 30 July, killing twenty-five Bolshevik troops in the process. The unit was also assisted by independent partisans, who captured Miikkulainen, a settlement in the far north-east of Ingria, however the partisans were later defeated by the Bolsheviks.

Elfvengren was sacked by the Finns due to having performed the offensive without permission on 2 August 1919, he was replaced by a Finnish Elja Rihtniemi. Rihtiniemi served as the leader of the unit for two months, having only really built fortifications during his tenure and later resigning, Elfvengren was re-hired. Elfvengren was approached by Nikolai Yudenich of the White Army, who gave the regiment much needed weaponry, ammunition and money however on the condition to join Yudenich on a planned attack towards St. Petersburg.

The North Ingria Regiment began its second offensive on 21/22 October 1919, this time towards Toksova, which was the most important location in Northern Ingria. The regiment would encounter a detachment of Red Finns and a group of armed workers led by Anarchist I.P. Zhuk at Gruzino railway station. Elfvengren's regiment won the battle, however was forced to retreat to Kirjasalo, due to the complete lack of artillery and trains, which the Bolsheviks had.

==== Collapse ====
Finland had not offered significant support to the Kirjasalo Republic, not wanting to sabotage its peace negotiations with the Bolshevik Russia. When it signed the Treaty of Tartu with the Bolsheviks, Kirjasalo was handed over and affirmed to be Russian.

On 5 December 1920, Erik Heinrichs held a speech in Kirjasalo, the anthem of the Kirjasalo Republic, 'Nouse, Inkeri' and Porilaisten Marssi were sung. The flag of the Kirjasalo Republic was saluted and lowered on 6 December 1920. The North Ingria Regiment crossed the border into Finland to be disarmed, and Elfvengren soon resigned from his station in the Finnish military to fight with the White Russians in Crimea.

Kirjasalo was practically abandoned, after which the Red Army moved into the four villages controlled by the Republic and retook them.

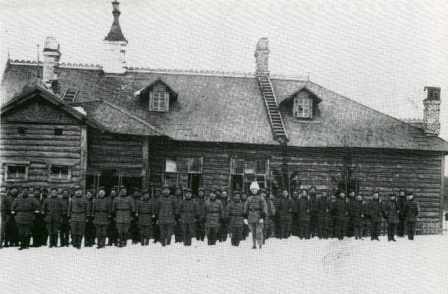
Georg Elfengren with the North Ingrian Regiment in Kirjasalo, shortly after capturing the village

=== Ingria Battalion & Estonia ===
In March 1919, the Temporary Caretaker Committee of Ingria and Estonia made an agreement to establish a volunteer unit based in Estonia made up of Ingrian Finns. The Ingria Battalion was formed as a part of the Estonian Land Forces and was purposed to fight in Western Ingria. The unit began its first activity in May 1919, crossing the Luga River, the unit captured coastal villages and eventually reaching Soikkolanniemi. On 19 May 1919, the unit experienced its first defeat in battle at Koporje.

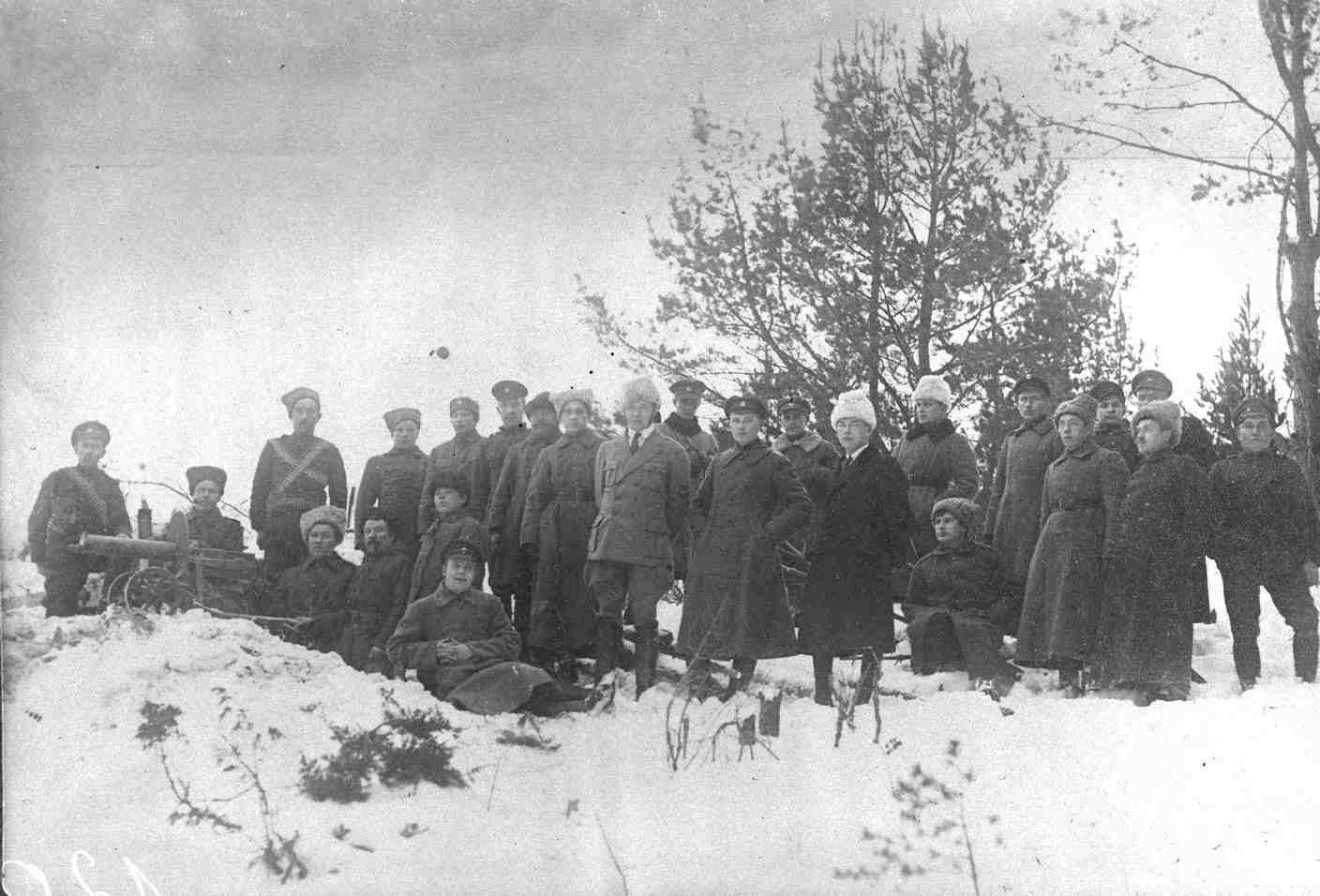
Men of the Ingria Battalion in 1919 in Western Ingria.

Before the defeat at Koporje the unit held the strength of around 241 men, the unit expanded into a regiment in June, reaching around 2,200 men in size. The regiment began to recapture coastal villages, capturing the Yhinmäki Fort, however it was unable to the defend to fort from the Red Army. Following the defeat at Yhinmäki, internal conflict within the regiment grew. The Ingrians and Finns wished for the independence of Ingria or the autonomy within Finland, while the White Russians in the regiment would not tolerate the separation of Ingria from Russia. The result of the internal conflicts within the regiment was the disbandment of the regiment in June 1919.

Following the reassembly of the unit in Estonia, the unit took part in military engagements in Western Ingria between July and August, travelling towards Soikkola village. In October, the unit took part in the attempted capture of St. Petersburg, spearheaded by the White Army. Following the failure at St. Petersburg, the unit guarded the border at Narva-Jõesuu, later being disbanded in June 1920.

== Aftermath ==
It is thought that a small number of the North Ingrians involved with the rebellion never reached Finland, and decades later appeals were put out in newspapers asking after them.

Later up to 18,800 Ingrian Finns would be directly murdered in the Genocide of the Ingrian Finns, and 60,000 to 105,000 Ingrians would be victims of deportation and imprisonment from the 1920s to the 1970s. In 1926, the population of Ingrian Finns was estimated to be at 115,000. From 1929–1931, 18,000 Ingrian Finns were deported, in 1935 about 7,000 Ingrian Finns were deported, and in 1935–1936, a total of 26,000–27,000 Ingrian Finns were deported. Most deported Ingrians ended up in GULAG forced labour camps, and by 1938, 60,000 Ingrian Finns, roughly half the Ingrian Finnish population had been deported.

== See also ==
- Bibliography of the Russian Revolution and Civil War
- Outline of the Russian Revolution and Civil War
- Index of articles related to the Russian Revolution and Civil War
- The "Russian" Civil Wars, 1916–1926: Ten Years That Shook the World
- Russia in Flames: War, Revolution, Civil War, 1914–1921
- Russia in Revolution: An Empire in Crisis, 1890 to 1928
- Russia: Revolution and Civil War, 1917—1921
- The Russian Revolution: A New History
