= Peniki =

Peniki Пеники Penniki (Russian: Пѣнники) (before 1920s), Penikkala (Finnish)
- Village
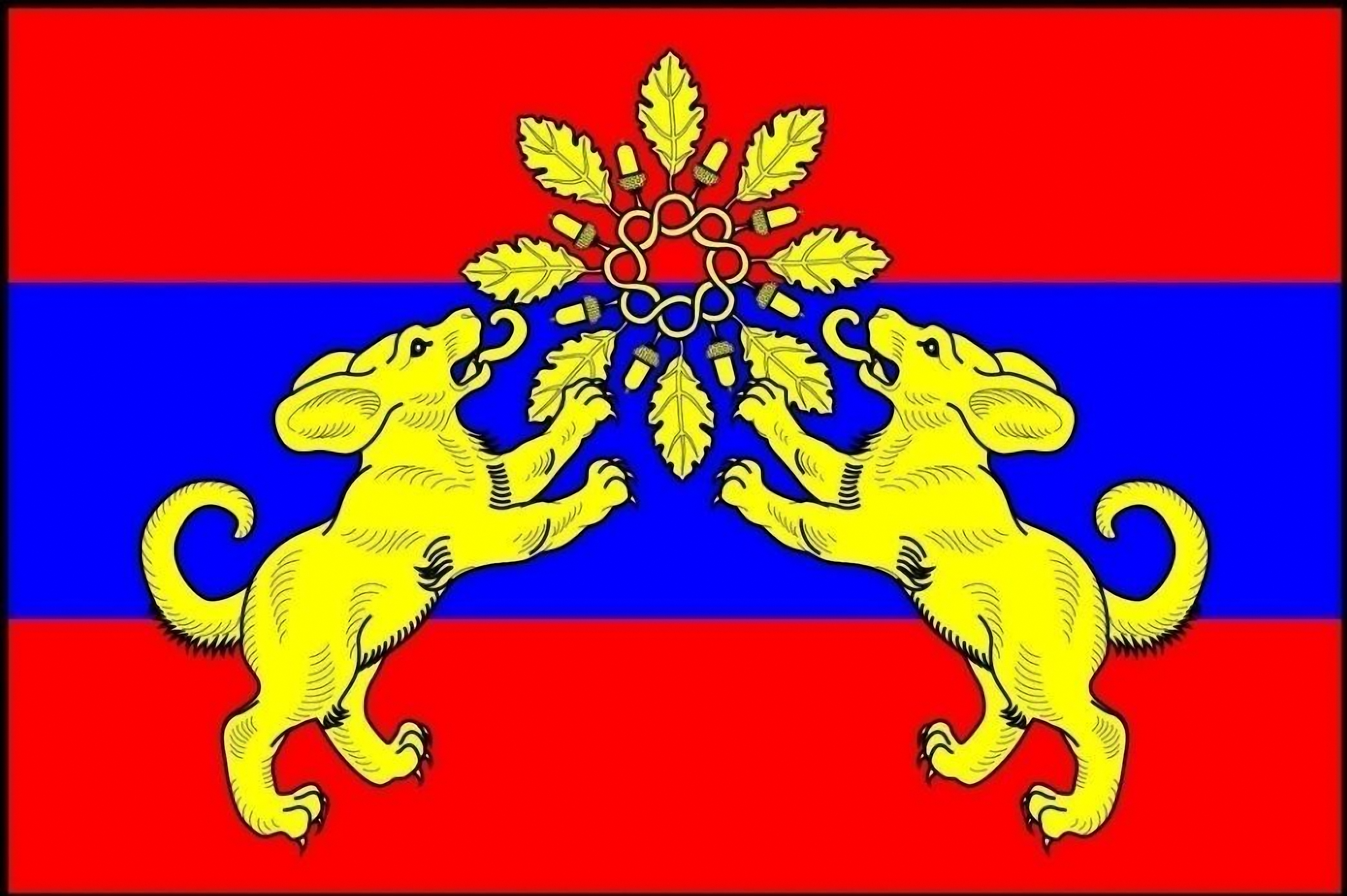
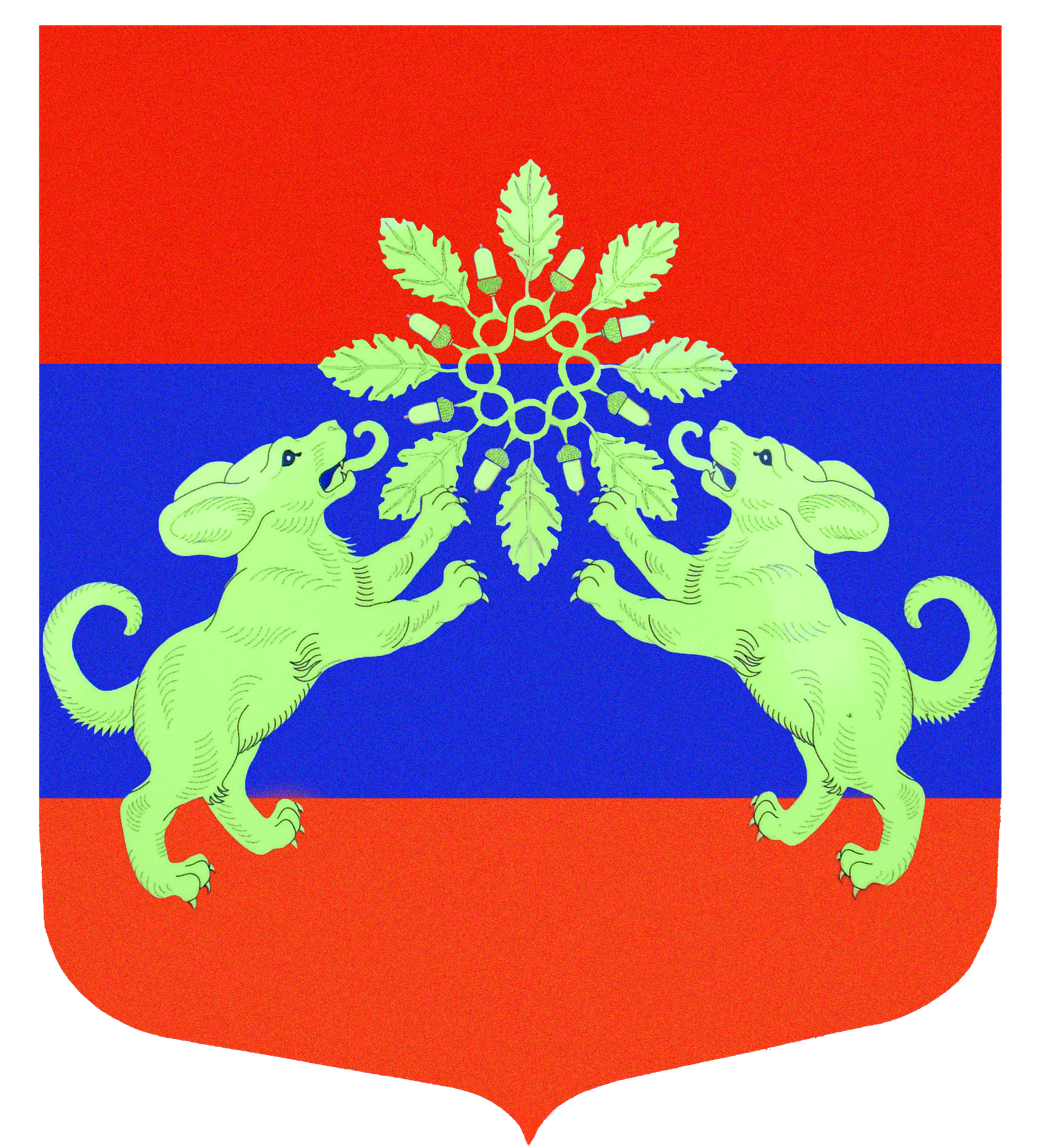
- Flag Coat of arms
- Etymology: From Finnish penikka – "a puppy"
- Interactive map of Peniki
- Coordinates: 59°55′03″N 29°38′31″E
- Country: Russian Federation
- Oblast: Leningrad Oblast
- District (raion): Lomonosovsky District
- Rural Settlement: Penikovskoye Rural Settlement or Peniki Rural Settlement
- Established: 1817

Population (2010)
  - Total: 1,207
- Time zone: UTC+03:00
- Zip Code: 18853
- Website: peniki47.ru

Peniki (Russian: Пе́ники, romanized: Péniki, IPA: [ˈpʲenʲɪkʲɪ], Finnish: Penikkala) is a rural locality (a village) in Lomonosovsky District of Leningrad Oblast, Russia. Municipally, it is a part and the administrative center of Penikovskoye Rural Settlement.

== Name of the village ==
The village was founded between 1763 and 1782. During the Emancipation Reform of 1861 in the Russian Empire, the local Orthodox priest Vasily wrote a description of the poverty and profiteering of the local population, which has been preserved. The priest frequently reported on the peasants, allowing the landlords to know all about their faults.

At this time, a manor was built here, where the owner bred hounds and sold puppies. It is from this enterprise that the village's name derives: Peniki (Penniki, Penikkala), from the Finnish word penikka, meaning "puppy".

== Climate ==
The climate of the village of Peniki is characterised as a cool temperate climate with moderately warm summers and moderately cold winters. Under the Köppen climate classification, Peniki is classified as Dfb, a humid continental climate. Winters are warmer here than in Moscow due to the village's proximity to the Gulf of Finland. The Gulf of Finland is located just 1 km from the centre of the village. The average maximum temperature in July is 22 °C (71.6 °F), while the average minimum temperature in February is −10.5 °C (13.1 °F). Average annual precipitation is 669 millimetres (26.338 in).

Climate data for Peniki
Month	Jan	Feb	Mar	Apr	May	Jun	Jul	Aug	Sep	Oct	Nov	Dec	Year
Daily mean °F	23.0	24.1	32.7	46.0	59.5	68.5	71.6	68.2	57.6	45.9	34.3	27.7	46.7
Mean daily minimum °F	13.1	13.1	20.3	31.6	41.7	51.4	55.2	52.9	44.8	36.3	27.5	18.7	33.8
Average precipitation inches	1.57	1.22	1.41	1.45	1.61	2.48	2.99	3.26	2.95	2.67	2.51	2.16	26.338
Daily mean °C	−5.0	−4.4	0.4	7.8	15.3	20.3	22.0	20.1	14.2	7.7	1.3	−2.4	8.2
Mean daily minimum °C	−10.5	−10.5	−6.5	−0.2	5.4	10.8	12.9	11.6	7.1	2.4	−2.5	−7.4	1.0
Average precipitation mm	40	31	36	37	41	63	76	83	75	68	64	55	669.0
Source: Climate-Data.org

Climate graph:

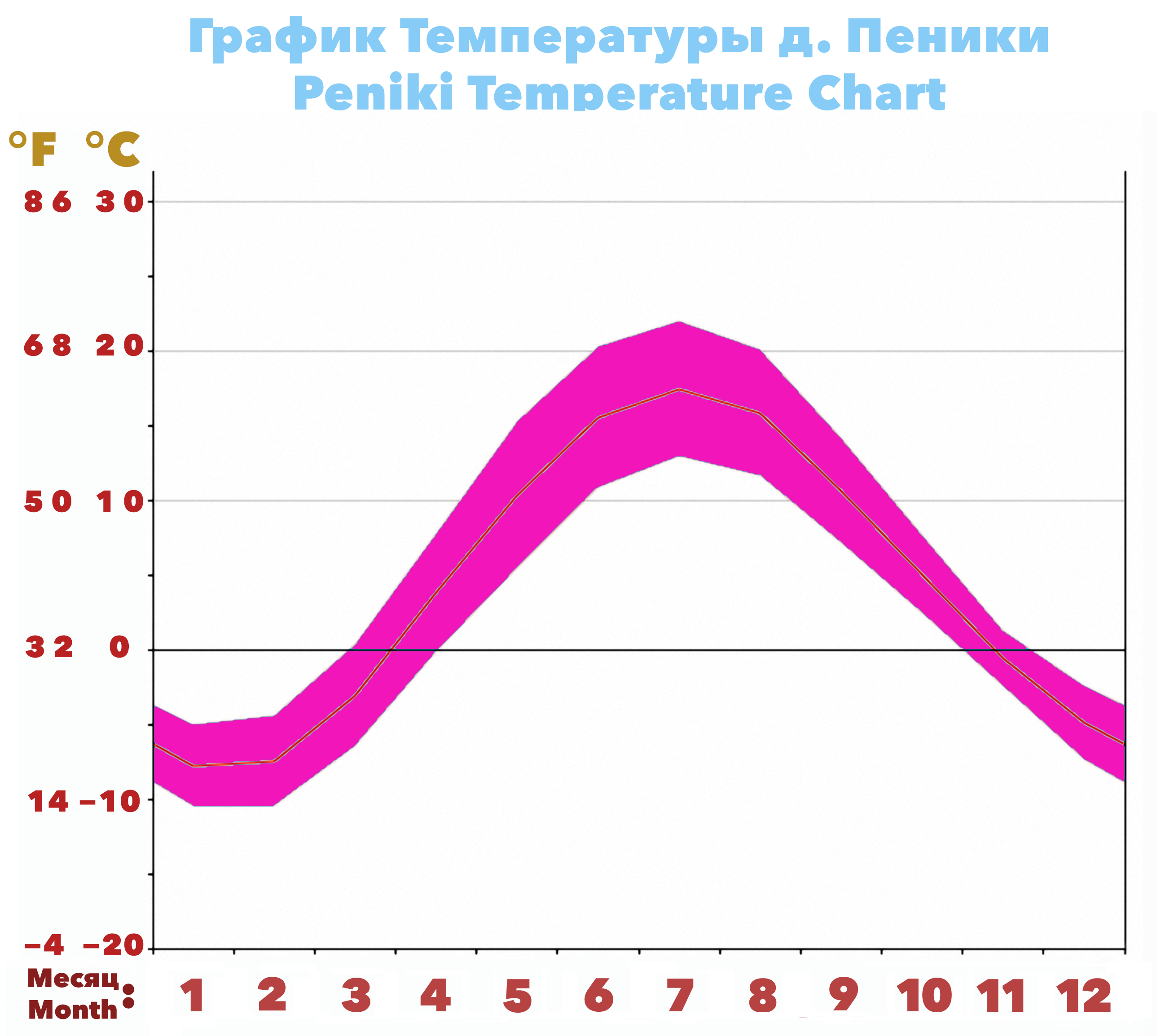

== History ==
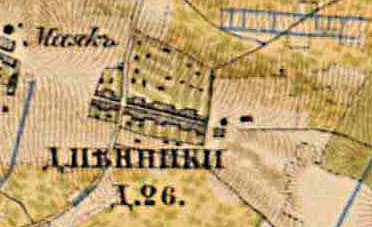
The village of Peniki on the map of 1885.

The territory of what is now Lomonosovsky District of Leningrad Oblast, including the territory of modern Peniki, was formerly part of Sweden. It belonged to the historical region of Ingria from 1617 to 1721, until the territory was returned to the Russian Empire.

The village is marked on the Semi-topographical Map of 1810.

On the "Topographic Map of the Neighborhoods of Saint Petersburg" produced by the Military Topographic Depot of the General Staff in 1817, the village of Peniki is mentioned. The map records 16 households in Peniki.

The village of Peniki, with 16 households, is also mentioned on Friedrich von Schubert's "Topographical Map of the Environs of St Petersburg of 1831":

Peniki is a village belonging to Grand Duke Mikhail Pavlovich, with a population according to the revision of 44 males and 48 females (1838).

According to the explanatory text accompanying P. I. Köppen's Ethnographic Map of the Saint Petersburg Governorate of 1849, the village is recorded as Penikkala (Penniki, Peniki). Its population in 1848 was given as follows: Ingrians–Äyrämöisets: 11 males and 15 females; Ingrians–Savonians: 16 males and 17 females; Izhorians: 32 males and 33 females; total population: 124.

In 1860, Peniki had 25 households.

On the map of 1863, the village is marked as Penniki, whereas the name Peniki was used on a map drawn in 1925.

By 1913, the number of households had increased to 35.

According to the topographic map of 1939, the village had 70 households.

After 1942, the overwhelming majority of the village's population were Russians by ethnicity. The indigenous population, consisting of Izhorians and Ingrians, was deported and subjected to repression under Stalin. Today, however, the remaining population is largely assimilated into Russian society.

== Geography ==
The village is located in the northern part of the district, near the southern shore of the Gulf of Finland, west of the city of Lomonosov and east of the village of Bolshaya Izhora. It is 9 km from the raion centre and 2 km from the nearest railway station of Bronka.

== Communications infrastructure ==
The Peniki village has two Internet service providers (ISP) providing high-speed Internet. These are Viartcom and Freedom House. Telecommunication is also available and the telephone dialing code of the village is +7 813-7654 (+7 – Russian country calling code, 813 – Leningrad Oblast code).

== Transportation ==
Bus services are available, including routes No. 691 and 691A. In addition, fixed-route taxi K-502 operates along the route Lomonosov → Malaya Izhora → Peniki → Dubki → Bolshaya Izhora and in the opposite direction: Bolshaya Izhora → Dubki → Peniki → Malaya Izhora → Lomonosov. A section of the Saint Petersburg Ring Road (the western half-ring) also passes through the territory of the Penikovskoye Rural Settlement.
