= Ingria (disambiguation) =

Ingria is a historical region in what is now northwestern European Russia.

Ingria may also refer to:

- Ingria, Piedmont, comune in the Metropolitan City of Turin in the Italian region Piedmont
- North Ingria, a short-lived, small state for the Ingrian Finns, which seceded from Bolshevist Russia after the October Revolution
- Swedish Ingria, a dominion of the Swedish Empire

== See also ==
- Ingrian (disambiguation)
- Izhora (disambiguation)
