= Postage stamps and postal history of North Ingria =

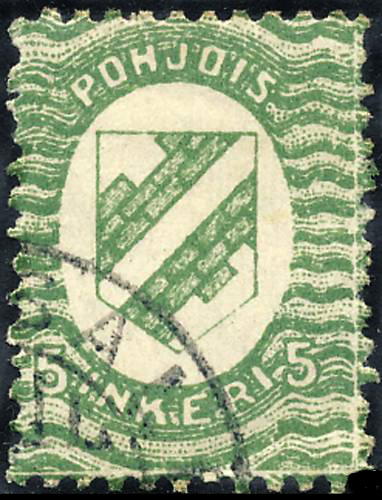
5 pennies of the Series I

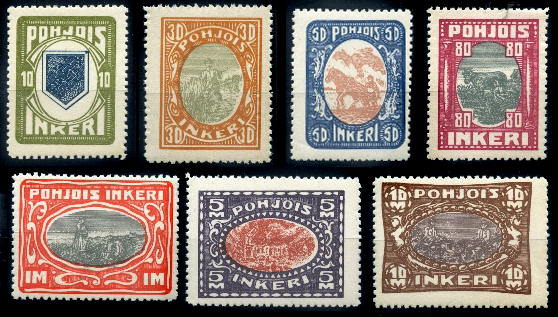
Series II of the North Ingrian stamps

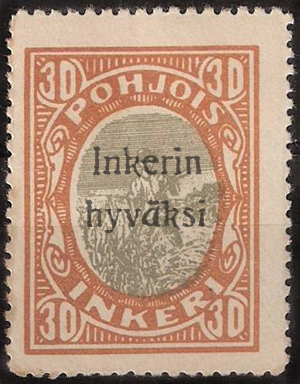
A North Ingrian stamp overprinted "Inkerin hyväksi" (For the Ingria) in 1921

The Republic of North Ingria (Finnish: Pohjois-Inkerin tasavalta) was a short-lived state of Ingrian Finns in 1919–1920, which seceded from Soviet Russia after the October Revolution. Its postal system was operated by the local government in co-operation with the Ministry of Transport and Public Works of Finland and the Finnish postal service.

== History ==
North Ingria was located in the Karelian Isthmus, between Finland and Soviet Russia. It was established 23 January 1919. The republic was first served by a post office at the Rautu railway station on the Finnish side of the border. As the access across the border was mainly restricted, the North Ingrian postal service was finally launched in the early 1920. The man behind the idea was the lieutenant colonel Georg Elfvengren, head of the governing council of North Ingria. He was also known as an enthusiastic stamp collector. The post office was opened at the capital village of Kirjasalo.

The first series of North Ingrian stamps were issued on 21 March 1920. They were based on the 1917 Finnish "Model Saarinen" series, a stamp designed by the Finnish architect Eliel Saarinen. The first series were soon sold to collectors, as the postage stamps became the major financial source of the North Ingrian government. The second series was designed for the North Ingrian postal service and issued 2 August 1920. The value of both series was in Finnish marks and similar to the postal fees of Finland. The number of letters sent from North Ingria was about 50 per day, with most of them being carried to Finland. They were mainly sent by the personnel of the Finnish occupying forces. Large number of letters were also sent in pure philatelic purposes.

With the Treaty of Tartu, the area was re-integrated into Soviet Russia and the use of the North Ingrian postage stamps ended on 4 December 1920. Stamps were still sold in Finland in 1921 with an overprinting "Inkerin hyväksi" (For the Ingria), but they were no longer valid. Funds of the sale went for the North Ingrian refugees.

== Values ==
Series I

- 5, 10, 25 and 50 pennies
- 1, 5 and 10 marks

Series II

- 10, 30, 50 and 80 pennies
- 1, 5 and 10 marks
