= Ingrian =

Ingrian may refer to:

- Of or pertaining to the region of Ingria
- The Ingrians, which may refer to:
  - Ingrian Finns, descendants of Finnish immigrants to Ingria in the 17th century
  - Izhorians, an indigenous people of Ingria
- The Ingrian language (also called Izhorian; spoken by the Izhorians)
- The Ingrian dialects (spoken by Ingrian Finns)
