= Savakot =

Former subgroup of Ingrian Finns

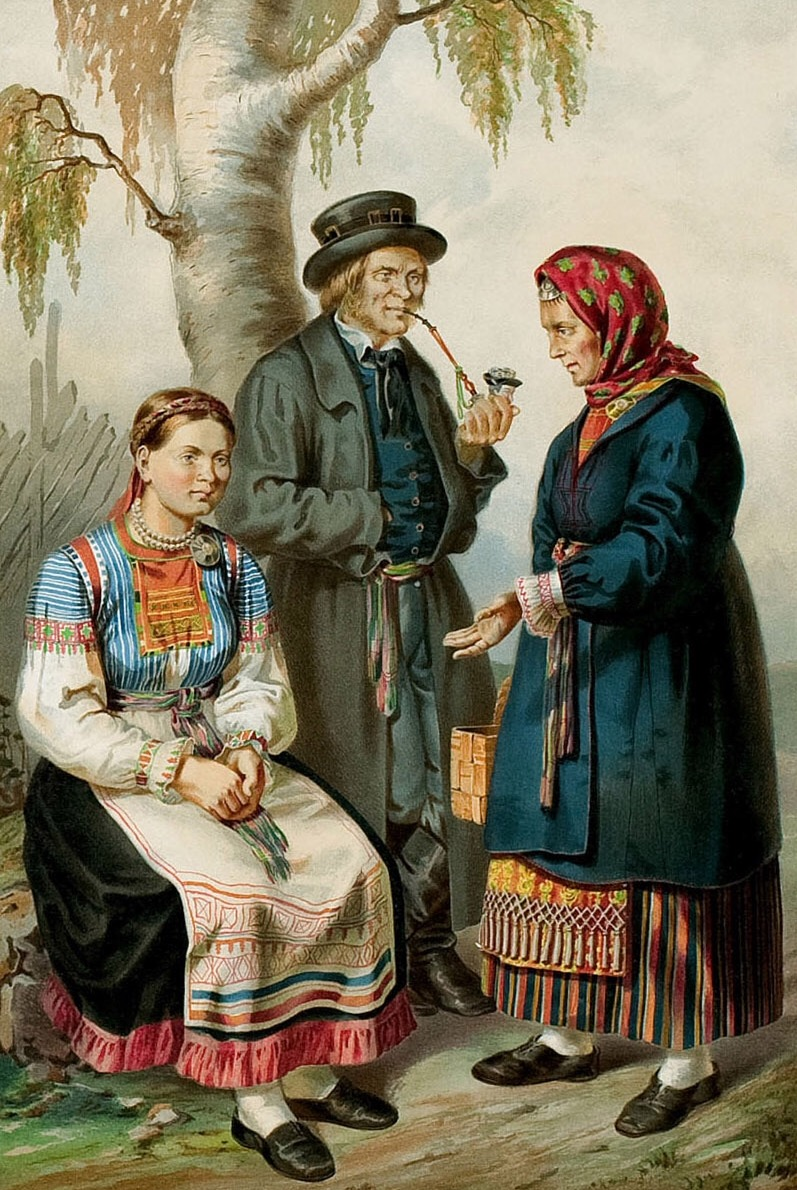
Äyrämöiset & Savakot Finns, depicted in 1862, Ingria region.

Savakot (plural; singular: Savakko; Russian: Савакоты) were one of the two main subgroups of Ingrian Finns, the other being the Äyrämöiset. The Savakot descended from Finnish (Savonian) peasants who had migrated to Swedish Ingria (now part of Russia) from Savonia in Eastern Finland during the 17th century.

According to German-born Russian ethnographer Peter von Köppen (known in Russia as Petr Keppen), in the middle of the 19th century there were 43,000 Savakot on the Karelian Isthmus. In 1929, in Leningrad Oblast, there were about 115,000 "Leningrad Finns", which included both Savakot and Äyrämöiset and excluded "Finland Finns" (whose number was estimated at 13,000). At that time (1929), their urban population was insignificant. At the same time, their literacy level was among the highest (72%), which was given as a reason for the higher level of their agriculture. Agriculture was their major occupation, with shoreside population engaged in fishing, and small part engaged in logging. Later the self-identification of the Savakot disappeared.
