= Lempaala =

Lempaala may refer to:

- Lempäälä, a municipality in Finland
- Lempaala, Finnish name of Lembolovo, a rural locality in Russia
