= Savonian people =

Subgroup of the Finnish people

Savonians
- Coat of arms of the historical province of Savonia

Regions with significant populations
- North and South Savo

Languages
- Finnish (Savonian dialects)

Religion
- Lutheranism

Related ethnic groups
- Russian Karelians, other Finns, especially Tavastians, Kainuu Finns, Finnish Karelians, Forest Finns, Ingrian Finns

Savonians (Finnish: savolaiset; Savonian: savolaaset, savolaeset), or Savo Finns, are a subgroup (heimo) of Finns who live in the areas of the historical province of Savonia.

== History ==
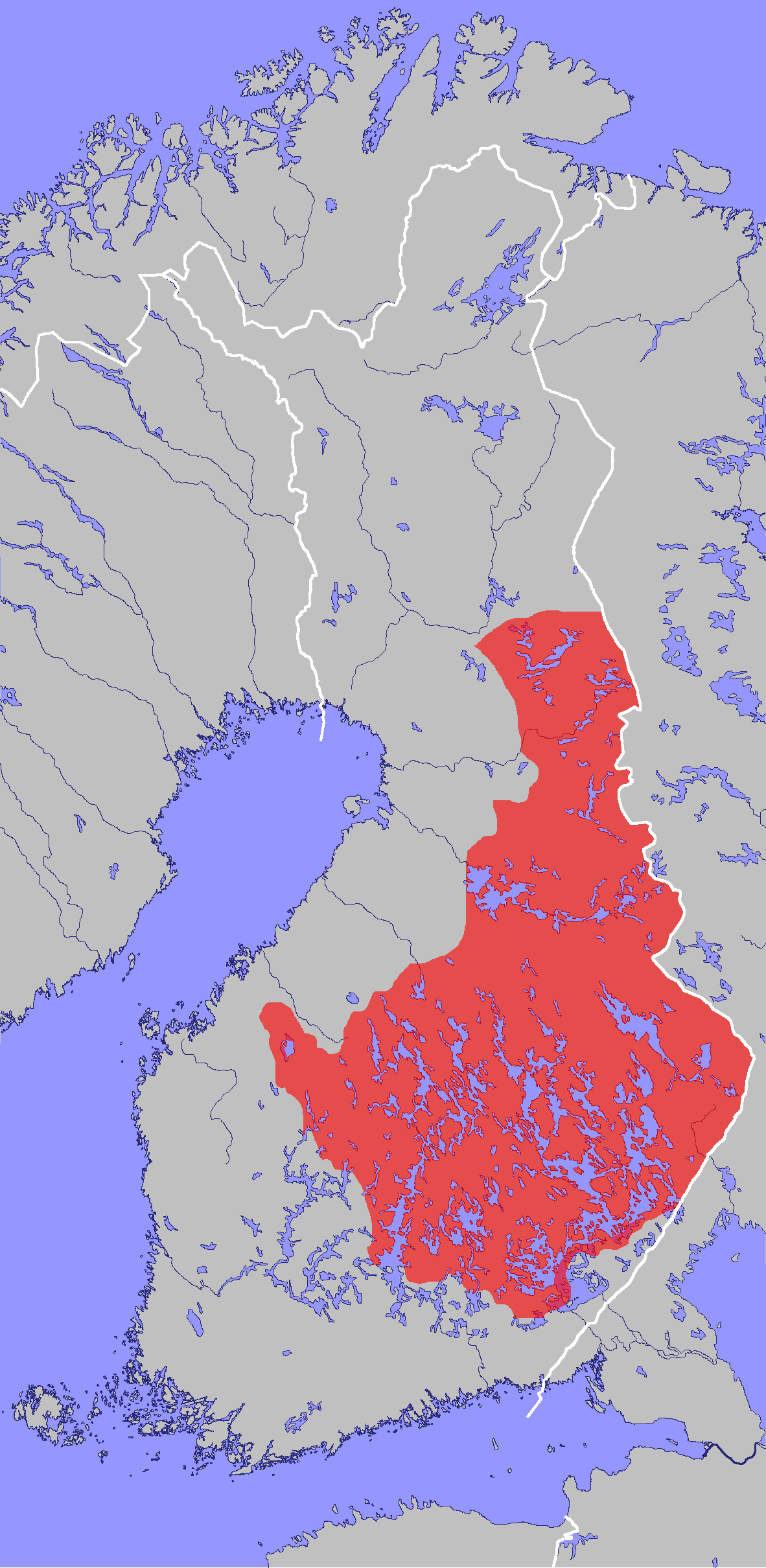
The areas where the Savonian dialects are spoken

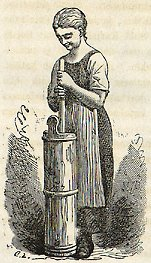
A maid from Savonia churning butter. From Boken om vårt land by Zachris Topelius

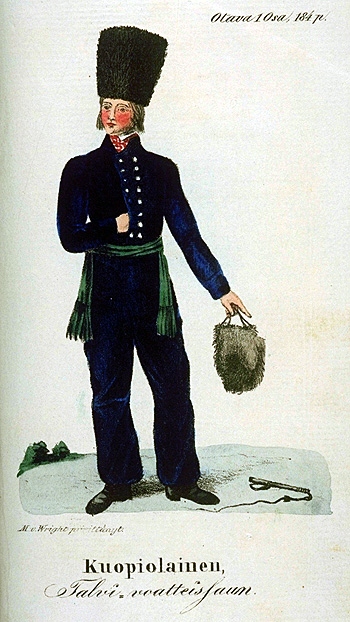
Man from Kuopio in his winter clothes (1831)

Savonians are descendants of Tavastian and Karelian peasants who, during the Middle Ages, had settled in the areas that would later become known as Savonia in order to find new lands suitable for slash-and-burn agriculture. The Treaty of Nöteborg split the area between Sweden and Novgorod Republic, Savonia going to Sweden and Karelia to Novgorod. This tied Savonia to the Finnish language and Lutheran religion. While Savonia as a region was first mentioned in writing in 1323 in the treaty, Savonians as a separate group emerged around the year 1700 as a result of the mixing of Karelians and Tavastians.

Savo already had fast settlements in 500 CE. Genetically, it was thought that Savo was populated mainly by South Karelians but DNA research has shown that under sixth of the population originates from Karelia and most are from Tavastia or belong to an older Sámi population in the region.

During 16th and 17th centuries, many Savonians emigrated to Eastern Norway and Central Sweden where they became known as the Forest Finns. In the 17th century, there was also a migration to Swedish Ingria (now part of Russia), where they became known as Savakot and collectively known as the Ingrian Finns together with the Äyrämöiset (Finnish Karelians).

== Description and stereotypes ==
The stereotypical Savonian is talkative, easy-going, jolly and humorous, occasionally even to an offensive degree. Traditionally, the Savonians have often been considered to be "sneaky" and "mendacious." However, recent research has shown that this infamy is largely due to misunderstandings caused by the traditional Savonian social indirectness.

Savonians and Karelians were the first people in Finland to use surnames, beginning during the Middle Ages. These surnames are known for containing the "nen" diminutive.

== Notable Savonians ==
- Juhani Aho
- Hannu Aravirta
- Juhan af Grann
- Harri Hakkarainen
- Pekka Halonen
- Teemu Hartikainen
- Jukka Hentunen
- Marko Hietala
- Kari Hietalahti
- Pekka Janhunen
- Olli Jokinen
- Jussi Jääskeläinen
- Kasperi Kapanen
- Sami Kapanen
- Klaus Karppinen
- Urho Kekkonen
- Kalle Kerman
- Topi Keskinen
- Harri Kirvesniemi
- Hannes Kolehmainen
- Mikko Kolehmainen
- Sakari Kuosmanen
- Kaapo Kähkönen
- Esapekka Lappi
- Kari Laukkanen
- Juice Leskinen
- Otto Leskinen
- Erkki Liikanen
- Eetu Luostarinen
- Paavo Lötjönen
- Otto Manninen
- Jarmo Myllys
- Ari-Pekka Nikkola
- Urho Nissilä
- Spede Pasanen
- Petteri Pennanen
- Joonas Rask
- Tuukka Rask
- Timo Rautiainen
- Olli Rehn
- Rasmus Rissanen
- Antti Ruuskanen
- Eliel Saarinen
- Arja Saijonmaa
- Matias Siltanen
- Heikki Silvennoinen
- Kari Tapio
- Ilpo Tiihonen
- Jussi Timonen
- Kimmo Timonen
- Erkki Toivanen
- Marko Tuomainen
- Allu Tuppurainen
- Kari Ukkonen
- Jenni Vartiainen
- Iiro Viinanen
- Jukka Voutilainen
