= Izhora (disambiguation) =

The Izhora is a river in northwestern Russia.

Izhora may also refer to:

- Izhora Plateau, in Leningrad Oblast
- Ingria, or Izhora, a historic region
- Izhorians, indigenous people native to Ingria

== See also ==
- Izhorskiye Zavody, a Russian machine building company
