= Kirjasalo =

Kirjasalo Кирьясало
- Village
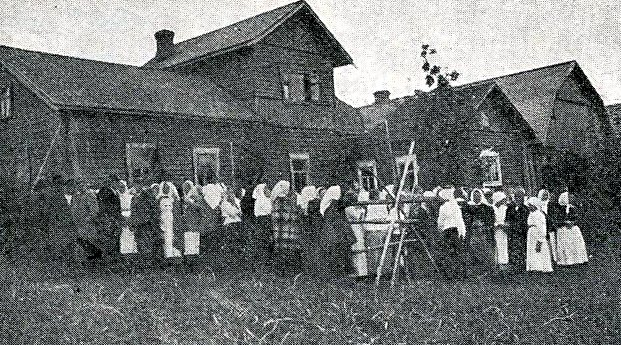
- Inhabitants of Kirjasalo, 1920

- Location within Leningrad Oblast
- Coordinates: 60°26′23″N 30°05′52″E
- Country: Russia
- Federal District: Northwestern Federal District
- Federal Subject: Leningrad Oblast
- District: Priozersky District

Population
  - Total: 0

Kirjasalo (Russian: Кирьясало) is an abandoned village in Vsevolozhsky District of Leningrad Oblast, Russia. It was located between the Volchya River and the Tunteljoki on the Karelian Isthmus. Its population was largely composed of Lutheran Ingrian Finns, and the region belonged to the Parish of Lempaala of the Evangelical Lutheran Church of Ingria.

== History ==
The village was first mentioned on a 17th-century map as Koriasilka. Kirjasalo has also been spelled as "Кирьясалы" (Kirjasaly) in older Russian maps, at least between 1885 and the 1920s.

From 1919 to 1920, Kirjasalo served as the capital city of the short-lived separatist Republic of Kirjasalo, also known as North Ingria. During the time of de facto independence, the region would gain its first hospital and proper infrastructure.

In 1926, Kirjasalo became a part of the Finnish Selsoviet (village soviet) called Kuivozovski until 1936, when the village soviet was abolished. In the mid-1930s the population was a victim of genocide or deported to other areas of the Soviet Union, mostly to Siberia.

During the Continuation War, the Finnish defensive VT-line passed through Kirjasalo.

== Demographics ==
In 1926, the population makeup of the village did not have a homogeneous population, instead being made up of three-hundred-six Ingrian Finns, fifty-three Russians and three other unspecified populations.
