= Tuutari (parish) =

Finnish Lutheran church parish in Ingria

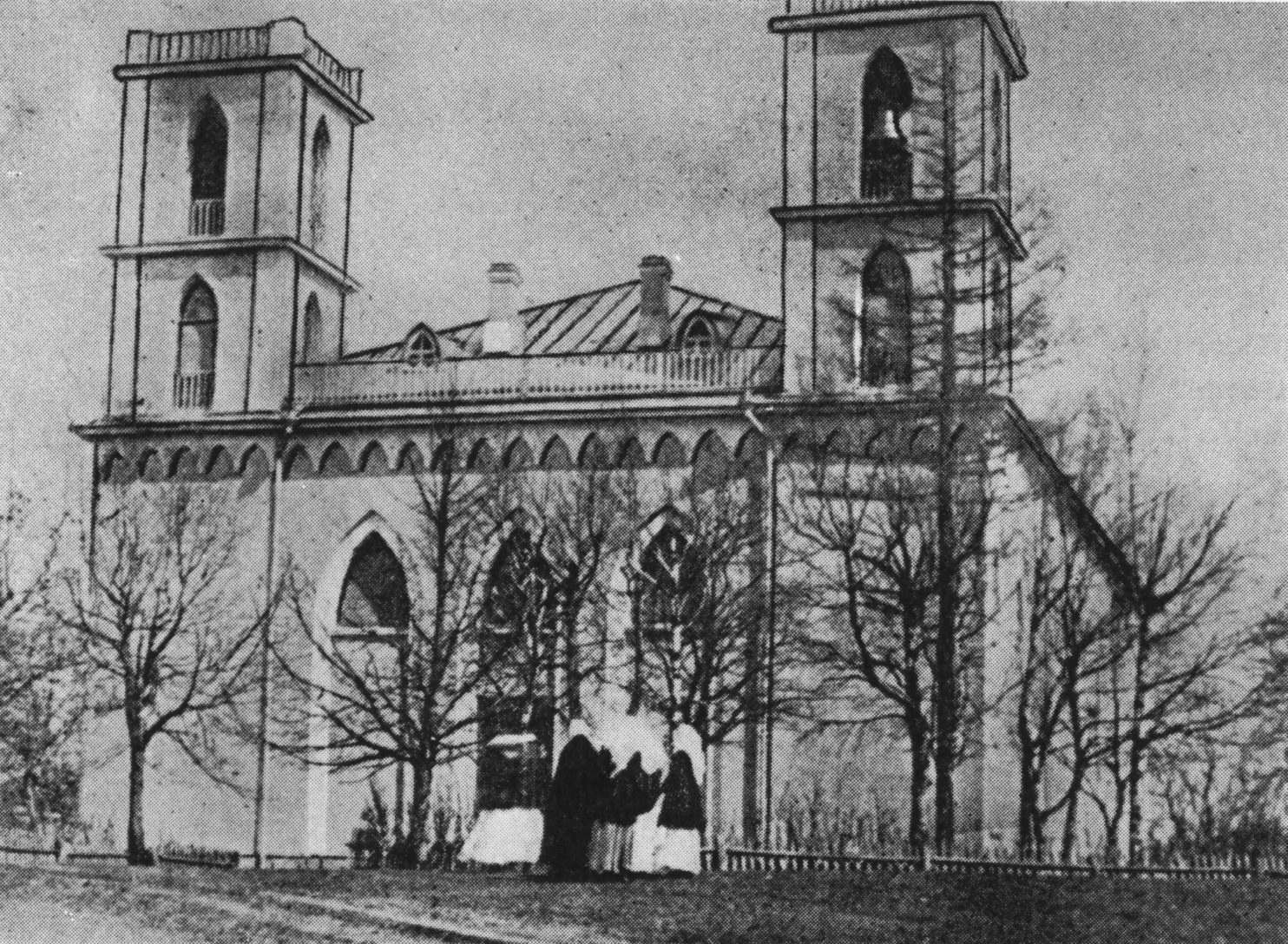
Tuutari Church of the Holy Trinity

Tuutari (Russian Дудерово, Дудорово, Дудергоф, Swedish Duderhof, Dudern) is a historical Finnish Lutheran church parish in Ingria.

== Geography ==
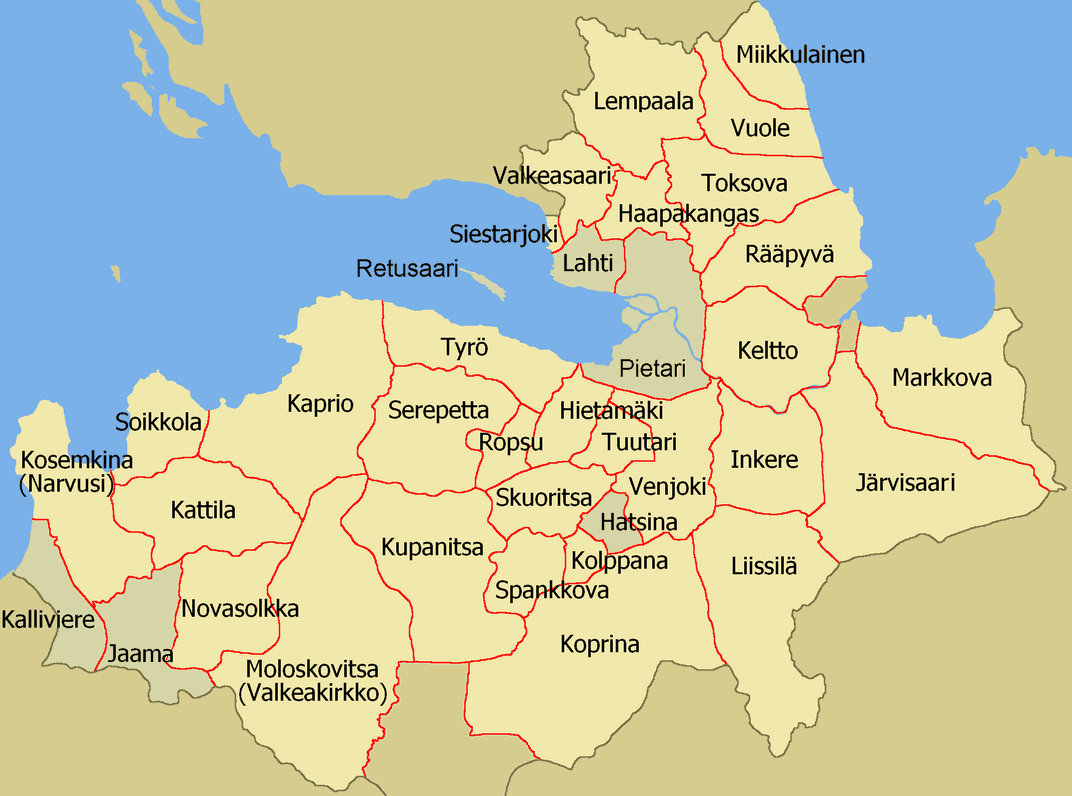
Ingria and its Lutheran parishes in the Russian Saint Petersburg Governorate, circa 1900.

Tuutari parish incorporated land areas in central Ingria around Tuutari heights, north-east and east of the Tuutari lake. Historically, it was a part of the Ingrian Governorate in the Swedish Kingdom and after the Great Northern War the Saint Petersburg Governorate in the Russian Empire. Its neighbouring parishes were Venjoki in the North and West, Skuoritsa in the South and Hietamäki in the East.

The area of the former parish is nowadays part of Saint Petersburg's southern municipalities (Krasnoye Selo and its neighborhood) and Lomonosovsky District's eastern territories.

== History ==
Tuutari is one of the oldest Finnish parishes in Ingria dating back to the beginning of the 17th century. The parish was probably named after the same-named manor (Swedish Duderhof). The first church was built during the Swedish rule in the Nowikkola (also Nowicola) village in the nowadays Krasnoye Selo, where the Russian tsarist palace was built in 1823. After the Great Northern War, the parish, together with the rest of the Ingria, was incorporated to the Russian Empire. The old church was destroyed in the war. 1736 a new wooden church was built at the place where formerly stood a small chapel at the Mölkönmäki hill. The new church depreciated fast and a new one was built in 1760. That church lasted until 1836 when a new stone church was built by the orders of Tsar Nikolai I. The church was nationalized in 1937 and closed in 1939 by the soviet rule. During the World War II the church was badly damaged and was left in ruins until the ruins were demolished in 1953.

The congregation was reestablished in the 1990s after the collapse of the Soviet Union. In the area where once was church is nowadays a ski park called Tuutari Park. A new church was built in 2006 in the village of Pikkola.

== Tuutari villages ==
The villages had sometimes many synonyms (usually derived from the familyname of the family that was living in the village). There were also different names in Finnish and Russian. The following lists the original Finnish names with alternative Finnish forms and Russian name forms in the brackets. Some villages consisted of smaller villages, which are listed separately.

Alajoki aka Peroja aka Pikko (Bolšije Pikki), Hannola (Hannolovo), Hieprola (Hebrolovo), Hirvosi (Rots), Humalisto (Humalistõ), Härkösi (Gargezi), Ihalaisi (Suzi), Järveläisi aka Pieni-Karhila (Maloje Karlino), Karhila (Bolšoje Karlino), Kaurasaari (Kagrassarõ), Kavelahti (Kavelahta), Kirveelä (Kirbuzõ), Koirova (Koirovo), Kuittila (Kuitilovo), Kurikka (Kurikka), Kurkela (Novosjolki), Kylmälä aka Parrila (Kulmja), Laakala (Lagolovo), Lottula (Lottolovo), Muikkala (Mõkkolovo), Murjala aka Kotsala (Murilovo), Mäkeläisi (Malõje Pikki), Nuijala aka Pieni-Kapasi (Maloje Kabozi), Nurkkaporu (Nurkobori), Närhilä aka Tuippola (Tuipo), Pajula (Pajula), Partasi (Pardane), Pelkola aka Repola (Pelgola), Peräkylä (Perekjulja), Pikkola (Pikkolovo), Pöllälä (Pellilja), Raja-Leinilä (Novaja), Riehkala aka Kapasi (Rehkolovo), Saarela aka Karvala (Karvala), Suolasi (Solozi), Tallikkola aka Kekkilä (Tallikovo), Tolppala (Tolpala), Uusi-Ihalaisi (Novõje Suzi), Variksela aka Vauhkola (Variksolovo), Viholaisi (Vigolaine), Viittala aka Suuri-Viittala (Bolšoje Vittolovo), Villasi (Villozi), Ylipelto aka Pieni-Viittala (Maloje Vittolovo)

Honkasi: Hämäläinen aka Ylä-Sparri (Hamaljaine), Mäntyharju aka Ilmasti aka Koivisto (Menduhhari), Metsävainikka aka Venäjänrasi (Venerjazi)

Lokovala: Kirppula (Kirpunõ), Raskela (Rasskolovo), Saksala (Saksolovo)

Nurkkala: Kyllisi (Kjulezi), Lamppula aka Rännilä (Lampula), Peikolaisi (Peigolaizi)

Revonpesät aka Palmula: Ala-Kyttälä (Alakutta), Kämärä, Lintusi (Linduzi), Naumosi (Naumuzi), Ylä-Kyttälä (Juljakutta)

Sulkula aka Mäkikylät: Jänismäki (Janismjaki), Leininmäki (Lenimjaki), Lemetinmäki (Lemedimjaki), Parkonmäki (Pargomjaki), Pulkkisenmäki (Pulkizi), Pökkösenmäki (Pekkozemjaki), Talsinmäki aka Talsila (Talzilovo),

Tököttilä: Myrälä (Mjurelja), Korpelaisi (Korbilevo), Rötsälä (Retselja), Ryytteli (Rjutteli),

== Gallery ==
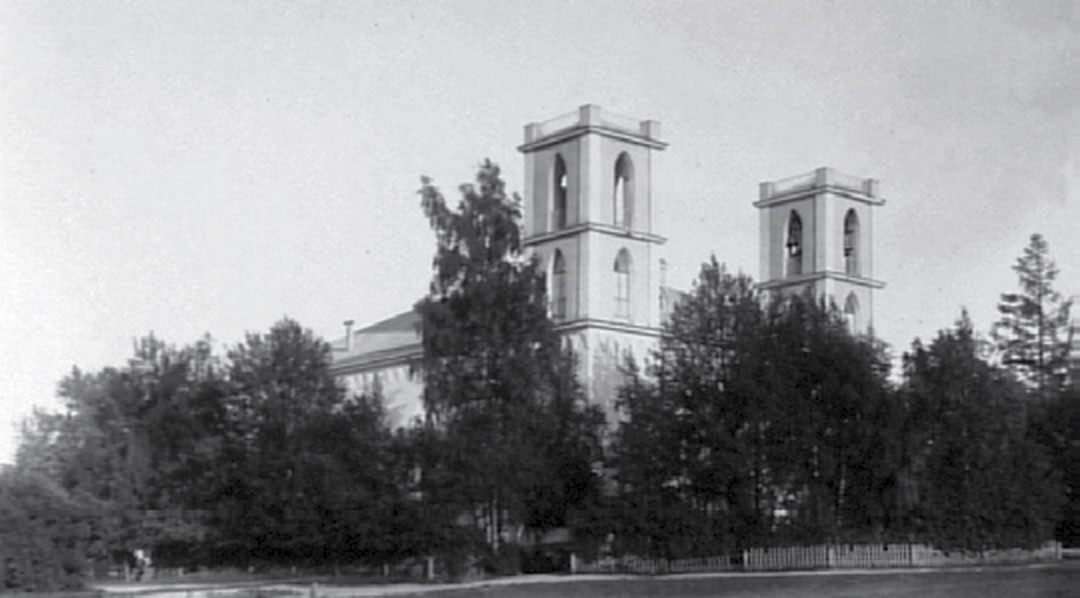
Tuutari church in 1911

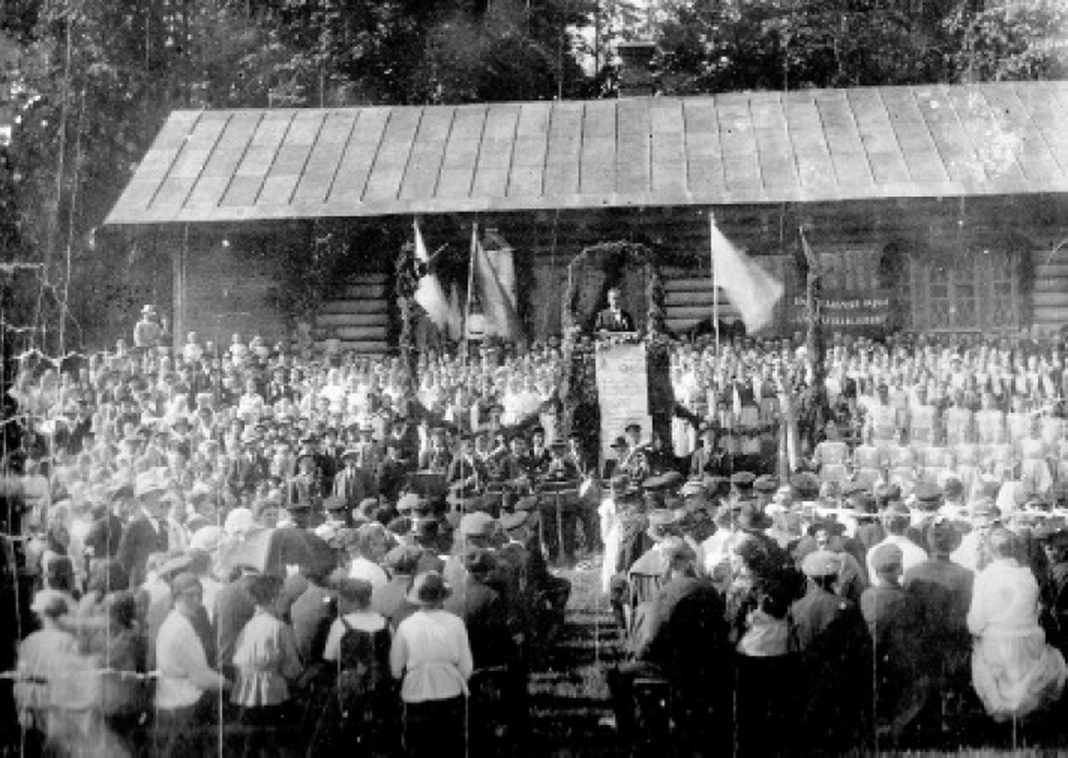
Ingrian Finnish song festival held in Tuutari in 1918

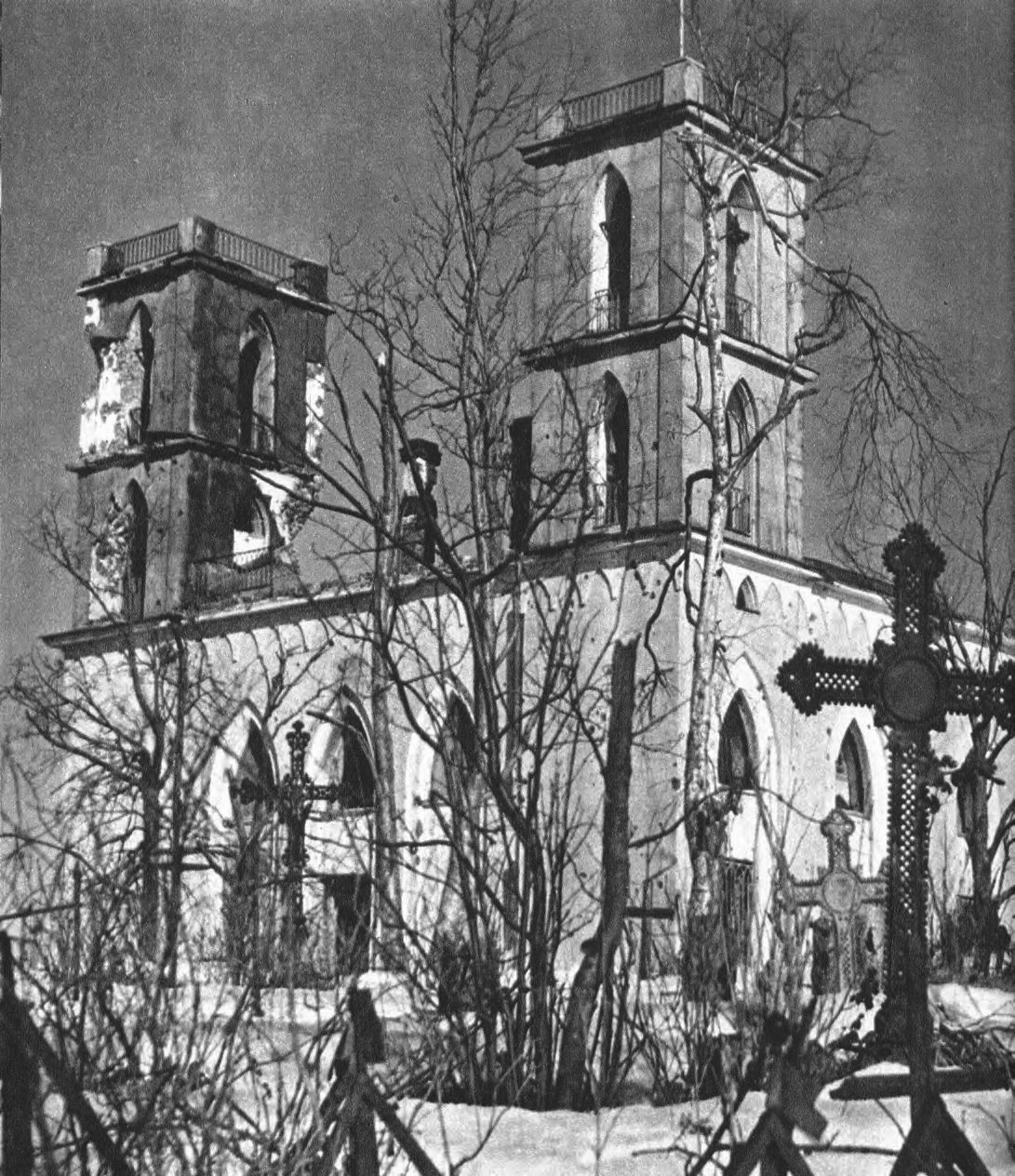
Tuutari church in 1943.

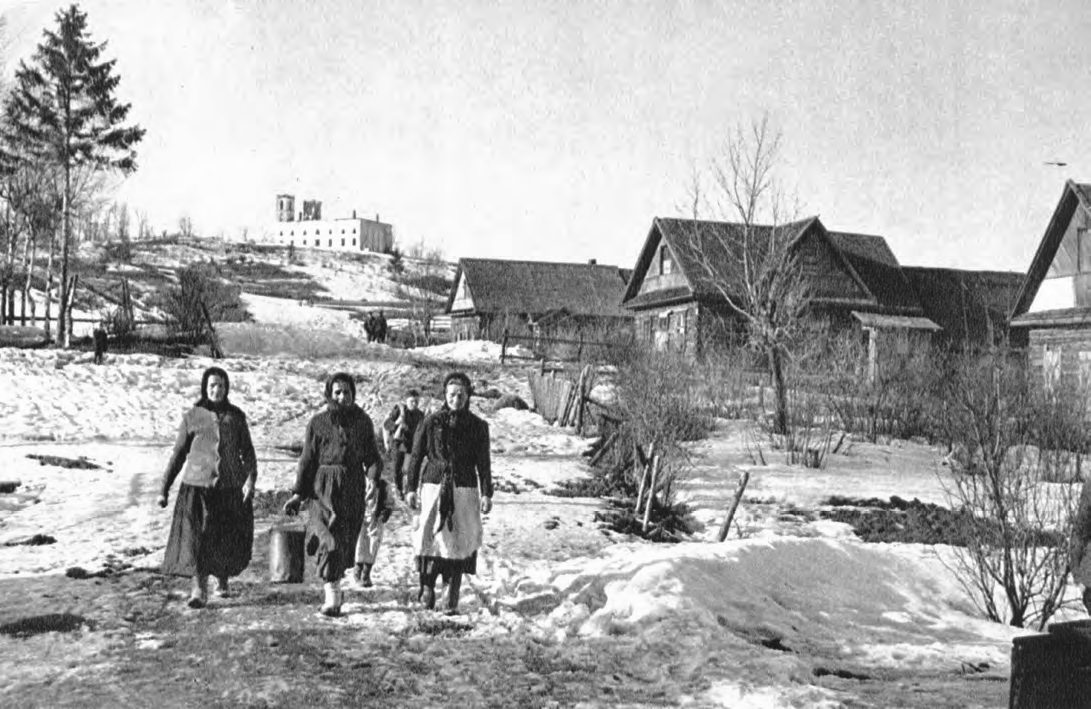
View over the church ruins in 1943. aastal.
