= North Ingria =

1919–1920 de facto state in Eastern Europe

Coordinates: 60°28′43″N 30°05′28″E

Republic of Kirjasalo Kirjasalon tasavalta (Finnish)
- 1919–1920
- Flag Coat of arms
- Anthem: Nouse, Inkeri
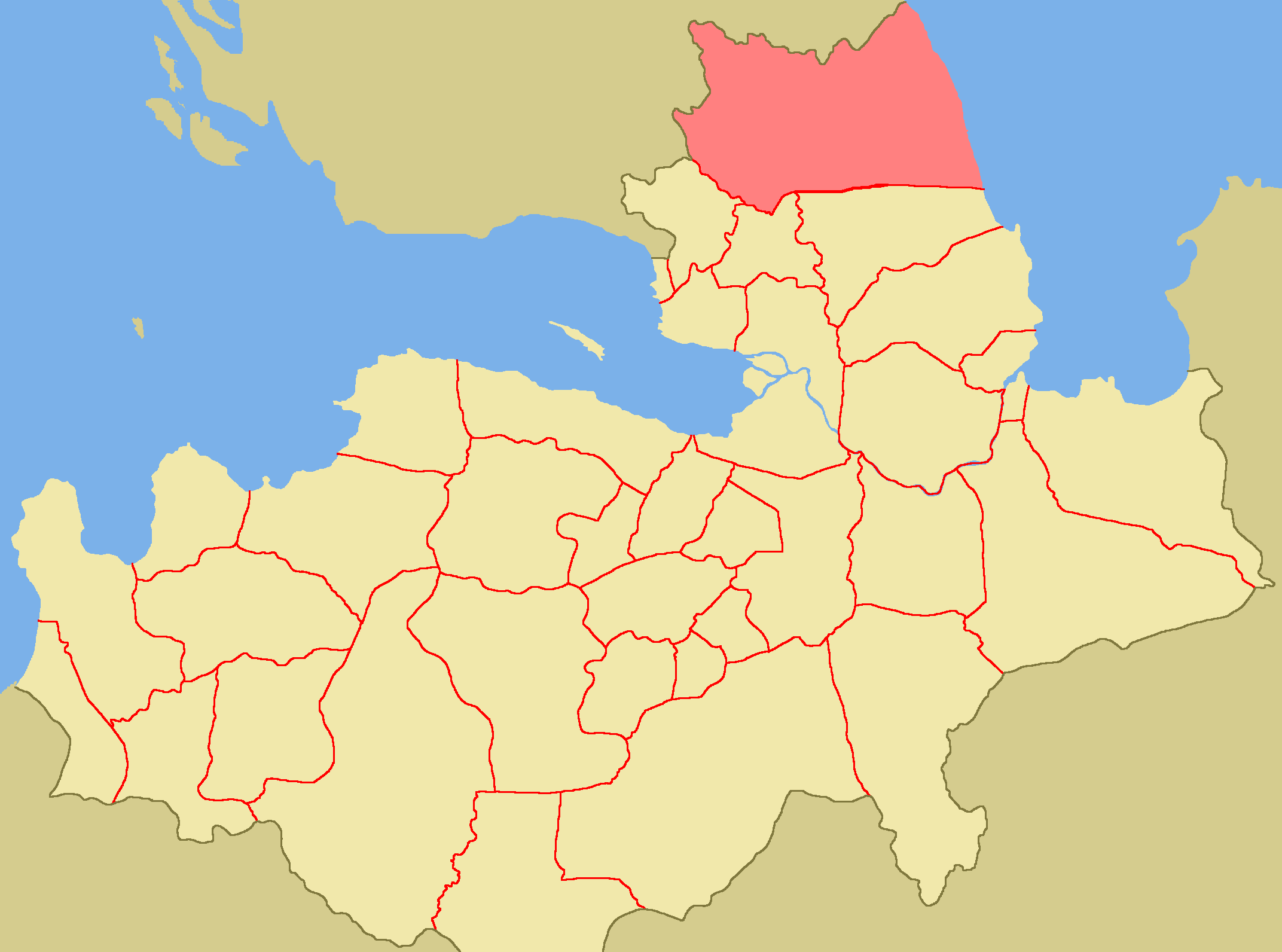
- Location of North Ingria (in red), within the historical region of Ingria (in light beige).
- Capital: Kirjasalo
- Official languages: Finnish
- Recognised regional languages: Russian
- Government: Republic
- History
  - Established: 9 July 1919
  - Disestablished: 5 December 1920

Area
  - Total: 30 km^{2} (12 sq mi)
- Currency: Finnish Mark
Preceded by	Succeeded by
RSFSR	RSFSR

The Republic of Kirjasalo (Finnish: Kirjasalon tasavalta), commonly referred to as the Republic of North Ingria (Pohjois-Inkerin tasavalta) was a short-lived unrecognized state from 9 July 1919 to 5/6 December 1920. (Note: Most Finnish-language sources state 5 December 1920 as the date when the republic was dissolved, but Russian-language sources state 6 December 1920 as the date when the republic was dissolved.) The country was located in the southern part of the Karelian Isthmus, specifically in Kirjasalo and Lempaala.

== Government and the Republic ==
Kirjasalo was in control of approx. 30 square kilometres (12 sq mi), including five villages that had a total population of around 400 people. (Note: Includes Military volunteers, Civil Guardsmen, and Finns and Ingrian Finns that moved to the controlled villages temporarily.) The country had its own Protection Corps and local newspaper Kirjasalo Sanomat as well as its own military regiment, the North Ingria Regiment, which was composed of 580–1,700 military volunteers, and led by Georg Elfvengren, prior to being sacked and replaced by Elja Rihtniemi. The official flag and coat of arms of the Republic of Kirjasalo were designed by Ilmari Haapakoski and were inaugurated on 8 September 1919. Kirjasalo also had its own badge of honor, the Cross of the Ingrian White Wall.

=== Government ===
The Republic of Kirjasalo had two governments in charge, the Pohjois-Inkerin Hoitokunta ('North Ingrian Caretaker Committee'), which was the executive refugee government established in July 1919 by Ingrian refugees from Bolshevik Russia, and the Caretaker Committee, which was in charge of boosting morale, publishing stamps to raise money, and organizing volunteer regiments, such as the North Ingria Regiment. A local council existed in Kirjasalo, though it was only ever operational for a couple of months.

Start day	Start month	Start year	End day	End month	End year	Chair
9	July	1919	?	September	1919	Santeri Termonen
14	September	1919	?	November	1919	Juho Pekka Kokko
16	November	1919	?	May	1920	Georg Elfvengren
?	June	1920	5	December	1920	Jukka Tirranen

== History ==
Following the October Revolution, and Bolshevik Russian expulsions and mass-mobilizations of Ingrian Finns in Kirjasalo and other locations, and with the Heimosodat (Aunus Expedition), tensions were high in Northern Ingria. On 9 July 1919, the Pohjois Inkeri Hoitokunta ('North Ingrian Caretaker Committee') was elected as the executive government with Santeri Termonen at its head, and the independence of Kirjasalo was declared in a meeting attended by around 400 people in Rautu.

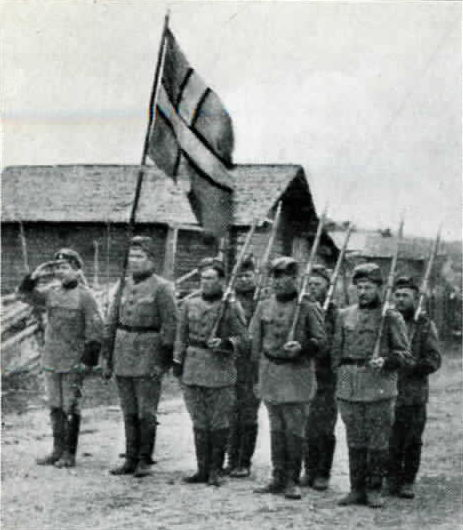
Flag-carrying group of the North Ingria Regiment in 1919.

Finland began to supply Kirjasalo with military equipment, and volunteer activists began to train the Ingrian military volunteers. Georg Elfvengren became the leader of the newly organized North Ingria Regiment, leading around 580 men. On 26 July 1919, Elfvengren launched military offensives towards Ylä-Miikkulainen and Lempaala from the Finnish border, capturing multiple villages and locations, eventually reaching Perämäki and Putkelovo on 30 July, killing twenty-five Bolshevik troops in the process. Independent separate forces loyal to Kirjasalo occupied Miikkulainen, a settlement in the far north-east of Ingria, but were later defeated by the Bolsheviks. Due to Bolshevik replenishments, Elfvengren's were forced into retreat, retreating until the village of Kirjasalo.

Elfvengren's hopes of causing a diplomatic incident and causing a wider rebellion amongst Finns and Ingrian Finns in the area had failed terribly. Having performed an attack without the prior approval of the Finnish Government, Elfvengren was sacked and replaced by Elja Rihtniemi. Elja Rihtniemi began to construct fortifications in Lempaala and requested weapons from Finland, Rihtniemi would resign two months later, and Elfvengren would be re-hired. Elfvengren began to get back on the offensive in accordance with Nikolai Yudenich of the White Army, this deal with the White Movement helped Kirjasalo receive four observing officers from the Northwestern Army, and receive much-needed financial assistance leading to the building of a hospital and other key infrastructure. Yudenich had signed a deal with Elfvengren for the purpose of getting him to join a planned attack on St. Petersburg.

A new offensive in accordance with Yudenich was started on 21/22 October, with the goal of capturing the village of Toksova, which was the most populous and important centre of North Ingria. The first battle was with Red Finns at the Gruzino railway station which was used to transport Bolshevik forces. However an armoured train and workers from the Shlisselburg powder factory, led by I.P. Zhuk arrived to the battle. The Ingrian forces were victorious but unable to continue their advancements.

Ingrian forces were unable to continue fighting the Red Army, as they were equipped with artillery and armoured trains, which the Ingrians did not have, as the Finns once again refused to supply the Ingrian forces except for the donation of topographic maps of the region. The Ingrians lost control over the Gruzino railway station, and were forced to retreat back to Kirjasalo.

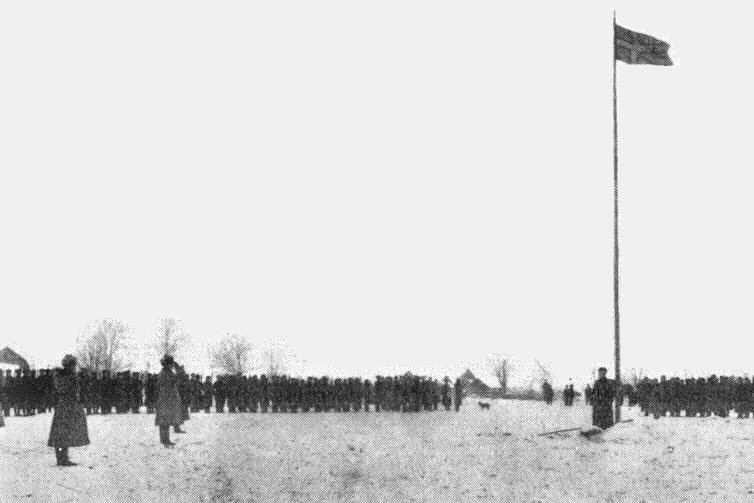
The Flag of the Republic of Kirjasalo (North Ingria) being lowered and saluted on 6 December 1920.

After the Treaty of Tartu, the entirety of Ingria was affirmed to be in the control of Bolshevik Russia, a mourning party was hosted on 5 December 1920. During the farewell party Erik Heinrichs held a speech, after which Nouse, Inkeri, the anthem of Kirjasalo, and Porilaisten Marssi were sung. The State Flag was saluted and lowered on 6 December 1920, and on the same day the village of Kirjasalo left for Finland.

== See also ==
- Postage stamps and postal history of North Ingria
- Ingrian Finns
