= Äyrämöiset =

Former subgroup of Ingrian Finns

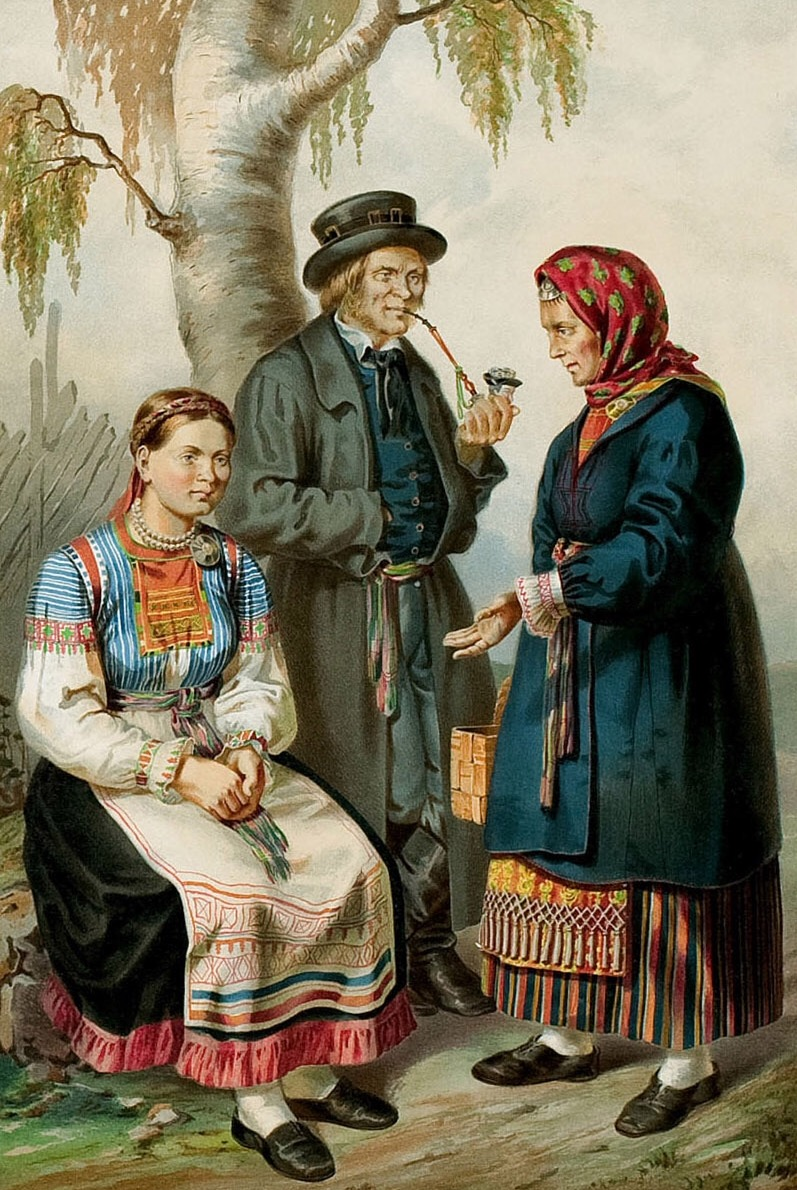
Evrimeiset and Savakot Finns, depicted in 1862, Ingria region.

The Äyrämöiset or, as the Russians call them, Evrimeiset (Russian: Эвремейсы), were a Finnish language-speaking people who lived in the Saint Petersburg Oblast and earlier also on the Finnish part of the Karelian Isthmus. Äyrämöiset were one of the two groups of Ingrian Finns, the Finnish speaking groups in St. Petersburg Oblast, the other being the Savakot. Most of the Äyrämöiset are Lutherans. The name Äyrämöiset (äkrämöiset) comes from the ancient county of Äyräpää (Äkräpää) in the Western part of the Karelian Isthmus - which was a part of the kingdom of Sweden after 1323 AD. In earlier times existed as well an agricultural deity called Äkräs (Ägräs), the god of beans, peas and hemp and the mythological forefather of the Äyrämöiset.

The Äyrämöiset made up the majority of the population of the Province of Ingria, when it was established in the 17th century. The Äyrämöiset did not mix with the immigrants from Savonia, but by the 20th century, the intermixing between them, the Savonian immigrants and the indigenous Izhorians was indistinguishable, and the Izhorians came to be known as the indigenous people of Ingria. The Äyrämöiset spoke a dialect belonging to the South Karelian dialects of Finnish. The villages of Luppolovo, Vartemyagi, Rappolovo, Toksovo, Baryshevo and Kavgolovo were all traditional areas of habitation of the Evrimeiset.

== Sources ==
- Wixman, Ronald. The Peoples of the USSR: An Ethnographic Handbook. (Armonk, New York: M. E. Sharpe, Inc, 1984) p. 17
- Olson, James S., An Ethnohistorical Dictionary of the Russian and Soviet Empires. (Westport: Greenwood Press, 1994) p. 59
