= Georg Elfvengren =

Finnish Russian Imperial Guard officer

Yrjö Elfvengren
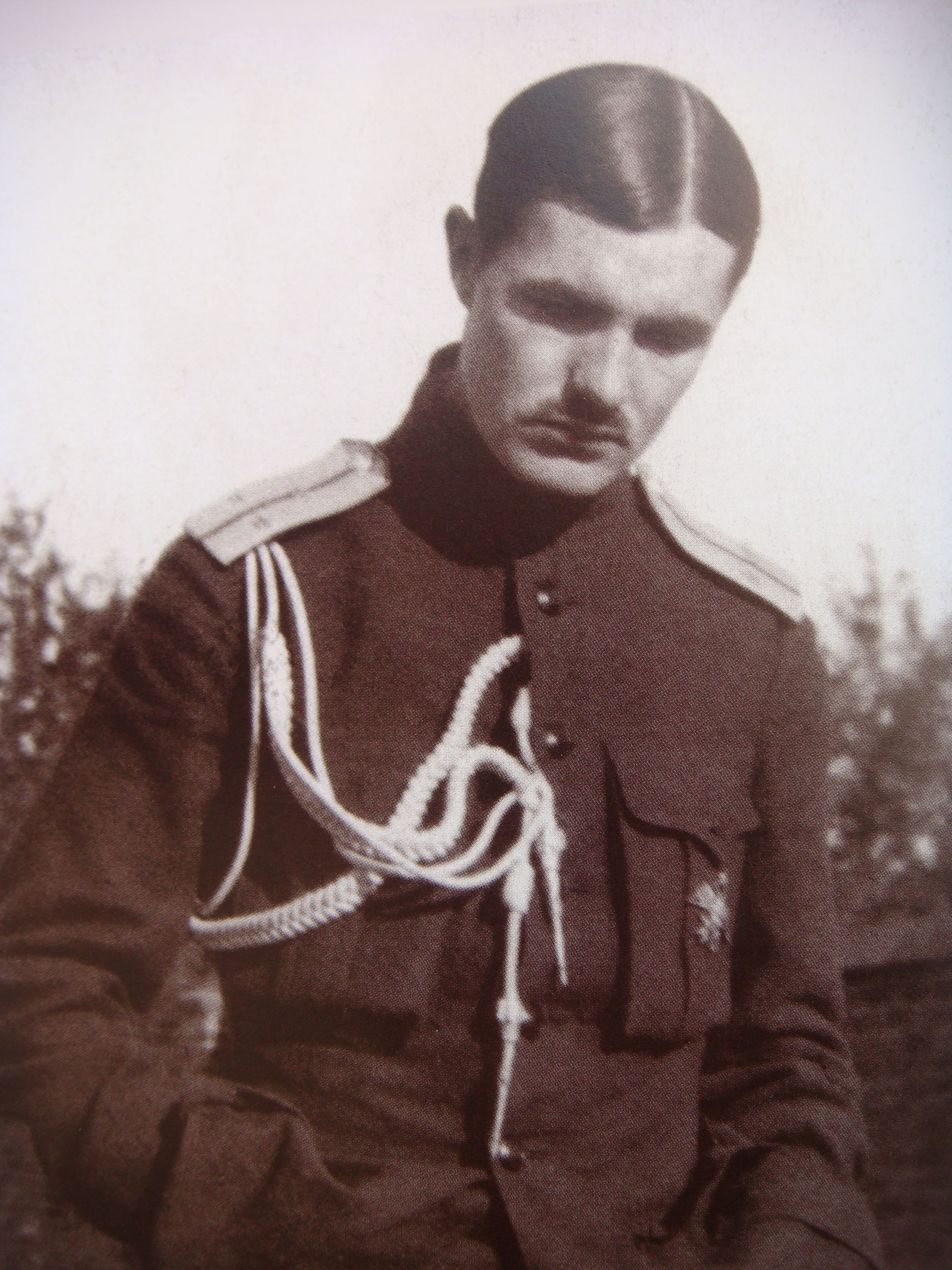

Chairman of the Provisional Committee of Northern Ingria
- In office 16 November 1919 – May 1920
- Preceded by: Juho Pekka Kokko
- Succeeded by: Jukka Tirranen

Commander-In-Chief of North Ingria
- In office 9 July 1919 – 5 December 1920
- Preceded by: Office disestablished
- Succeeded by: Office established

Personal details
- Born: 8 September 1889 Sortavala, Grand Duchy of Finland
- Died: 10 June 1927 (aged 37) Moscow, Soviet Union

Yrjö Elfvengren (8 September 1889 – 10 June 1927) was a Finnish nobleman and white officer who was Chairman of the Provisional Committee of the unrecognized state of the Republic of North Ingria.

== Background ==
Georg Elfvengren's father was the Finnish Colonel Uno-Eugen Elfvengren of the Russian army, who served as the military commissar of Pori from 1903 to 1905 and as the commander of the Turku and Pori military district from 1905 to 1908. Elfvengren studied at the Naval Cadet School and the Imperial Alexander Cadet Corps from 1900 to 1906, where he faced difficulties due to his poor command of the Russian language. On August 15, 1908, he entered the Nikolayev Cavalry School, from which he graduated on August 6, 1911. From 1911 to 1913, Georg Elfvengren served as a cornet in the Life Guard Cuirassier Regiment, based in Gatchina near St. Petersburg.

In the First World War, Georg Elfvengren successfully engaged in reconnaissance activities behind enemy lines. He was awarded the fourth class of the Order of St. George for his service. After being wounded, he was transferred to the Tsarskoye Selo military hospital. Following the murder of Grigori Rasputin, he was briefly detained for investigation, mainly due to his acquaintance with Felix Yusupov and Vladimir Purishkevich, a representative of the State Duma, and suspicion of involvement in the planning of the murders of Empress Alexandra and Anna Vyrubova. He was released after the February Revolution in March 1917.

== Anti Bolshevik action, 1917–1918 ==
During the time of the Russian Provisional Government and Kerensky's administration in 1917, Elfvengren became the vice-chairman of the Order of the Cross of St. George. Its purpose was to oppose the Bolsheviks while keeping Russia in the war alongside Britain and France. After the October Revolution in November 1917, on January 14, 1918, Elfvengren participated in a terrorist act against Lenin along with other frontline officers. In late January to early February, he became the leader of the Crimean Tatars fighting against the Soviet government.

== Commander of the North Ingrian Regiment ==
In June 1919, the interim committee of North Ingria came to request Elfvengren to become the commander of the North Ingrian Regiment, to which he agreed. The committee held control of the Kirjasalo area. At that time, the regiment consisted of 580 personnel. In July 1919, the North Ingrian Regiment conquered the border zone but suffered a defeat and had to retreat.

The next attack occurred on October 21, 1919, with 1,700 soldiers in cooperation with Nikolai Yudenich. The attackers succeeded in capturing the Kuivaisi position, Lempaala, and Miikkulainen on the shores of Lake Ladoga. However, a counterattack by the Soviet Russians forced them to retreat, and the North Ingrian Regiment withdrew back to Kirjasalo. The regiment also retained control of the Raasuli position. After this, Elfvengren was elected chairman of the interim committee of North Ingria.

Upon Elfvengren's assumption of leadership, the relations between the interim committee of North Ingria and the Northwestern Army were strengthened. A military hospital and a newspaper named Kirjasalo Sanomat were established.

== Opponent of the Russian Soviet Government, 1920–1923 ==
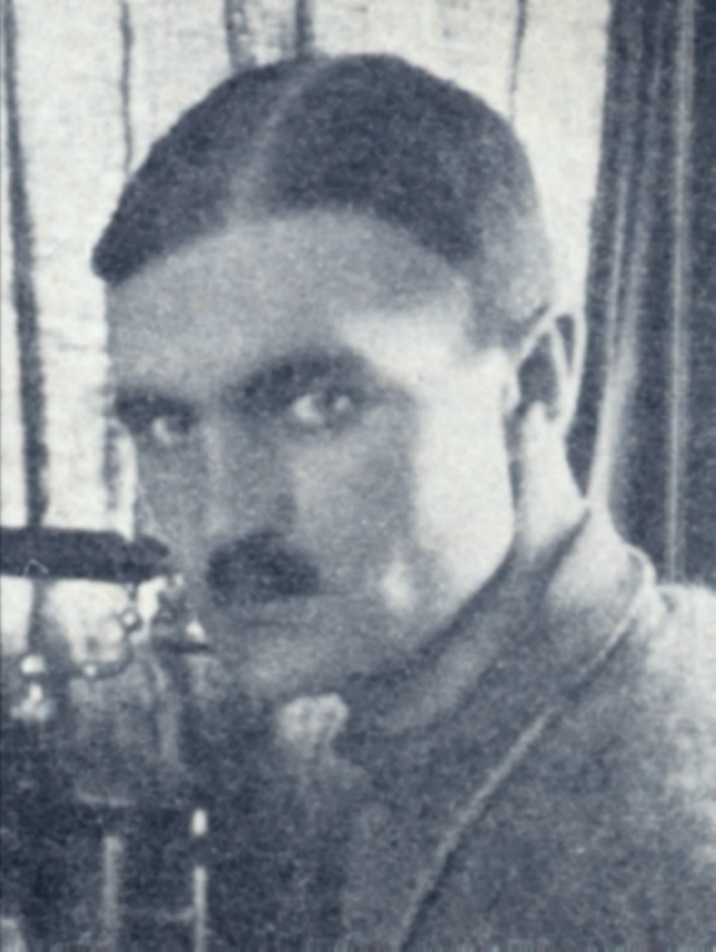
Picture of Elfvengren in 1920

In February 1920, under pressure from Finland, Elfvengren resigned from the chairmanship of the interim committee of North Ingria, after which he collaborated with the Commander-in-Chief of the White Army of South Russia, Pyotr Wrangel, and the Socialist Revolutionary Boris Savinkov. He was in contact with the rebels of the Kronstadt rebellion and the counter-revolutionary group led by Tagantsev. In 1921, Wrangel promoted Elfvengren to the rank of major general in the White Army. In June 1921, together with Boris Savinkov, he established the Citizens' Union for the Protection of Fatherland and Freedom in Warsaw, aimed at overthrowing the Soviet government.

Elfvengren was responsible for clandestine activities in Northwestern Russia, Finland, and the Baltics. In 1922, the organization attempted to assassinate the Soviet Foreign Minister Georgy Chicherin in Geneva, but the plot failed. Elfvengren has been alleged to have been involved in the assassination of Soviet diplomat Vatslav Vorovsky in 1923 in Lausanne. Elfvengren resigned from the union in 1923, and the following year, Boris Savinkov was arrested in Moscow, where he had secretly arrived.

Elfvengren subsequently worked as a businessman in Helsinki, but there is little information about his activities in his final years. In 1925, Elfvengren secretly traveled to Russia but was discovered and arrested by the OGPU. He was executed by firing squad in June 1927 in Moscow. At the same time, 19 other individuals accused of counter-revolutionary activities were also executed in response to the assassination of Soviet diplomat Pyotr Voykov, including several members of Russian noble families.
