= Ingrian Finns =

Ethnicity in Finland and Russia

Ingrians inkeriläiset ингерманландцы (part of Finns)
- Flag of Ingrians

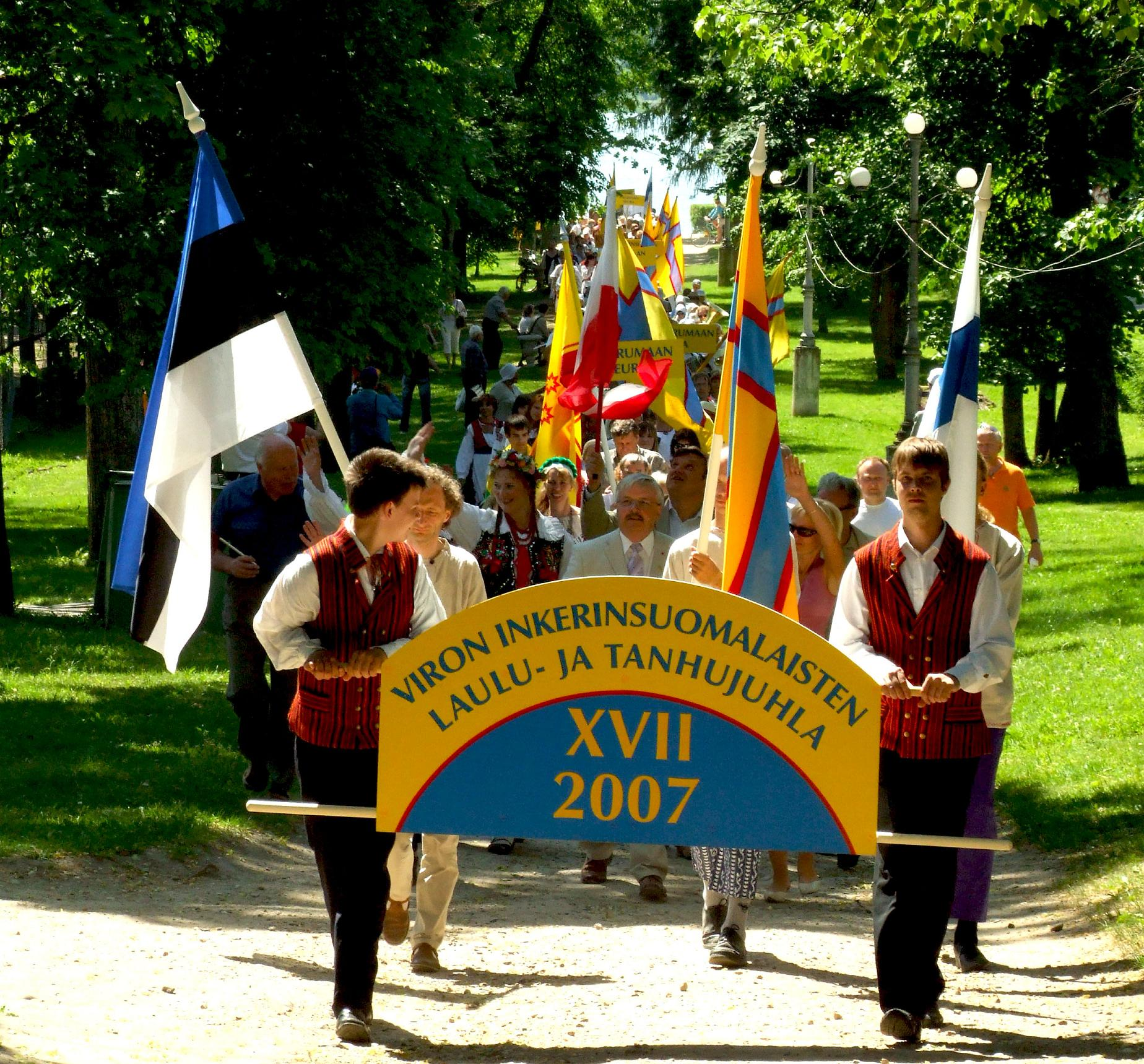
- Ingrian Finns of Estonia at the Estonian Song and Dance Festival

Total population
- c. 50,000

Regions with significant populations
- Finland, Russia
- Finland: 25,000
- Russia: 20,300 (2010)
- Sweden: 4,500 (2008)
- Ukraine: 768 (2001)
- Kazakhstan: 373 (2009)
- Estonia: 369 (2011)
- Belarus: 151 (2009)

Languages
- Finnish (Ingrian dialects), Ingrian, Votic, Estonian, Russian

Religion
- Lutheranism, Orthodox Christianity

Related ethnic groups
- Other Baltic Finns; Especially Izhorians, Votes, Estonians, and other Finns (particularly Siberian Finns and Korlaks)

Ingrian Finns (Note: Finnish: inkeriläiset, inkerinsuomalaiset; Russian: ингерманландцы, romanized: ingermanlandtsy) are the Finnish population native to Ingria, a historical region corresponding to the central part of today's Leningrad Oblast in Russia. They originated from Lutheran Finnish settlers who moved to Ingria in the 17th century, when both Finland and Ingria were parts of the Swedish Empire. During the Soviet era, particularly before and after World War II, most of them were relocated to other parts of the Soviet Union or killed in campaigns directed towards their forced deportation and genocide. Today, the Ingrian Finns constitute the largest part of the Finnish population of the Russian Federation. According to some records, some 25,000 Ingrian Finns have returned or still reside in the region of Saint Petersburg.

The term Ingrians is sometimes used as a synonym for Ingrian Finns, though it can also refer to the Izhorians or the Baltic Finnic residents of Ingria in general.

== History ==
=== Swedish Ingria ===
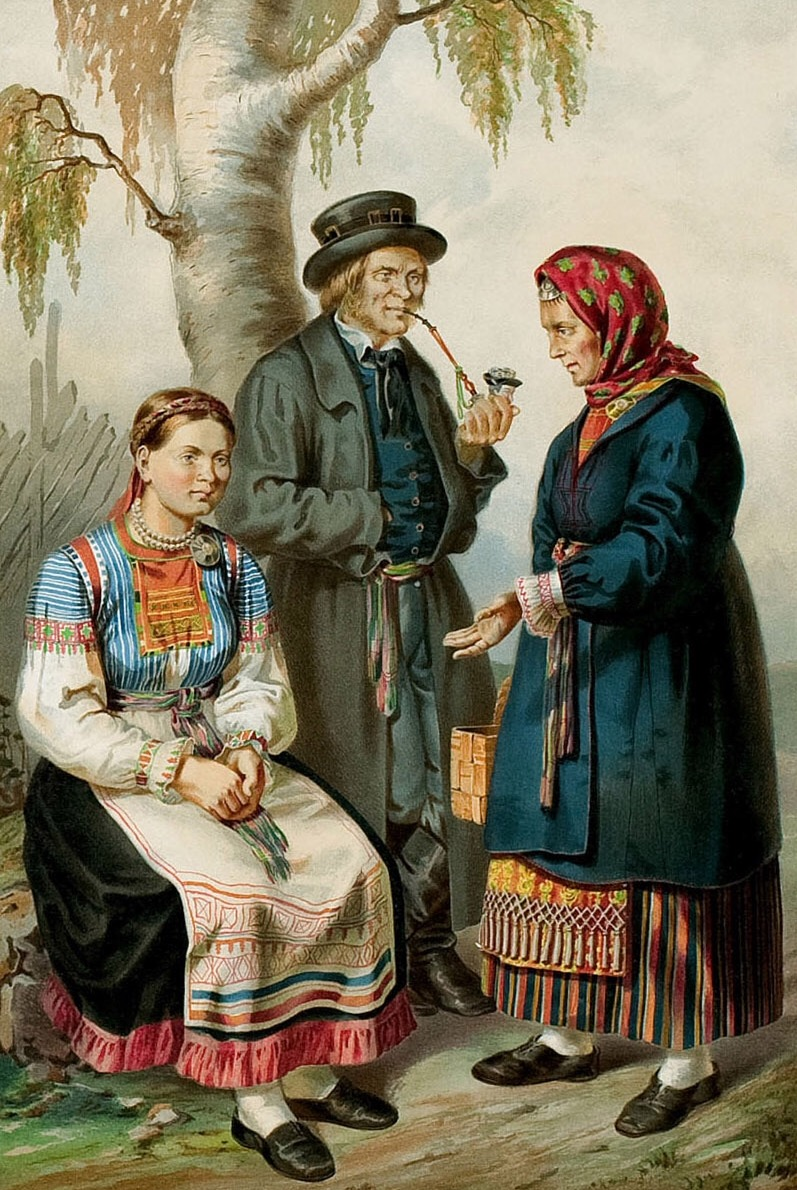
Two main subgroups of Ingrian Finns: Äyrämöiset and Savakot

During the period of Swedish rule over Ingria in 1617–1703, the region underwent a drastic demographic change that led to the emergence of the Ingrian Finns. Following the Treaty of Stolbovo in 1617, and especially after the War of Rupture in 1656–1658, a significant portion of the area's Orthodox population fled to Russia. This was largely a response to the Swedish crown's heavy taxation, and its policy of promoting Lutheranism and pressurizing the Orthodox population to convert.

The depopulated lands were subsequently settled by an influx of Lutheran migrants from Finland. These settlers consisted of two main groups: the Äyrämöiset from the Karelian Isthmus (especially from Äyräpää) and the Savakot from Savo and other parts of Finland. For many, Ingria represented a "wild east" of the Swedish empire, a frontier offering an escape from taxes and military service. The movement was mostly voluntary, but for example some Forest Finns from Närke were forced to move.

This migration led to a rapid shift in the region's ethnoreligious composition. The Lutheran Finnish population grew substantially, becoming the majority by the 1670s. By the end of the 17th century, Finns constituted approximately three-quarters of Ingria's rural population of about 60,000 people. Finns made up 41.1 percent of the population of Ingria in 1656, 53.2 percent in 1661, 55.2 percent in 1666, 56.9 percent in 1671 and 73.8 percent in 1695.

=== In the Russian Empire ===
Russia conquered Ingria in 1702–1703 during the Great Northern War and founded the city of Saint Petersburg (1703) in its center. The Treaty of Nystad in 1721 confirmed Ingria's incorporation into the Russian Empire. Under Russian rule, the Ingrian Finns became serfs: they no longer owned the land they cultivated and were forbidden to move elsewhere. Russian population grew rapidly in the region, and Orthodox Christianity became the dominant religion, while the Ingrian Finns were permitted to continue practicing Lutheranism.

Serfdom in Russia was abolished in 1861, granting the peasants the opportunity to buy their land and freeing them from extra taxes and labor obligations. The wealth of the Ingrian rural population grew, and by the end of the 19th century, many Ingrian Finns were independent peasants. In the latter half of the 19th century, the Finnish national movement gained momentum in the Grand Duchy of Finland, and Finnish national consciousness rose in Ingria as well. Various educational and cultural initiatives were established, including sports clubs, choirs and temperance associations. Lutheran parsonages served as the main cultural centers for Ingrian Finns and also housed the region's first libraries.

The Kolppana teachers' and cantors' seminary was founded in 1863. It trained teachers for Finnish-language schools and it was overseen by the Evangelical Church of Russia. The seminary educated the Ingrian intelligentsia, who spread the enlightenment to the population. Following the establishment of the seminary, Finnish-language public schools were also founded. The schools and seminary operated freely until the 1890s, when the school system began to be Russified. Compared to the Russian average, literacy remained high among the Ingrian Finns.

The first Finnish-language newspaper in Ingria, Pietarin Sanomat, began publication in 1870. Prior to that, Ingria received newspapers primarily from Vyborg. The first public library opened in Tyrö in 1850. The largest library, located in Skuoritsa, had over 2,000 books in the latter half of the 19th century. The first song festival in Ingria was held in Puutosti (Skuoritsa) in 1899.

By 1897, the number of Ingrian Finns had grown to 130,413, and by 1917 it exceeded 140,000 (45,000 in Northern Ingria, 52,000 in Central (Eastern) Ingria and 30,000 in Western Ingria, the rest in Petrograd).

=== Ingrians in the Soviet Union ===
After the 1917 Bolshevik revolution, Ingrian Finns inhabiting the southern part of the Karelian Isthmus seceded from Soviet Russia and formed the independent Republic of North Ingria, which was backed by Finland. The short-lived republic was reintegrated with Soviet Russia according to the 14 October 1920 Russian-Finnish Treaty of Tartu, and for several years thereafter it retained some degree of autonomy. From 1928 to 1939, Ingrian Finns in North Ingria constituted the Kuivaisi National District with its center in Toksova and Finnish as its official language.

The First All-Union Census of the Soviet Union in 1926 recorded 114,831 "Leningrad Finns", as Ingrian Finns were then called.

In 1928, collectivization of agriculture started in Ingria. To facilitate it, in 1929–1931, 18,000 people (4,320 families) from North Ingria were deported to East Karelia or the Kola Peninsula, as well as to Kazakhstan and other parts of Central Asia. The situation for the Ingrian Finns deteriorated further because of the Soviet plan to create restricted security zones along the borders with Finland and Estonia, free of the Finnic peoples, who were considered politically unreliable. In April 1935 7,000 people (2,000 families) were deported from Ingria to Kazakhstan, elsewhere in Central Asia, and the Ural region. In May and June 1936 20,000 people, the entire Finnish population of the parishes of Valkeasaari, Lempaala, Vuole and Miikkulainen near the Finnish border, were transferred to the area around Cherepovets. In Ingria they were replaced by people from other parts of the Soviet Union.

Initially during the Winter War, the Soviet policy was mixed. On the one hand, Stalin's government largely destroyed Ingrian Finnish culture, but on the other hand, the maintenance of a Finnish-speaking population was desired as a way to legitimize the planned occupation of Finland. The failure of the puppet Terijoki government led to the ultimate result that in 1941, Moscow officially decided that Ingrian Finns were unreliable, and in 1942 most of the Ingrian Finns remaining in Ingria were forcibly relocated to Siberia. During the Finnish and German occupation of the area, Ingrian Finns were evacuated to Finland. However, after the Continuation War, most of these Ingrian Finns, who were still Soviet citizens, were forcibly returned to the Soviet Union, where they were dispersed into Central Russia. However, some Ingrian Finns were able to flee to Sweden, and nearly 4,000 were able to remain in Finland. Ingrian Finns were largely forgotten during the presidencies of Juho Kusti Paasikivi and Urho Kekkonen.

== Present day ==
=== Finland ===
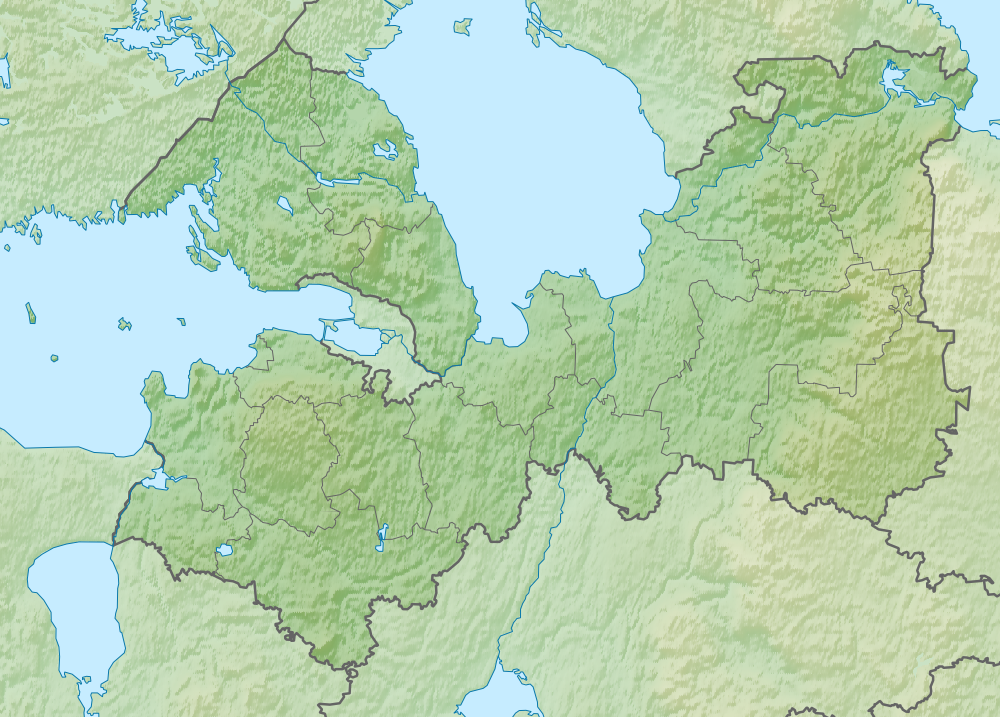
Leningrad Oblast, Russia, showing Kingisepp (Russian: Кингисепп)

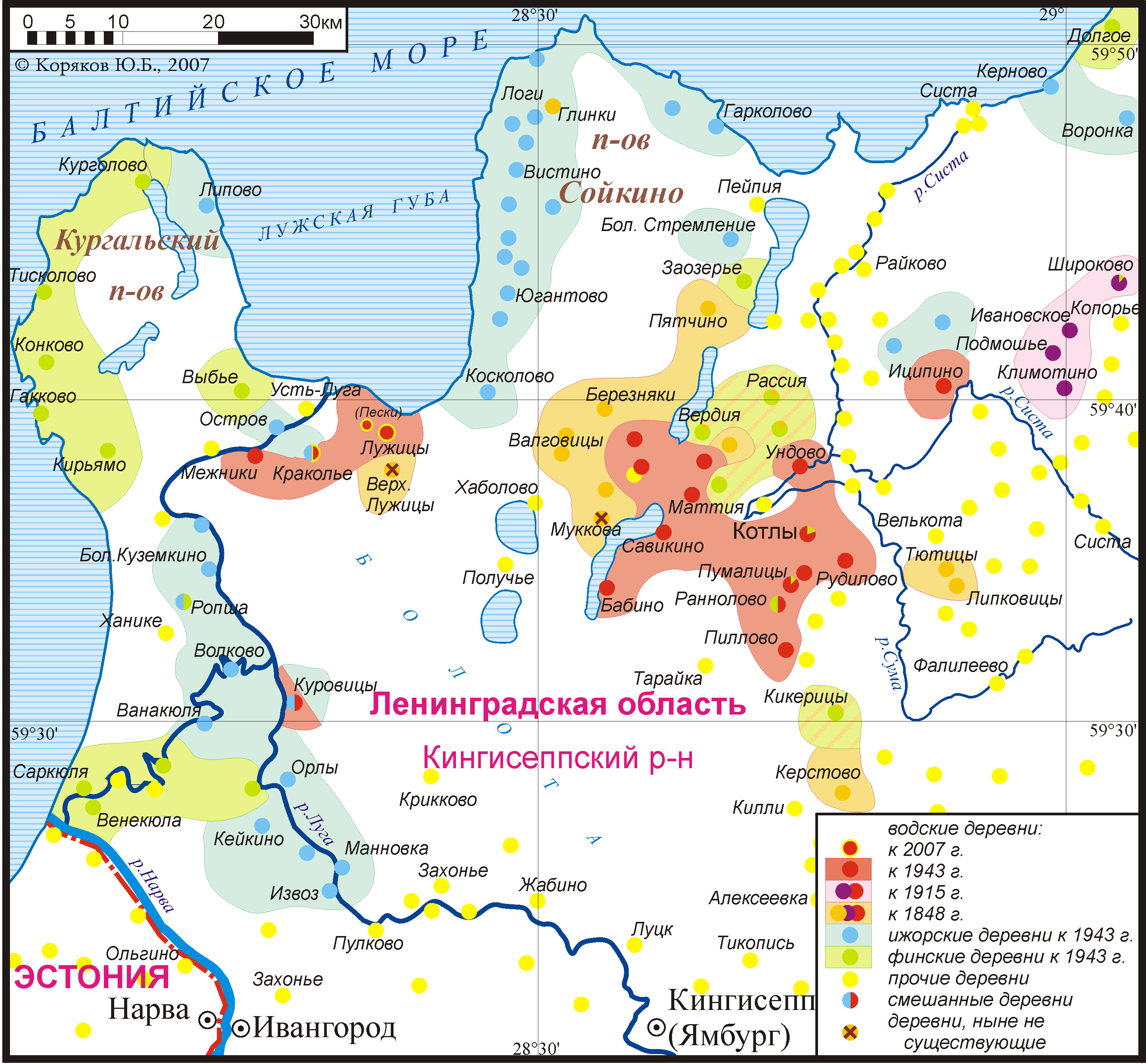
A map of Votic and neighbouring Ingrian-Finnish and Izhorian villages 1848–2007. Votic villages (1848-2007) Izhorian villages (by 1943) Finnish villages (by 1943) Other villages

From the dissolution of the Soviet Union in 1991 until 2010, about 25,000 Ingrian Finns moved from Russia and Estonia to Finland, where they were eligible for automatic residence permits under the Finnish Law of Return. In 2010, the Finnish government decided to stop the remigration. In 2006, there were still about 15,000 people in the remigration queue. In 2020, it was estimated that between 50,000 and 100,000 Ingrian Finns were living in Finland.

Many Ingrian Finns, including mixed families, who moved to Finland did not speak any language other than Russian and in many cases still identify as Russians. There are social integration problems similar to those of any other migrant group in Europe, to such an extent that there is a political debate in Finland over the retention of the Finnish Law of Return. In contrast, native Finnish-speakers have been easily assimilated into mainstream Finnish culture, leaving little trace of Ingrian Finnish traditions.

=== Estonia ===
In Estonia, the Ingrian Finns were the first national minority to implement the National Minorities Cultural Autonomy Act after the restoration of independence, holding elections for their cultural council in May 2004. The 2011 census counted 369 Ingrian Finns in Estonia.

=== Russia ===
In Russia, many Ingrian Finns are members of the Evangelical Lutheran Church of Ingria. The Evangelical Lutheran Church of Ingria has historically been closely associated with the Ingrian Finns and was originally focused primarily on serving ethnic Finns in Ingria.

The number of people who declared their nationality as Finnish in the 2010 Russian census was 20,000, down from 47,000 in 1989.

== Genetics ==
In terms of autosomal DNA, Ingrian Finns are close to Finns from Finland and other Baltic Finnic groups. About 10 percent of their admixture is Siberian.

The majority of Ingrian Finnish men belong to the paternal haplogroup N1c, which is typical for Finns and other Finno-Ugric peoples. Their second most common Y-haplogroup is I1. In terms of Y-DNA, Ingrian Finns are closest to Finns from Finland (especially Eastern Finns) and Karelians from White Karelia.

Half of Ingrian Finns belong to the maternal haplogroup H and 19.4 percent carry U5. Their other mtDNA haplogroups include T (11.1 %), V (5.6 %) and W (5.6 %).

== See also ==
- Siberian Finns
- Kola Norwegians
- Karelians
- Tornedalians
- Skogfinner
- Sweden Finns
- Finland-Swedes
- Kvens
- Murmansk Finns

== Sources ==
- Engman, Max (2005). Suureen itään: Suomalaiset Venäjällä ja Aasiassa. Suomalaisen siirtolaisuuden historia (in Finnish). Turku: Siirtolaisuusinstituutti. ISBN 978-951-9266-84-8.
