= Ingria =

Historical region in northwestern Russia

Ingria Izhora
- Historical region
- Ingermanland (yellow) in St. Petersburg and the surrounding Leningrad region and Gatchina (red point), the administrative center of Leningrad region
- Demonym: Izhorians; Votes; Ingrian Finns; Russians; Estonians
- Area
  - Coordinates: 59°38′N 29°18′E
- Today part of: Russia

Ingria or Ingermanland is a historical region in northwestern Russia, encompassing the area around the Neva River, the southeastern shore of the Gulf of Finland, and the southwestern shore of Lake Ladoga. Its historical boundaries extended to the Narva River in the west and the Sestra River in the north, while its southern boundary was less clearly defined.

The Votians and Izhorians, both Baltic Finnic peoples, are among the indigenous peoples of Ingria. Following the incorporation of Ingria into the Swedish Empire under the Treaty of Stolbovo in 1617, Lutheran Finnish-speaking settlers migrated to the region, principally from Savonia and the Karelian Isthmus. Their descendants became known as the Ingrian Finns.

In 1919–1920, during the Russian Civil War, the short-lived Republic of North Ingria controlled a small area of northern Ingria near the Finnish border.The territory was returned to Soviet Russia following the Treaty of Tartu in 1920. During the Soviet period, the region underwent major demographic changes, including the deportation and dispersal of much of the Ingrian Finnish population and increasing assimilation of the region's Finnic minorities.

Historic Ingria covers approximately the same area as the Gatchinsky, Kingiseppsky, Kirovsky, Lomonosovsky, Tosnensky, Volosovsky and Vsevolozhsky districts of modern Leningrad Oblast as well as the city of Saint Petersburg.

== History ==
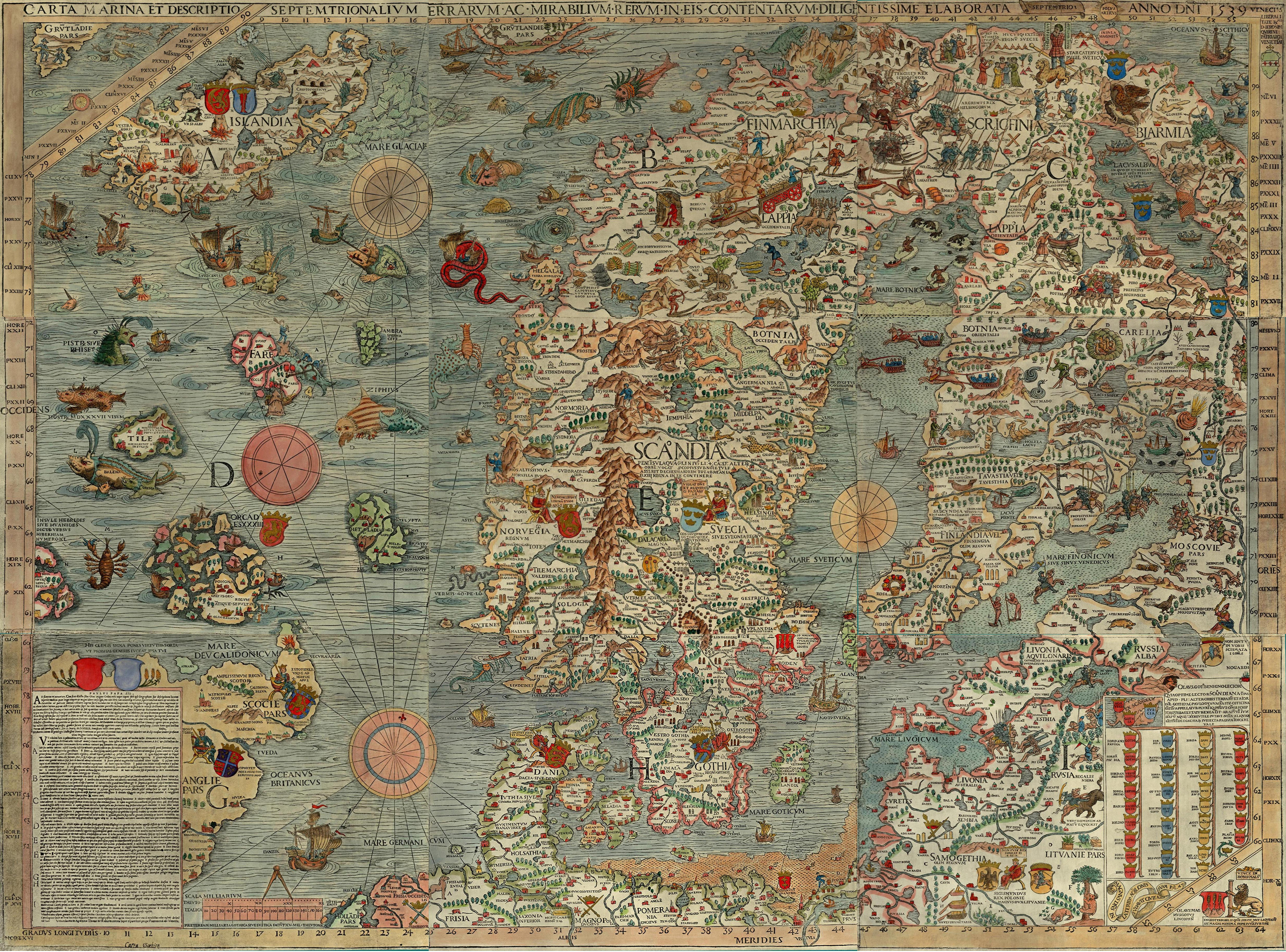
Ingria may be seen represented in the easternmost part of the Carta Marina (1539).

In the Viking era (late Iron Age), from the 750s onwards, Ladoga served as a bridgehead on the Varangian trade route to Eastern Europe. A mixed slavic-varangian aristocracy developed that would ultimately rule over Novgorod and Kievan Rus'. In the 860s, the warring Finnic and Slavic tribes rebelled under Vadim the Bold, but later asked the Varangians under Rurik to return and to put an end to the recurring conflicts between them.

The Swedes referred to the ancient Novgorodian land of Vod people as Ingermanland, Latinized to Ingria. The origin of the name is uncertain, but there are several possible explanations. One explanation is that the name comes from the River Inger, a southern tributary of the Neva River. Another explanation is based on the Norwegian Eymund's saga, which tells the story of the Swedish princess Ingegerd Olofsdotter, who married Yaroslav the Wise, Grand Prince of Novgorod and Kiev in 1019. According to the saga, she received Ladoga and the surrounding lands as a wedding gift from Yaroslav, and the region came to be known as Ingegerd's land, or Ingermanland. The lands were administered by Swedish jarls, such as Ragnvald Ulfsson, under the sovereignty of the Novgorod Republic.

In the 12th century, Western Ingria was absorbed by the Novgorod Republic. There followed centuries of frequent wars, chiefly between Novgorod and Sweden, and occasionally involving Denmark and Teutonic Knights as well. The Teutonic Knights established a stronghold in the town of Narva, followed by the Russian castle Ivangorod on the opposite side of the Narva River in 1492.

With the consolidation of the Kievan Rus and the expansion of the Republic of Novgorod north, the indigenous Ingrians became Eastern Orthodox. Ingria became a province of Sweden in the Treaty of Stolbovo in 1617 that ended the Ingrian War, fought between Sweden and Russia. After the Swedish conquest of the area in 1617 the Ingrian Finns, descendants of 17th-century Lutheran emigrants from present-day Finland, became the majority in Ingria. In 1710, following a Russian conquest, Ingria was designated as the Province of St. Petersburg.

In the Treaty of Nystad in 1721, Sweden formally ceded Ingria to Russia. A large Finnish-speaking community continued to live in Ingria, and Finns remained the second-largest ethnic group in the St Petersburg region (after Russians) until the 1920s. St Petersburg had a Finnish Lutheran Church and Finnish language school. In 1927 the Soviet authorities designated the area as Leningrad Province. Deportations of the Ingrian Finns started in the late 1920s, and Russification was nearly complete by the 1940s.

In the modern era, Ingria forms the northwestern anchor of Russia—its "window" on the Baltic Sea—with Saint Petersburg as its centre.

== Swedish Ingria ==
Although Sweden and Novgorod had fought for the Ingrian lands more or less since the Great Schism of 1054, the first actual attempt to establish Swedish dominion in Ingria appears to date from the early 14th century, when Sweden first founded the settlement of Viborg in Karelia and then the fortress Landskrona (built in 1299 or 1300) at the confluence of the Ohta and Neva rivers. However, Novgorod re-conquered Landskrona in 1301 and destroyed it. Ingria eventually became a Swedish dominion in the 1580s, but the Treaty of Teusina (1595) returned it to Russia in 1595. Russia in its turn ceded Ingria to Sweden in the Treaty of Stolbova (1617) after the Ingrian War of 1610–1617. Sweden's interest in the territory was mainly strategic: the area served as a buffer zone against Russian attacks on the Karelian Isthmus and on present-day Finland, then the eastern half of the Swedish realm; and Russian Baltic trade had to pass through Swedish territory. The townships of Ivangorod, Jama (now Kingisepp), Caporie (now Koporye) and Nöteborg (now Shlisselburg) became the centres of the four Ingrian counties (slottslän), and consisted of citadels, in the vicinity of which were small boroughs called hakelverk – before the wars of the 1650s mainly inhabited by Russian townspeople. The degree to which Ingria became the destination for Swedish deportees has often been exaggerated.

Ingria remained sparsely populated. In 1664 the total population amounted to 15,000. Swedish attempts to introduce Lutheranism, which accelerated after an initial period of relative religious tolerance, met with repugnance on the part of the majority of the Orthodox peasantry, who were obliged to attend Lutheran services; converts were promised grants and tax reductions, but Lutheran gains were mostly due to voluntary resettlements by Finns from Savonia and Finnish Karelia (mostly from Äyräpää). The proportion of Lutheran Finns in Ingria (Ingrian Finns) comprised 41.1% in 1656, 53.2% in 1661, 55.2% in 1666, 56.9% in 1671 and 73.8% in 1695, the remainder being Russians, Izhorians and Votes. Ingermanland was to a considerable extent enfiefed to noble military and state officials, who brought their own Lutheran servants and workmen. However, a small number of Russian Orthodox churches remained in use until the very end of the Swedish dominion, and the forceful conversion of ethnic Russian Orthodox forbidden by law.

Nyen became the main trading centre of Ingria, especially after Ivangorod dwindled, and in 1642 it was made the administrative centre of the province. In 1656 a Russian attack badly damaged the town, and the administrative centre moved to Narva.

== Russian Ingria ==
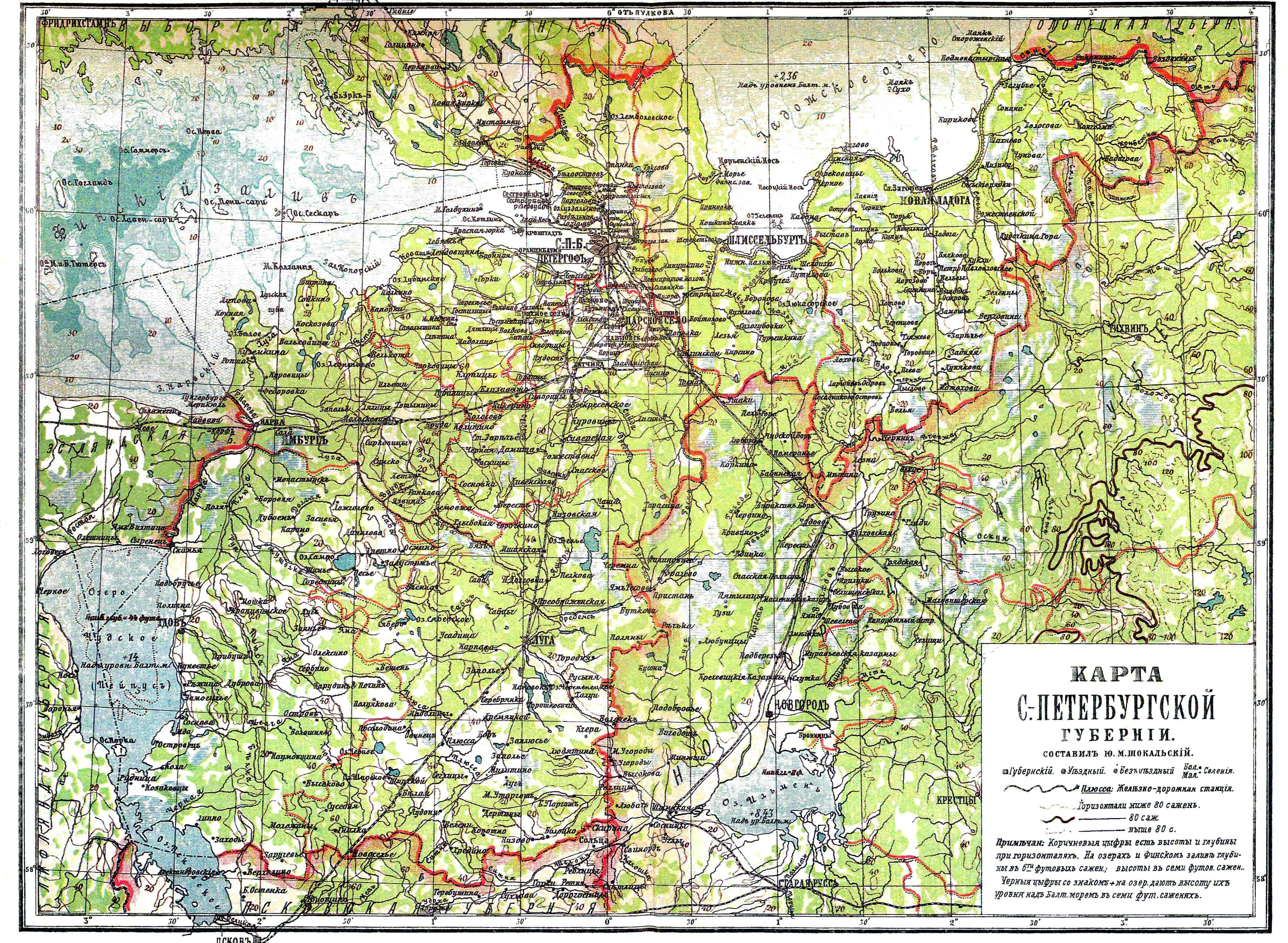
Map of Saint Petersburg Governorate in 1900

In the early 18th century the area was reconquered by Russia in the Great Northern War after having been in Swedish possession for about 100 years. Near the location of the Swedish town Nyen, close to the Neva river's estuary at the Gulf of Finland, the new Russian capital Saint Petersburg was founded in 1703.

Peter the Great raised Ingria to the status of a duchy with Prince Menshikov as its first (and last) duke. In 1708, Ingria was designated a governorate (Ingermanland Governorate in 1708–1710, Saint Petersburg Governorate in 1710–1914, Petrograd Governorate in 1914–1924, Leningrad Governorate in 1924–1927).

In 1870, printing started of the first Finnish-language newspaper in Ingria, Pietarin Sanomat. Before that Ingria received newspapers mostly from Viborg. The first public library was opened in 1850 in Tyrö. The largest of the libraries, situated in Skuoritsa, had more than 2,000 volumes in the second half of the 19th century. In 1899 the first song festival in Ingria was held in Puutosti (Skuoritsa).

By 1897 (year of the Russian Empire Census) the number of Ingrian Finns had grown to 130,413, and by 1917 it had exceeded 140,000 (45,000 in Northern Ingria, 52,000 in Central (Eastern) Ingria and 30,000 in Western Ingria, the rest in Petrograd).

From 1868 Estonians began to migrate to Ingria as well. In 1897 the number of Estonians inhabiting the Saint Petersburg Governorate reached 64,116 (12,238 of them in Saint Petersburg itself); by 1926 it had increased to 66,333 (15,847 of them in Leningrad).

As to Izhorians, in 1834 there were 17,800 of them, in 1897—21,000, in 1926—26,137. About 1000 Ingrians lived in the area ceded to Estonia under the Peace Treaty of Tartu (1920).

== Estonian Ingria ==
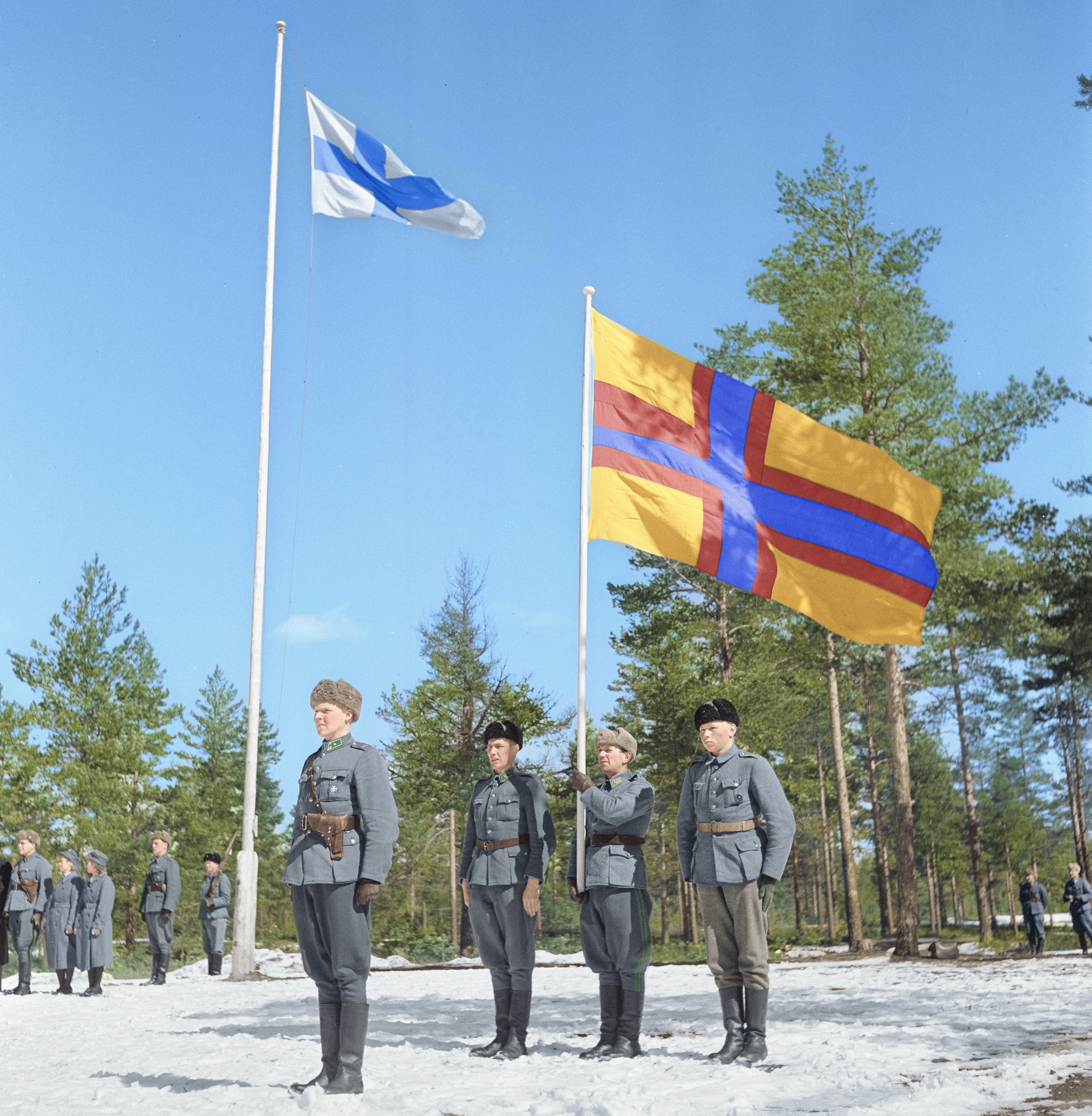
An Ingrian battalion that served in the Finnish Defense Forces during the Continuation War, giving their oath to Finland in the Karelian Isthmus, 27 April 1944.

Under the Russian-Estonian Peace Treaty of Tartu of 1920, a small part of West Ingria became part of the Republic of Estonia. In contrast to other parts of Ingria, Finnish culture blossomed in this area, known as Estonian Ingria. This was to a large extent due to the work of Leander Reijo (also Reijonen or Reiju) from Kullankylä on the new border between Estonia and the Soviet Union, who was called "The King of Ingria" by the Finnish press. Finnish schools and a Finnish newspaper were started. A church was built in Kallivieri in 1920 and by 1928 the parish had 1,300 people.

In 1945, after the Second World War, Estonian Ingria, then in the Soviet Union, was transferred to the Russian SFSR and incorporated into the Leningrad Oblast. Since Estonia reclaimed its independence in 1991, this territory has been disputed. As Russia does not recognize the Treaty of Tartu, the area currently remains under Russian control.

== Soviet Ingria ==
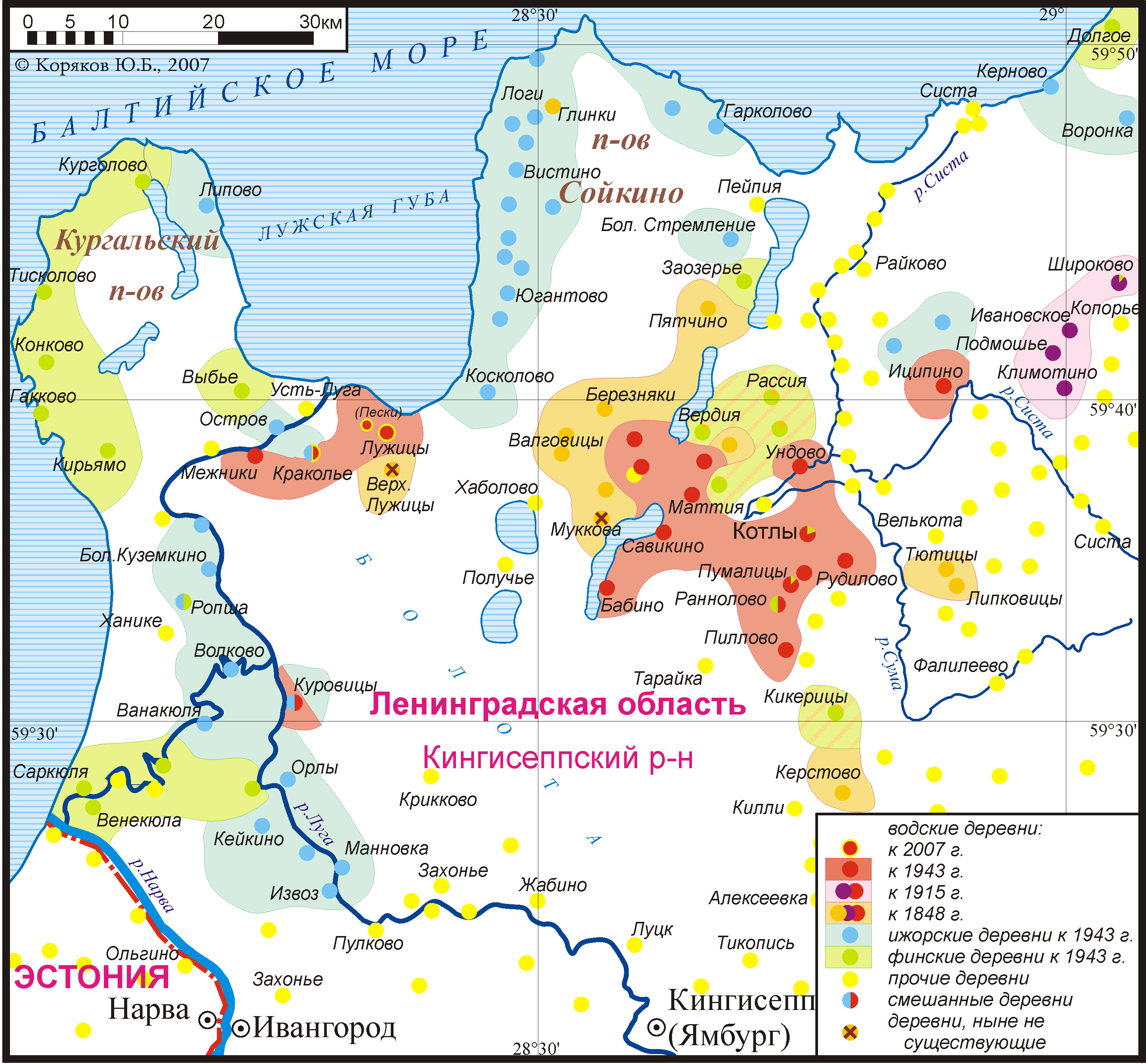
Finnic settlements in Western Ingria throughout the 20th century

After the 1917 Bolshevik revolution in Russia, the Republic of North Ingria (Finnish: Pohjois-Inkerin tasavalta) declared its independence from Russia with the support of Finland and with the aim of incorporation into Finland. It ruled parts of Ingria from 1919 until 1920. With the Russian-Finnish Peace Treaty of Tartu it was re-integrated into Russia, but enjoyed a certain degree of autonomy.

At its height in the 1920s, there were about 300 Finnish language schools and 10 Finnish language newspapers in Ingria.

The First All-Union Census of the Soviet Union in 1926 recorded 114,831 Leningrad Finns, as Ingrian Finns were called. The 1926 census also showed that the Russian population of central Ingria outnumbered the Finnic peoples living there, but Ingrian Finns formed the majority in the districts along the Finnish border.

In the early 1930s the Izhorian language was taught in the schools of the Soikinsky Peninsula and the area around the mouth of the Luga River.

In 1928 collectivization of agriculture started in Ingria. To facilitate it, in 1929–1931, 18,000 people (4320 families), kulaks (independent peasants) from North Ingria, were deported to East Karelia, the Kola Peninsula as well as Kazakhstan and Central Asia.

The situation for the Ingrian Finns deteriorated further when in the fall of 1934 the Forbidden Border Zone along the western border of the Soviet Union was established, where entrance was forbidden without special permission issued by the NKVD. It was officially only 7.5 km (5 miles) deep initially, but along the Estonian border it extended to as much as 90 km (60 miles). The zone was to be free of Finnic and some other peoples, who were considered politically unreliable. On 25 March 1935, Genrikh Yagoda authorized a large-scale deportation targeting Estonian, Latvian and Finnish kulaks and lishentsy residing in the border regions near Leningrad. About 7,000 people (2,000 families) were deported from Ingria to Kazakhstan, Central Asia and the Ural region. In May and June 1936 the entire Finnish population of the parishes of Valkeasaari, Lempaala, Vuole and Miikkulainen near the Finnish border, 20,000 people, were resettled to the areas around Cherepovets and Siberia in the next wave of deportations. In Ingria they were replaced with people from other parts of the Soviet Union, mostly Russians but also Ukrainians and Tatars.

In 1937 Lutheran churches and Finnish and Izhorian schools in Ingria were closed down and publications and radio broadcasting in Finnish and Izhorian were suspended.

Both Ingrian Finnish and Izhorian populations all but disappeared from Ingria during the Soviet period. 63,000 fled to Finland during World War II, and were required back by Stalin after the war. Most became victims of Soviet population transfers and many were executed as "enemies of the people". The remainder, including some post-Stalin returnees (it was not until 1956 that some of the deported were allowed to return to their villages), were outnumbered by Russian immigration.

The 1959 census recorded 1,062 Izhorians; in 1979 that number had fallen to 748, only 315 of them around the mouth of the Luga River and on the Soikinsky Peninsula. According to the Soviet census of 1989, there were 829 Izhorians, 449 of them in Russia (including other parts of the country) and 228 in Estonia.

== See also ==
- Ingrian War
- Leningrad Oblast
- Saint Petersburg Governorate
- Tuutari (parish)
- North Ingria
- Swedish Ingria
- Evangelical Lutheran Church of Ingria
- Postage stamps and postal history of North Ingria
- Free Ingria
