= Lembolovo =

Locality in Vsevolozhsky District, Leningrad Oblast, Russia

Coordinates: 60°25′N 30°20′E

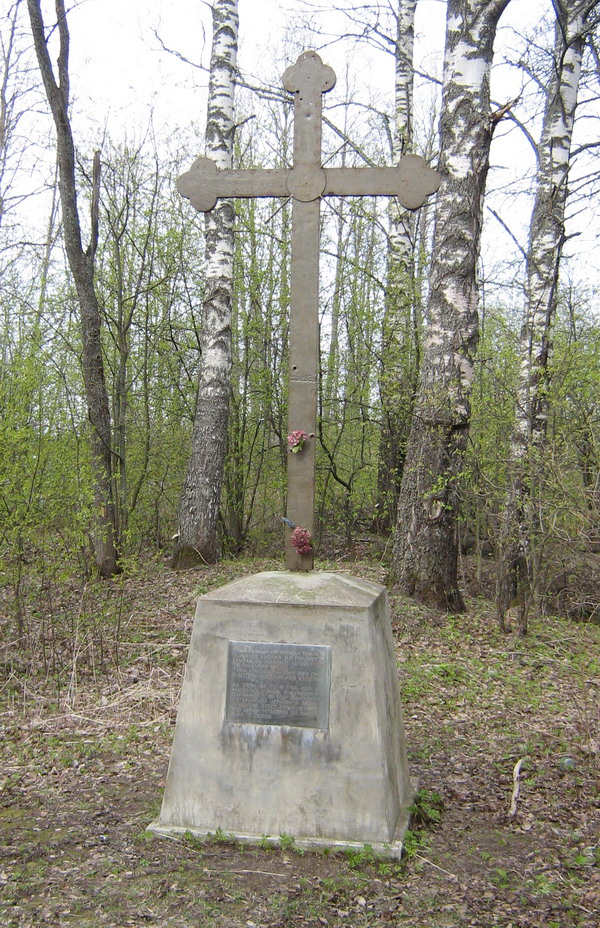
Memorial in Lembolovo, and forest setting

Lembolovo (Russian: Лемболово; Finnish: Lempaala) is a rural locality in Vsevolozhsky District of Leningrad Oblast, Russia, located on the Karelian Isthmus.

== Transportation ==
It has a station on the Saint Petersburg-Hiitola railroad.
