= Finglish (disambiguation) =

Finglish is the Finnish language mixed with English.

Finglish may also refer to:

- American Finnish the form of Finnish in Canada and the United States.
- Fingilish, the casual romanization of Persian alphabet
- Finglish, informal Fijian English language also known as Fijian Creole
- Finglish (also Fingilish, Pinglish), Persian written with English letters Romanization of Persian

== See also ==
- Philippine English
- Franglais, or Frenglish, a mixture of French and English
