= Findians =

Ethnic group in North America

Fintiaanit
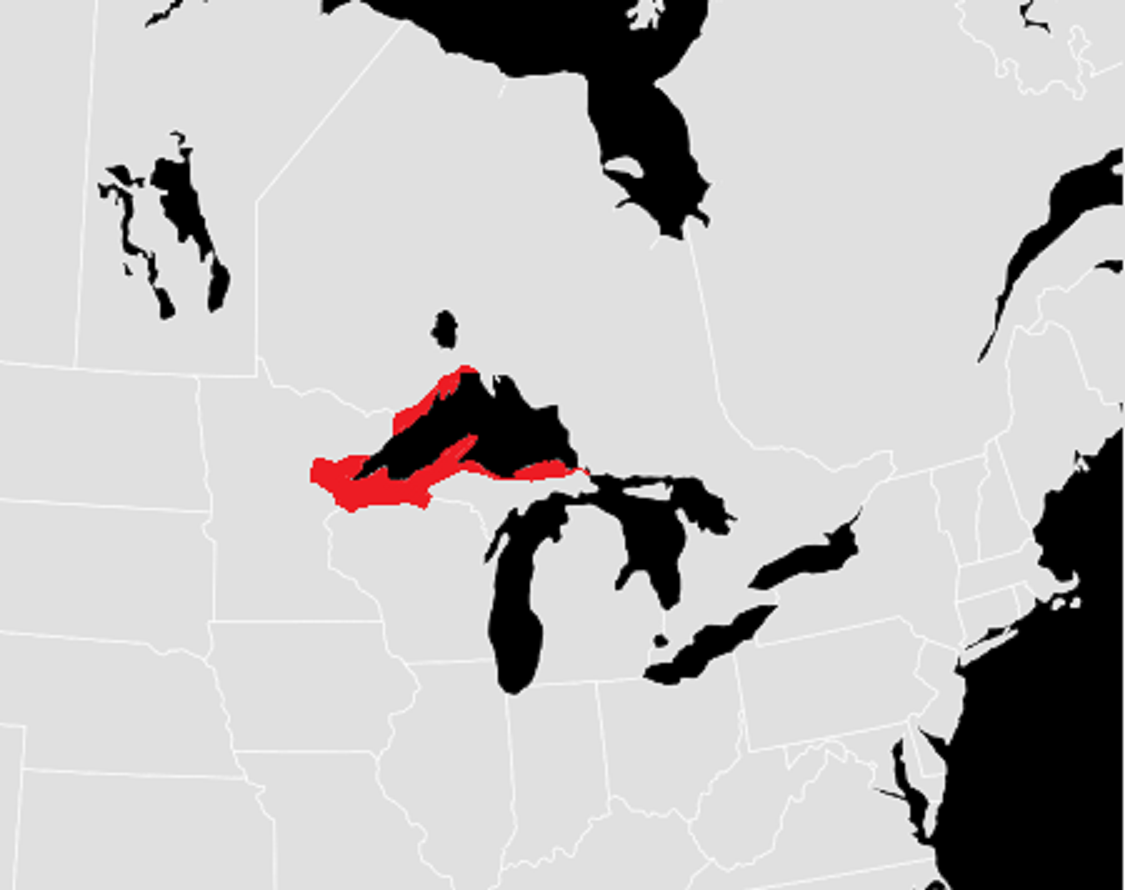
- Distribution of Findians around the Great Lakes in the United States and Canada

Total population
- c. 200–9,000

Regions with significant populations
- Around the Great Lakes in the United States and Canada

Languages
- Ojibwe, English, Fingelska†, Swedish†

Related ethnic groups
- Ojibwe, Finnish Canadians, Finnish Americans, Lake Superior Chippewa, Métis

Findians or Finndians (Finnish: fintiaanit; Swedish: findianer) are American or Canadian people that descend from the mix of Finnish Americans or Finnish Canadians and Indigenous peoples of North America, mainly the Ojibwe. Most Findians today live around the Great Lakes in Canada and the United States.

The population number of Findians is unknown, but it could be between a few hundred and a few thousand.

== History ==
Most of the Findians descend from Finns that emigrated to the United States from Finland from 1860 to 1924 and the Ojibwe.

When the Ojibwe and Finns met, they taught each other cultural elements, such as hunting skills and architecture.

== Modern status ==
The American Finnish language is no longer spoken by the Findians. However, many of them retain Finnish surnames. Some are also able to speak the Ojibwe language.

== Culture ==
Finnish saunas are common in Findian homes, as is the Finnish idea of sisu - "stoic determination, tenacity of purpose."

== Notable people ==
=== Americans of both Finnish and Indigenous North American descent ===
- Richard Dean Anderson (born 1950), actor of Mohawk descent
- Cheri Honkala (born 1963), politician of Cheyenne descent
- Erica Lord (born 1978), artist of Iñupiaq/Athabascan descent
- Ahrue Luster (born 1978), guitarist of Cherokee descent
- Arvo Mikkanen (born 1961), Assistant United States Attorney of Comanche descent
- Jennifer Tilly (born 1958), Canadian-American actress and poker player of Native American descent
- Meg Tilly (born 1960), Canadian-American actress and writer of Native American descent
- Mark Webber (born 1980), actor of Cheyenne descent

=== Canadians of both Finnish and Indigenous North American descent ===
- Jaime Black, activist and artist of Anishinaabe descent
- Natasha Fisher, musician of Ojibwe descent
- Arianna Grace (born 1997), professional wrestler and beauty pageant contestant of Métis descent
- Frank St. Marseille (born 1939), ice hockey player of Ojibwe-Métis descent

== See also ==
- Indigenous peoples in Canada
- Native Americans in the United States

== Literature ==
- Kettu, Katja (writer) & Koutaniemi, Meeri (photographer) & Seppälä, Maria (writer) (2016). Fintiaanien mailla. WSOY. ISBN 9789510411599.
