= Finnish Canadians =

Canadians of Finnish ancestry

Kanadansuomalaiset (Finnish) Kanadafinländare (Swedish) Finno-canadiens (French)
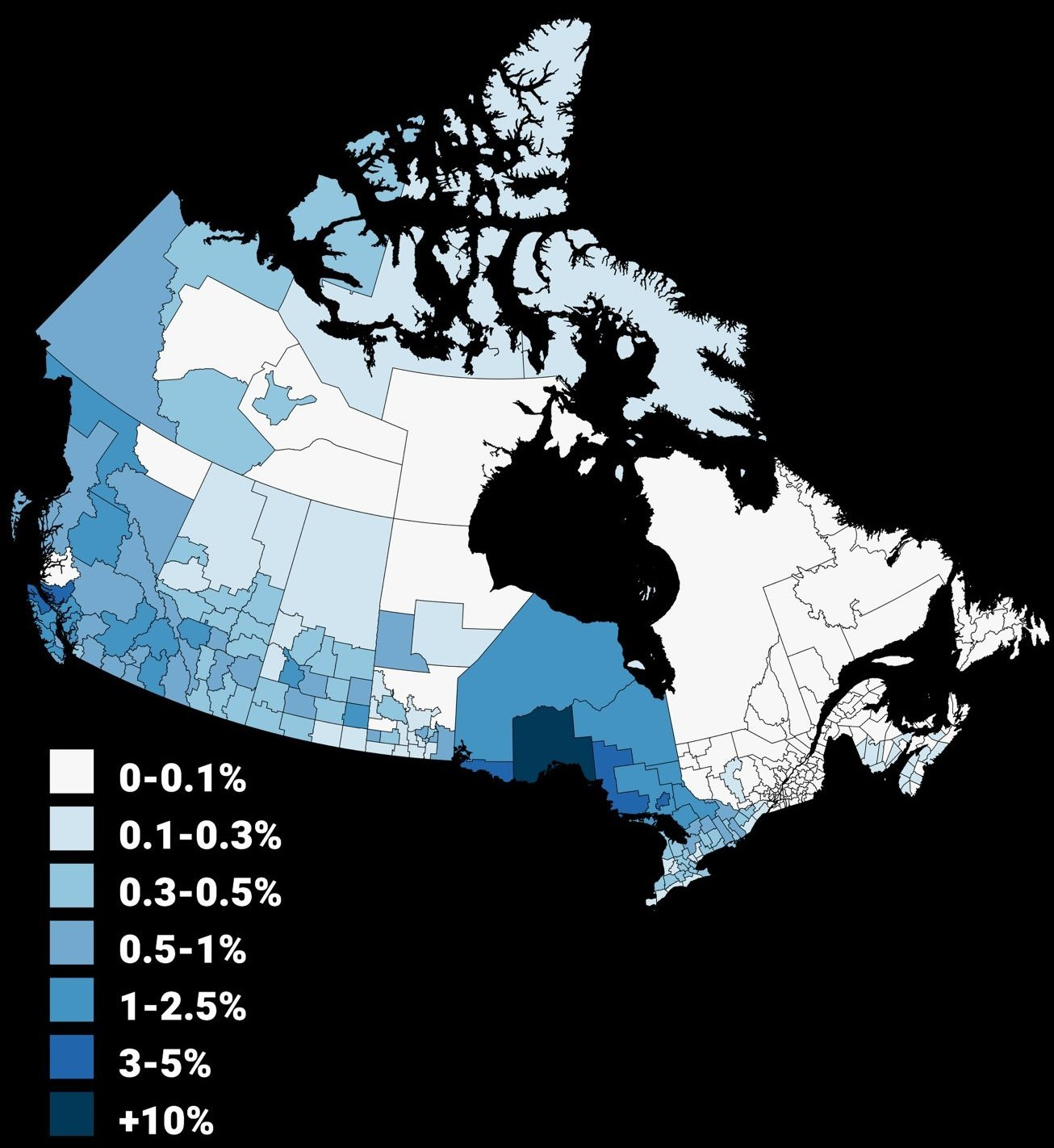
- Population distribution of Finnish Canadians by census division, 2021 census

Total population
- 143,645; 0.4% of the Canadian population

Regions with significant populations
- Toronto; Thunder Bay; Greater Sudbury; Vancouver
- Ontario: 74,505
- British Columbia: 31,610
- Alberta: 16,285

Languages
- Finnish; Canadian English; Canadian French

Religion
- Christianity (Lutheranism, Protestantism)

Related ethnic groups
- Finnish Americans, Estonian Canadians, Estonian Americans

Finnish Canadians (Finnish: Kanadansuomalaiset) are Canadian citizens of Finnish ancestry or Finns who emigrated to and reside in Canada. In 2016, 143,645 Canadians claimed Finnish ancestry. Finns started coming to Canada in the early 1880s, and in much larger numbers in the early 20th century and well into the mid-20th century. Finnish immigration to Canada was often a direct result of economic depressions and wars, or in the aftermath of major conflicts like the Finnish Civil War. Canada was often chosen as a final destination because of the similarity in climate and natural conditions, while employment in logging or homesteading attracted landless farmers in the early 20th century. Migratory movements of Finns between Canada and the United States was very common as well.

In the early 20th century, newly arrived Finnish immigrants to Canada quickly became involved in political organizations, churches, athletic clubs and other forms of associational life. Halls and co-operatives were often erected in communities with sizable Finnish populations. "Finnish Canadians" pioneered efforts to establish co-operatives in several Canadian cities. Canada's largest co-operative, the Consumers' Co-operative Society, was started by Finns.

The 2011 Census recorded 136,215 Canadians who claimed Finnish ancestry, an increase compared to the 2006 Census.

== History ==
Finnish Canadian Population History
| Year | Pop. | ±% |
|---|---|---|
| 1901 | 2,502 | — |
| 1911 | 15,500 | +519.5% |
| 1921 | 21,494 | +38.7% |
| 1931 | 43,885 | +104.2% |
| 1941 | 41,683 | −5.0% |
| 1951 | 41,683 | +0.0% |
| 1961 | 59,436 | +42.6% |
| 1971 | 59,215 | −0.4% |
| 1981 | 52,315 | −11.7% |
| 1986 | 91,335 | +74.6% |
| 1991 | 99,095 | +8.5% |
| 1996 | 108,720 | +9.7% |
| 2001 | 114,690 | +5.5% |
| 2006 | 131,045 | +14.3% |
| 2011 | 136,215 | +3.9% |
| 2016 | 143,640 | +5.5% |
Source: Statistics Canada Note: 1981 Canadian census did not include multiple ethnic origin responses, thus population is an undercount.

The earliest Finnish immigrants to Canada came from the US, possibly as early as the 1820s for the construction of the Welland Canal. The Canadian Pacific Railway recruited immigrants directly from Finland in the late 1800s.

Canadians of Finnish ancestry often formed a large percentage of left-wing organizations during the early 1900s, as Finland had, by 1906 as a part of the Russian empire, already become one of the first nations to adopt universal suffrage. Up until the early 1940s, the so-called "Red Finns," who held deep socialist convictions, far outnumbered "White Finns," the more religious and conservative Finns. This was partially due to the number of political refugees escaping persecution after the Finnish Civil War, but also attributable to the response of several, formerly apolitical Finns from rural Ostrobothnia, to harsh economic conditions. Finnish Canadians with Marxist political views aligned themselves with the Social Democratic Party of Canada and later, with the Communist Party of Canada, centered around the newspaper Vapaus (Freedom). Many Finns, however, were distrustful of politicians as a result of the perceived failure and reformism of the Finnish Social Democratic Party during the general strike in November 1917 and the reformist policy the party adopted after the Civil War. Finns arriving in Canada who had already faced severe class conflict and repression would line-up with the radical union, the Industrial Workers of the World (IWW) emphasizing anti-authoritarianism and anti-statism. The IWW would hold considerable influence in the mines and logging camps of Northern Ontario.

A decline in the Finnish-Canadian population began with the exodus of 2,000–3,000 skilled workers and loggers to Soviet Karelia in the 1920s and 30s; there were also a substantial number of Finnish-Canadian volunteers in the Spanish Civil War. Finnish-Canadians, along with Ukrainians, formed the largest section of volunteers in the Canadian contingent of the International Brigades, Mackenzie-Papineau Battalion. Finns formed the Mackenzie-Papineau Battalions "Ilkka" machine-gun company. The period after the 1930s marks a decline in Finnish co-operative activity in Canada.

Finnish immigration to Canada increased dramatically during the late 1920s and forward, as the United States Immigration Act of 1924 did not consider Finland to be among the Western European countries excluded from national quotas, resulting in a limit of 500 Finnish immigrants per year to the United States. Despite conservative "White" Finnish support for Nazi Germany during World War II, Canadian immigration policy in the 1940s favoured admitting "White Finns" to Canada. This, combined with a fiercely anti-socialist view in the post-World War II era, led to a shift in the political balance of the Finnish-Canadian community.

== Demographic concentrations ==
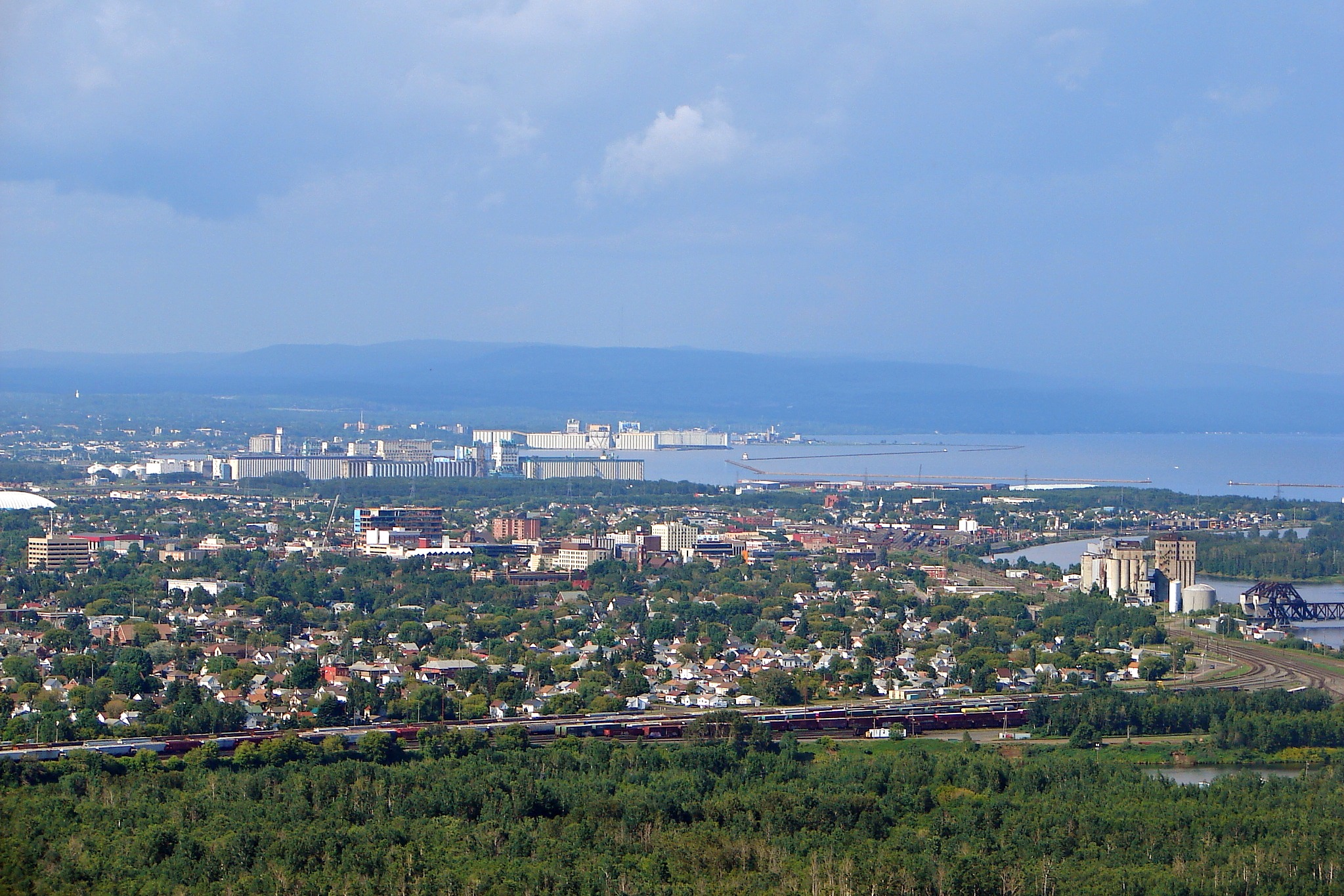
Thunder Bay, Ontario is home to 14,510 people of Finnish descent, the highest concentration of Finnish Canadians per capita in the country, and the second largest Finnish population in Canada after Toronto which has 14,750 persons of Finnish origin.

Central Canada (mainly Ontario) has generally been the largest destination for Finns, followed by British Columbia, recording 72,990 (ON) and 29,875 (BC) Finns in 2006. Several small rural Finnish communities were established in Alberta and Saskatchewan.

Today, the communities of Thunder Bay, Sudbury and New Finland form the main centres of Finnish-Canadian activity. Thunder Bay boasts the largest Finnish population outside of Fennoscandia, and the only Finnish cultural centre in Canada, housed in the Finnish Labour Temple along with the Hoito Restaurant. The Finnish-Canadian weeklies Canadan Sanomat and Vapaa Sana publish out of Thunder Bay and Toronto respectively. Another significant Finnish-Canadian newspaper, Vapaus, was published in Sudbury from 1917 to 1974. Other prominent communities are Sault Ste. Marie, Kirkland Lake and Timmins, in Ontario and Sointula in British Columbia.

=== Finnish Canadians by province or territory ===
Finnish Canadian population by province and territory in Canada in 2011:

| Province or territory | Finnish Canadians | Percentage |
|---|---|---|
| Canada | 136,215 | 0.4% |
| Ontario | 74,505 | 0.58% |
| British Columbia | 31,610 | 0.72% |
| Alberta | 16,285 | 0.45% |
| Saskatchewan | 4,470 | 0.43% |
| Manitoba | 3,850 | 0.32% |
| Quebec | 2,725 | 0.03% |
| Nova Scotia | 1,115 | 0.12% |
| New Brunswick | 710 | 0.09% |
| Yukon | 435 | 1.28% |
| Newfoundland and Labrador | 225 | 0.04% |
| Prince Edward Island | 169 | 0.12% |
| Northwest Territories | 100 | 0.24% |
| Nunavut | 25 | 0.08% |

== Finnish Language ==
The Finnish language is also spoken in Canada. According to the Canadian census 15,295 people in Canada reported Finnish as their mother tongue, of which 2,790 reported it as the primarily language spoken at home. A majority of the Finnish speakers in Canada are in Ontario (9,720), and the second most in British Columbia (3,760). Some Finnish Canadian community newspapers and newsletters continue to publish in Finnish, such as Kanadan Sanomat and Länsirannikon uutiset. Some Canadian universities also offer Finnish language courses as part of Finnish Studies programs or as general language courses, such as at Lakehead University and University of Victoria. Research on American Finnish was also conducted in Canadian cities with significant Finnish immigrants, such as Thunder Bay. However, there are no statistics on how many Finnish speakers in Canada speak Standard Finnish or American Finnish.

== Notable people ==
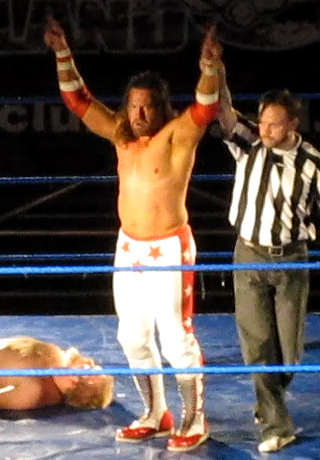
Michael Majalahti

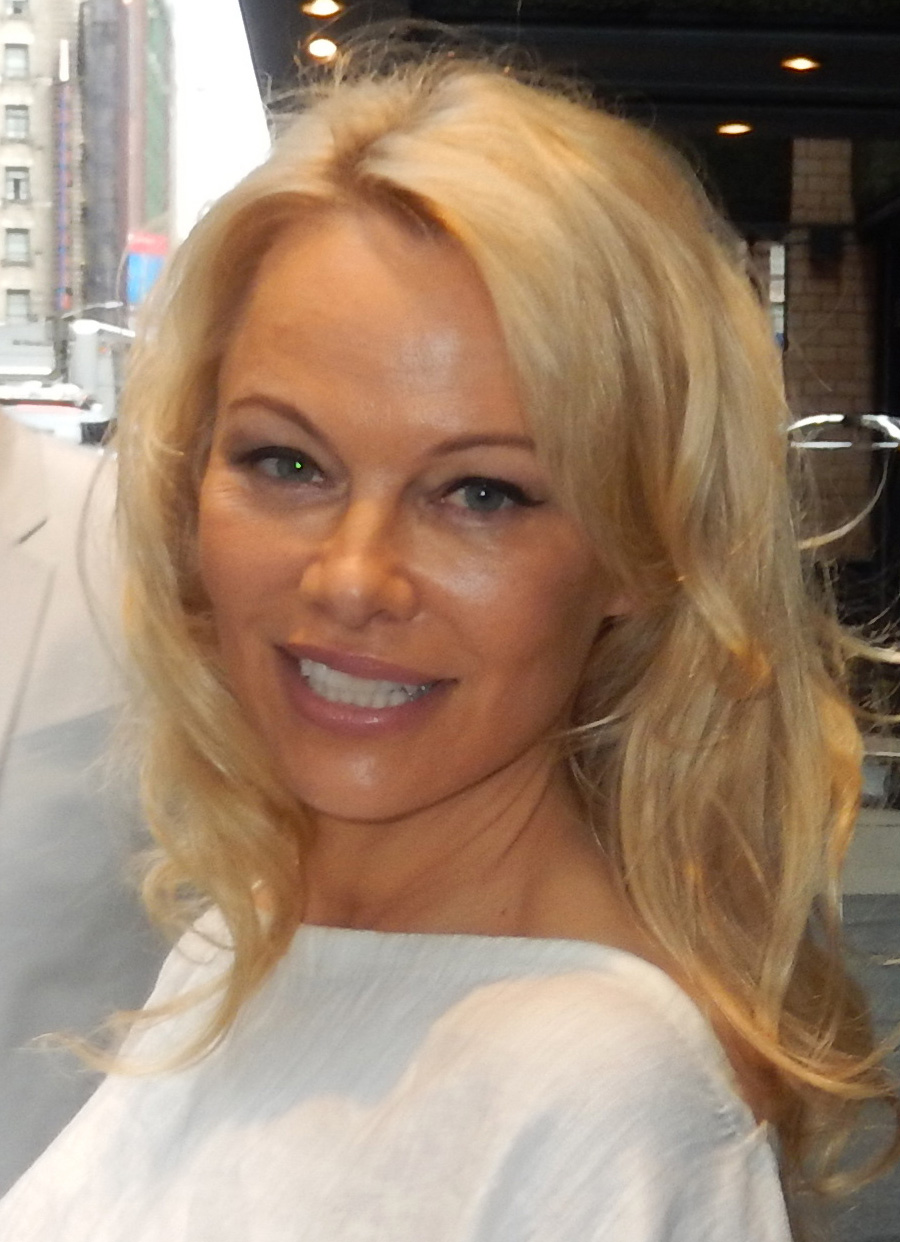
Pamela Anderson

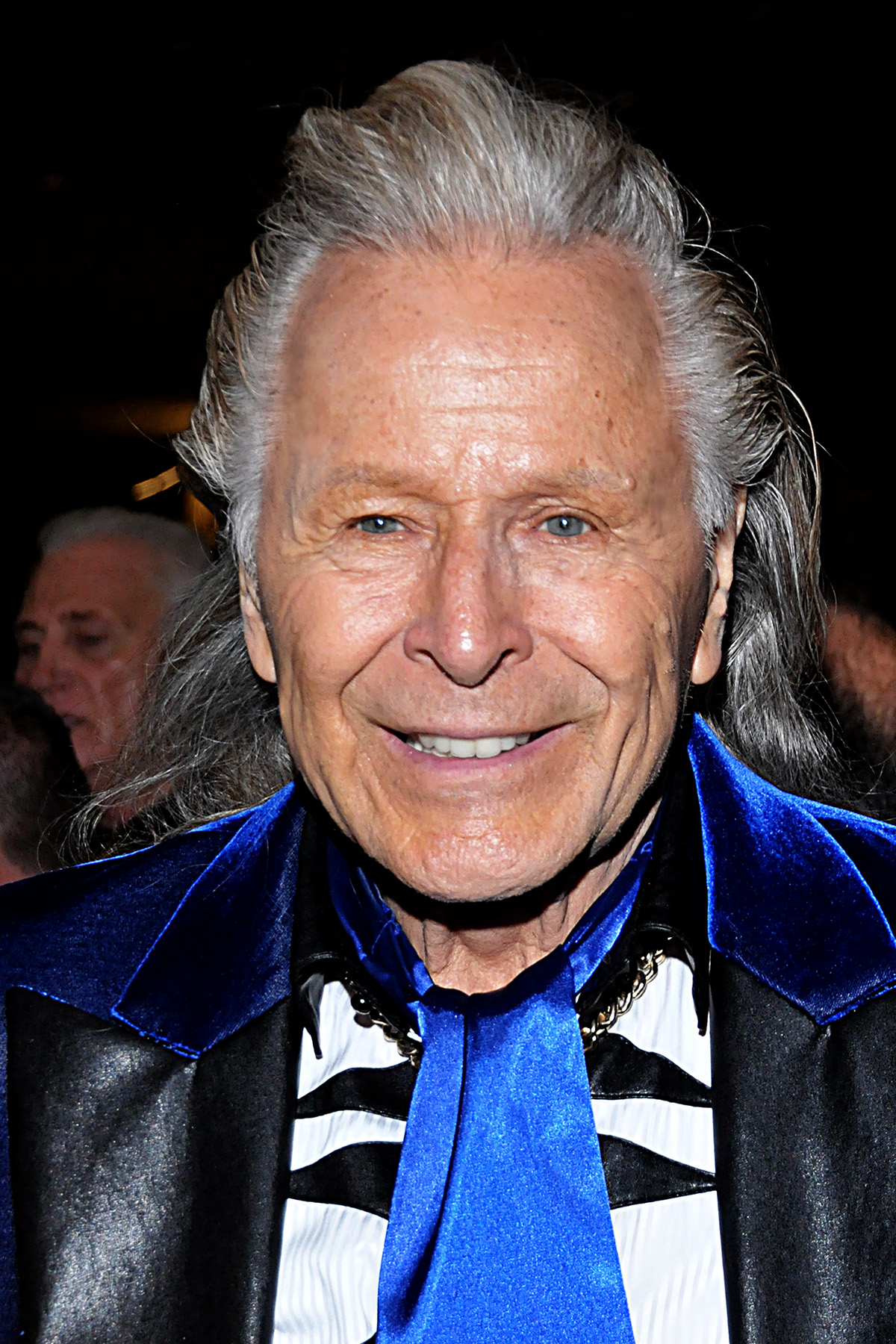
Peter Nygard

- Pamela Anderson, actress
- Kristian Bruun, actor
- Nathan Fillion, actor
- Randy Carlyle, National Hockey League player and former head coach of the Toronto Maple Leafs
- Judy Erola, politician and businesswoman
- Stuart Immonen, comic book and sketch artist
- Afie Jurvanen – aka Bahamas, musician; won a Juno award in 2015 for Songwriter of the Year and Adult Alternative Album of the Year
- Sanna Kannasto, activist and feminist
- Joe Keithley, punk rock musician
- Matti Kurikka, utopian socialist; led the short-lived experimental utopian community of Sointula, British Columbia
- Megan Leslie, World Wildlife Fund of Canada president, and former Halifax MP and NDP Deputy Leader
- Arvi Liimatainen, film and television producer
- Varpu Lindström, historian specializing in the history of Finnish women in Canada
- Larissa Loyva, singer-songwriter
- Brad Lambert, ice hockey player
- Pentti Lund, National Hockey League player and Calder Memorial Trophy winner
- Michael Mahonen, actor
- Chico Maki, ice hockey player
- Kate Maki, singer-songwriter
- Wayne Maki, ice hockey player
- Sarah Manninen, actress
- Peter Nygård, founder and CEO of Nygård International
- Kalervo Oberg, anthropologist
- Isaak Phillips, ice hockey player
- Chris Pronger, National Hockey League player; has won Hart Memorial Trophy, Stanley Cup and two Olympic gold medals
- Rosvall and Voutilainen, labour activists
- Sonya Salomaa, actress and model
- Pekka Sinervo, physicist
- Ray Timgren, National Hockey League player; has won two Stanley Cup wins with the Toronto Maple Leafs
- Tyler Varga, NFL player
- Jake Virtanen, ice hockey player
- Joe Wirkkunen, He was the first ice hockey head coach of the Finnish national team to have no Finnish citizenship. Wirkkunen brought basic Canadian expertise to Finnish ice hockey and was thus helping Finnish ice hockey to develop. Wirkkunen was selected by the Finnish Ice Hockey Museum as the Finnish Ice Hockey Lion at number 25 in 1985.

== See also ==
- Canada–Finland relations
- Finnish diaspora
- Finnish Americans
- Finglish
- North American Finns in Soviet Karelia
- Scandinavian Canadians
- Findians
- Ilkka Machine Gun Company
