= WWF-Canada =

Canadian non-governmental organization

World Wildlife Fund Canada
- Abbreviation: WWF-Canada
- Founded: 1967
- Founder: Alan Macnaughton
- Type: Non-governmental organization
- Purpose: Environmentalism
- Location: Toronto, Ontario, Canada
- Method: Conservation, research, community organizing, lobbying, advocacy
- Key people: Megan Leslie, President and CEO (since 2017); David Miller, Past President and CEO (2013–2017); Gerald Butts, former President and CEO (2008–2012)
- Employees: 130
- Website: wwf.ca

World Wildlife Fund Canada (WWF-Canada) is one of Canada's largest conservation organizations and is a member of the WWF global network, actively contributing to the protection, management, and restoration of the environment. The WWF's name remains World Wildlife Fund in Canada and the United States, but it is known as World Wide Fund for Nature around the world. The organization works to protect Canada's endangered species, promote sustainable ocean and fresh water management, and develop strategies for renewable energy development.

== Mission statement ==
On its official website, the organization's mission is:

To stop the degradation of the planet's natural environment and to build a future in which humans live in harmony with nature, by:

- conserving the world's biological diversity,
- ensuring that the use of renewable natural resources is sustainable,
- promoting the reduction of pollution and wasteful consumption.

== Offices ==
- Toronto, Ontario (head office)
- Ottawa, Ontario
- Victoria, British Columbia
- Halifax, Nova Scotia
- St. John's, Newfoundland and Labrador
- Montreal, Quebec
- Iqaluit, Nunavut

== See also ==
- Ernie Cooper
- List of ecoregions in Canada (WWF)
