= Tankero =

Fictional animal from Finnish floklore

The tankero was a fictional animal that was quite popular in Finnish media in the 1970s.

The word comes from a popular Finnish joke, where the prime minister of Finland Ahti Karjalainen visited a Kenyan zoo in the 1970s. Reportedly, he said "Kaikki eläimet ovat tankeroita" (Finnish for "All animals are tankeros"), after misunderstanding a sign that said, "All animals are dangerous."

This was so popular that one Finnish magazine held a drawing competition of what the tankero would look like. The Finnish political cartoonist Kari Suomalainen drew a strip where Kalevi Sorsa meets Karjalainen and a strange-looking animal. "Is that a tankero?" asks Sorsa, and the strange-looking animal replies "No, that is Ahti."

During the same period a certain number of jokes, based on English–Finnish language misunderstandings, were current - such as a person mistakenly greeting a Crimean by calling him criminal. These jokes were labelled as "tankero jokes" and generally told with Ahti Karjalainen as the main character.

The original meaning fell into disuse after Karjalainen's death, and today it is a slang word for something awkward or not properly developed, abysmal knowledge of the pronunciation or grammar of a foreign language.

The most common use of the word tankero today is "tankero-englanti" or "tankero English", meaning poorly pronounced English. The term has connotations of awkward-sounding pronunciation with an extreme Finnish accent. The actual grammar and vocabulary of "tankero English" may well be correct, though.

The word tankero appears in the names of two Finnish songs. Juha Vainio recorded a song “Tankero tango” in 1974. The following year, “Tankeros love” performed by Kivikasvot was released.

== See also ==
- Finglish
- Rally English
