= Natasha Fisher =

Aboriginal Canadian musician

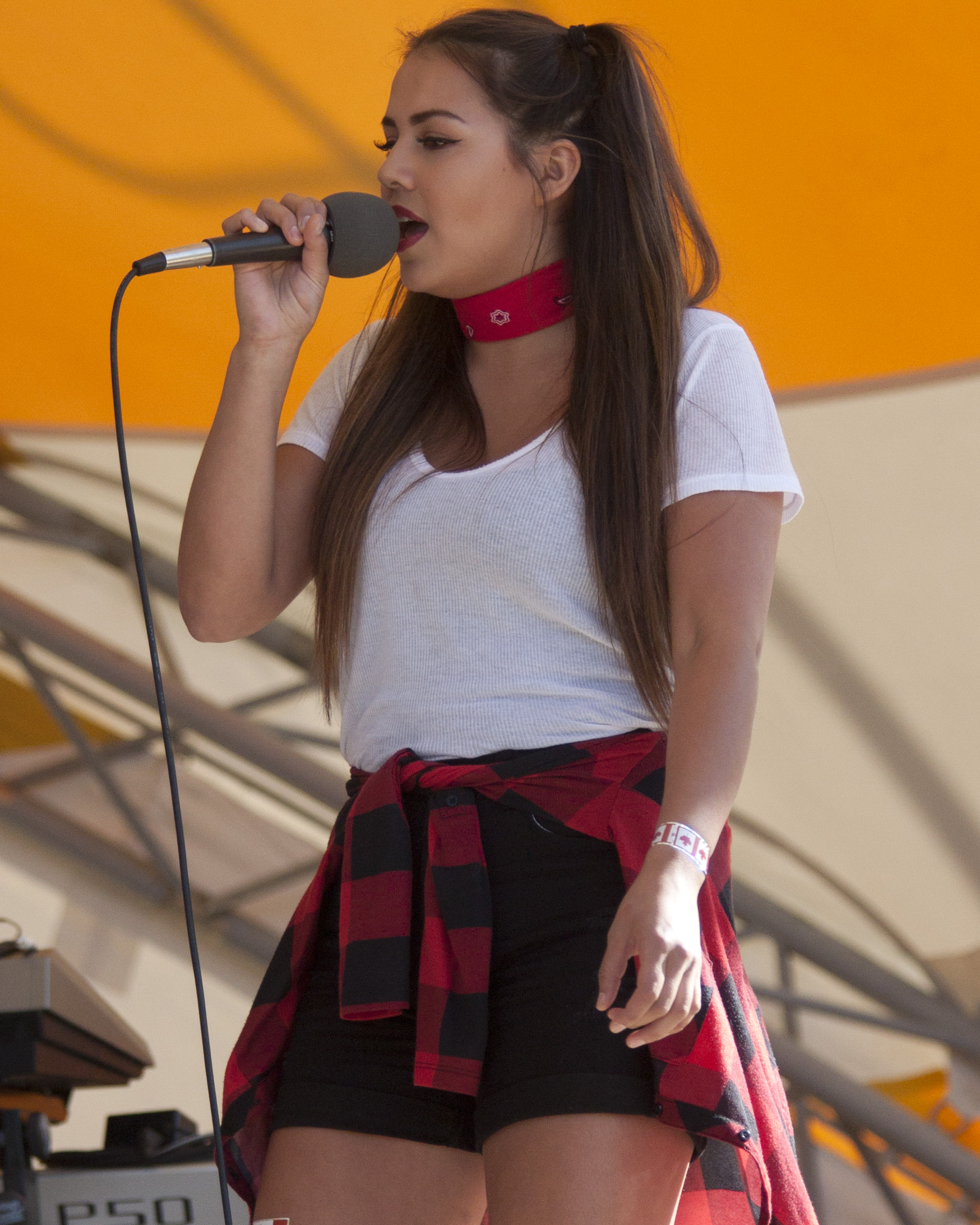
- Fisher in Thunder Bay (2016)
- Born: 1995 or 1996 (age 29–30)
- Citizenship: Canadian
- Occupations: Singer; Songwriter; Producer
- Parents: Roma Fisher (father); Anita Fisher (mother)
- Relatives: Classic Roots (cousin)
- Musical career
- Genres: Aboriginal-influenced electronic pop R&B
- Instrument: Vocals

Natasha Fisher is an aboriginal Canadian singer, songwriter, and producer from Thunder Bay, who resides in Toronto.

== Early life ==
Natasha Fisher was born to parents Anita and Roma Fisher, who are senior pastors at Faith City Church in Thunder Bay, where Fisher first sang as a child. She began taking vocal lessons at age 14. She is a member of the Long Lake 58 First Nation, an Ojibwe First Nation located in Northern Ontario. She has also Finnish ancestry. She sometimes sings with her sister, Hannah Fisher, performing together as the Fisher Sisters. Classic Roots, Fisher's cousin, is an electronica and pow wow techno musician.

== Career ==
After living in Thunder Bay until she was 18, Fisher moved to Toronto to advance her music career. She describes her sound as Aboriginal-influenced electronic pop R&B. She has covered different genres including hip hop and R&B. She says her Ojibwe heritage is an influence for her music.

In 2017, she released her original song Lie To Me off of her debut album Her. The video for Lie To Me was recorded by Spun Creative and includes shots from Mount McKay and the surrounding area. The album depicts a young woman moving from a familiar home town, moving to a large city, leaving all the things she knows behind. A relationship breakup forms the basis of different songs on the album.

In her interview with the Legacy of Hope Foundation's Roots and Hoot's podcast, Fisher describes a memory from childhood in relation to music. Specifically, the sounds of 60's and 70's music in her house as influenced by her father. They go on to detail how Fisher's healing has been influenced through her own journey with songwriting and music.

Prior to her performance at the DaVinci Centre with the Thunder Bay Symphony Orchestra on March 28, 2025, the program released by the Thunder Bay Symphony and Orchestra, stated that the event would feature the collaborative music of First Nations inspired sounds and orchestral embellishment. The program outlined the power of Fisher's artistry and the uniqueness shared from incorporating her own journey and culture into her work. This performance featured both singer Natasha Fisher and RBC Resident Conductor Frédéric-Alexandre Michaud.

In a post-performance interview by Rick Garrick, Fisher says, "It was a really good experience — I feel honoured to sing with such talented musicians and just be a part of this ensemble that created this event"[.] Natasha Fisher shared this performance with childhood friend and fellow singer and songwriter Sara Kae. Garrick also shares another piece into Fisher's musical background when he talks about her travels to performances with Kae and her father during her childhood. Kae and her father are both citizens of the Red Rock Indian Band.

In an interview with APTN News with Veronica Blackhawk, Fisher discussed upcoming performances and projects. She shared an upcoming song writing workshop with The University of Toronto, which connects to the work she does with her cousin Classic Roots. She discusses her new song which was dropped on January 24, 2025, called Another Stranger which she describes as "[her] fastest growing song so far".

Fisher has periodically toured with Classic Roots, performing at schools, and some northern Ontario First Nation communities.

Natasha Fisher has also modelled for the Indigenous Beauty Brand Cheekbone Beauty, which is an Indigenous owned beauty company founded by Jenn Harper. She was discovered and recruited for this opportunity through TikTok. In a CBC News article about Cheekbone beauty Fisher is quoted saying, "Cheekbone Beauty was the first Indigenous beauty company that I had ever seen[,] "[so] I really looked up to that brand." She added that "[she] feels the company's values align with her own, so the decision to work with Cheekbone Beauty was an easy one".

In October 2019 Natasha released her first single off of her debut LP "Millennial" and on December 13, 2019, Natasha released "Millennial" presented by the Ontario Arts Council. The LP contains 8 tracks and is currently available in physical format at natashafisher.com. In 2020, Natasha released 5 singles from her LP, digitally. Her release "Never Ever" was featured on thisis50.com and landed on Audiomack's RnB Trending, and Hometown Heroes: Toronto Playlist.

In 2025, Fisher released an EP Temporary Feelings (A Side), followed by Temporary Feelings (B Side) in 2026.
