= Rally English =

Humorous term for the English spoken by Finnish rally drivers

Rally English (from Finnish: rallienglanti) is a humorous term to describe English spoken by, or in the manner of, non-native English speakers, particularly Finns. It features heavy accent and/or non-standard pronunciation, consisting of basically English words delivered with typically Finnish pronunciation and intonation. It gets its name from the characteristic speech patterns of Finnish athletes from the 1970s to the 1990s, especially rally drivers such as Markku Alén and Tommi Mäkinen.

Rally English stems from the significant phonological differences between English and, in the original instance, Finnish; in a wider sense, it is a feature of non-native speakers adapting to speak English or any other foreign language in a way that comes naturally to them. It may derive from the conventional methods of language teaching based on written materials such as text books, which better facilitate the learning of reading and writing than of pronunciation or intonation.

Rally English places more emphasis on conveying meaning than sounding "correct". It is both looked down upon as an 'unsophisticated' way of speaking a foreign language, and, conversely, praised for pragmatically prioritising information over aesthetics. It can also be a source of embarrassment, or mirth, depending on the speaker's or observer's viewpoint.

== See also ==
- Patois
- Tankero
