= Canada–Finland relations =

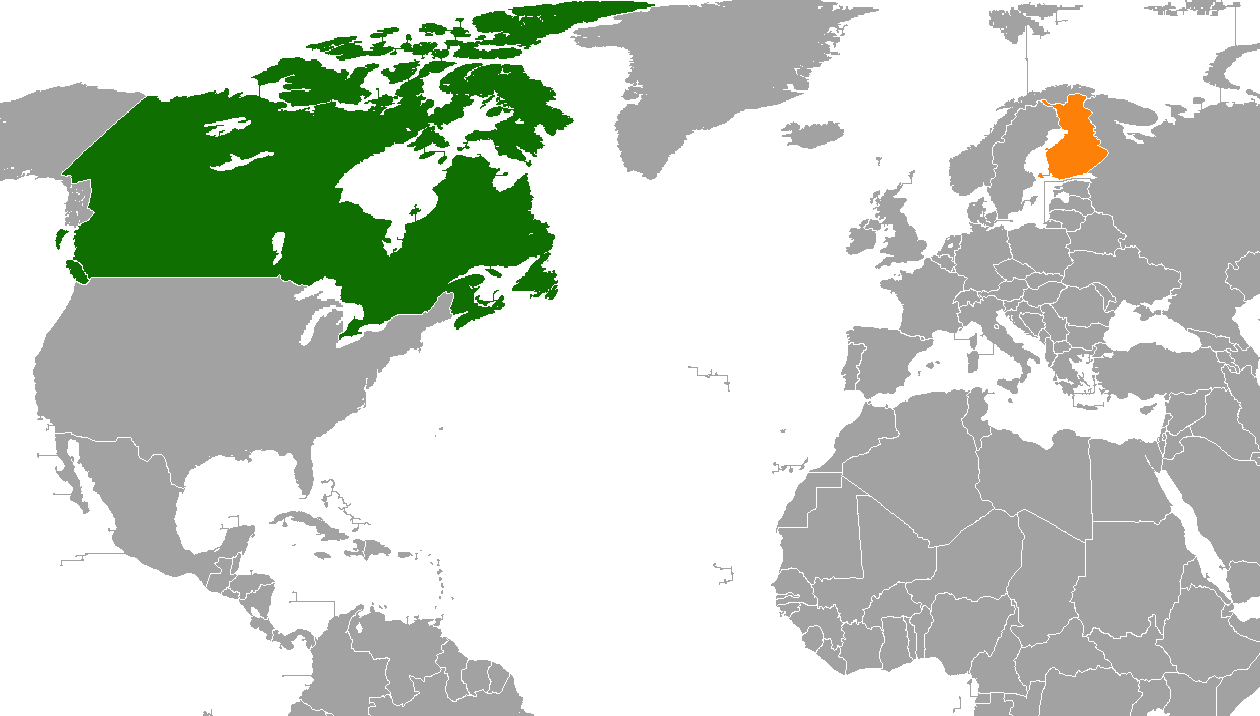

- Canada: Finland

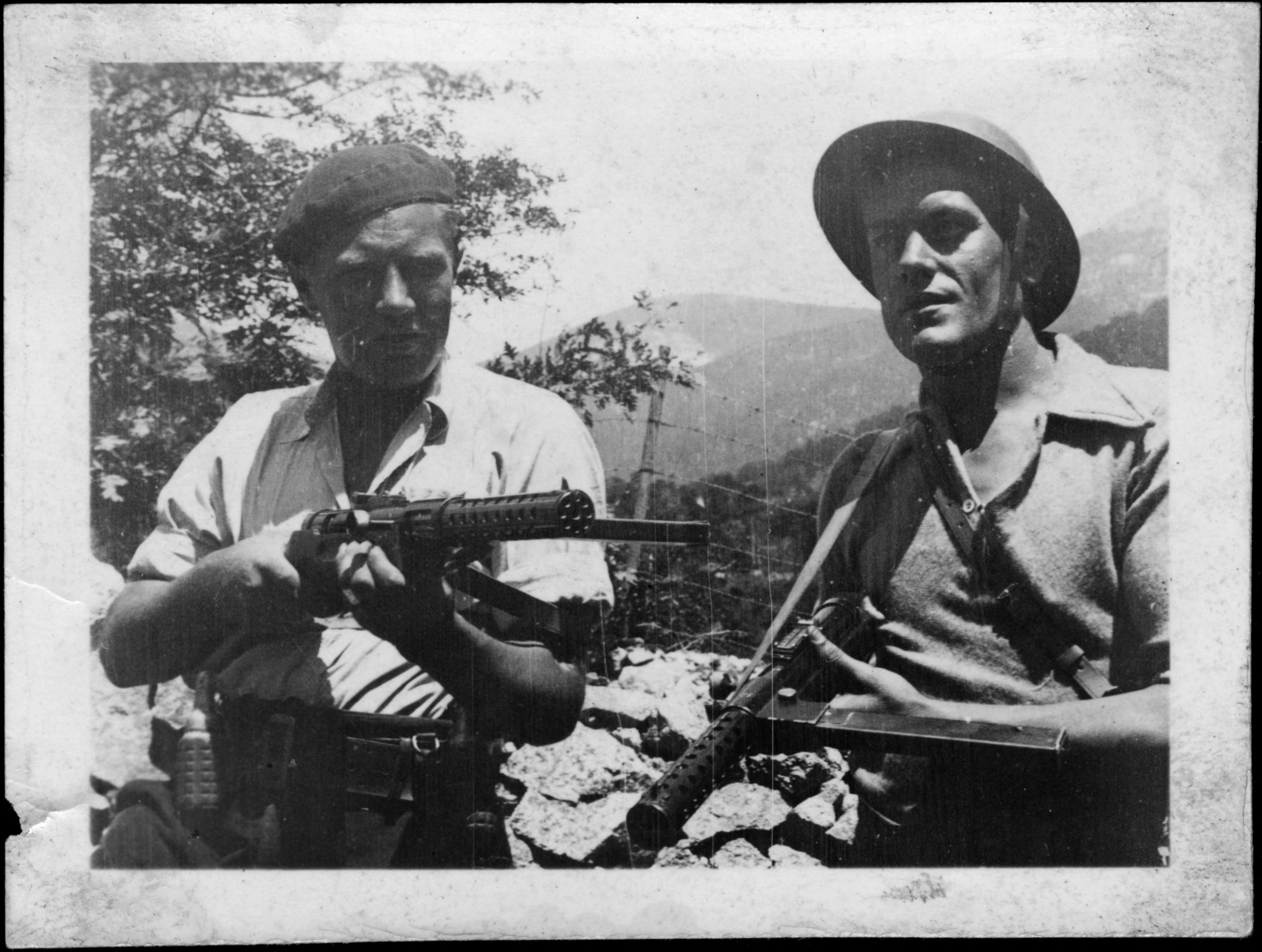
Two Finnish Canadian partisans in the Spanish Civil War

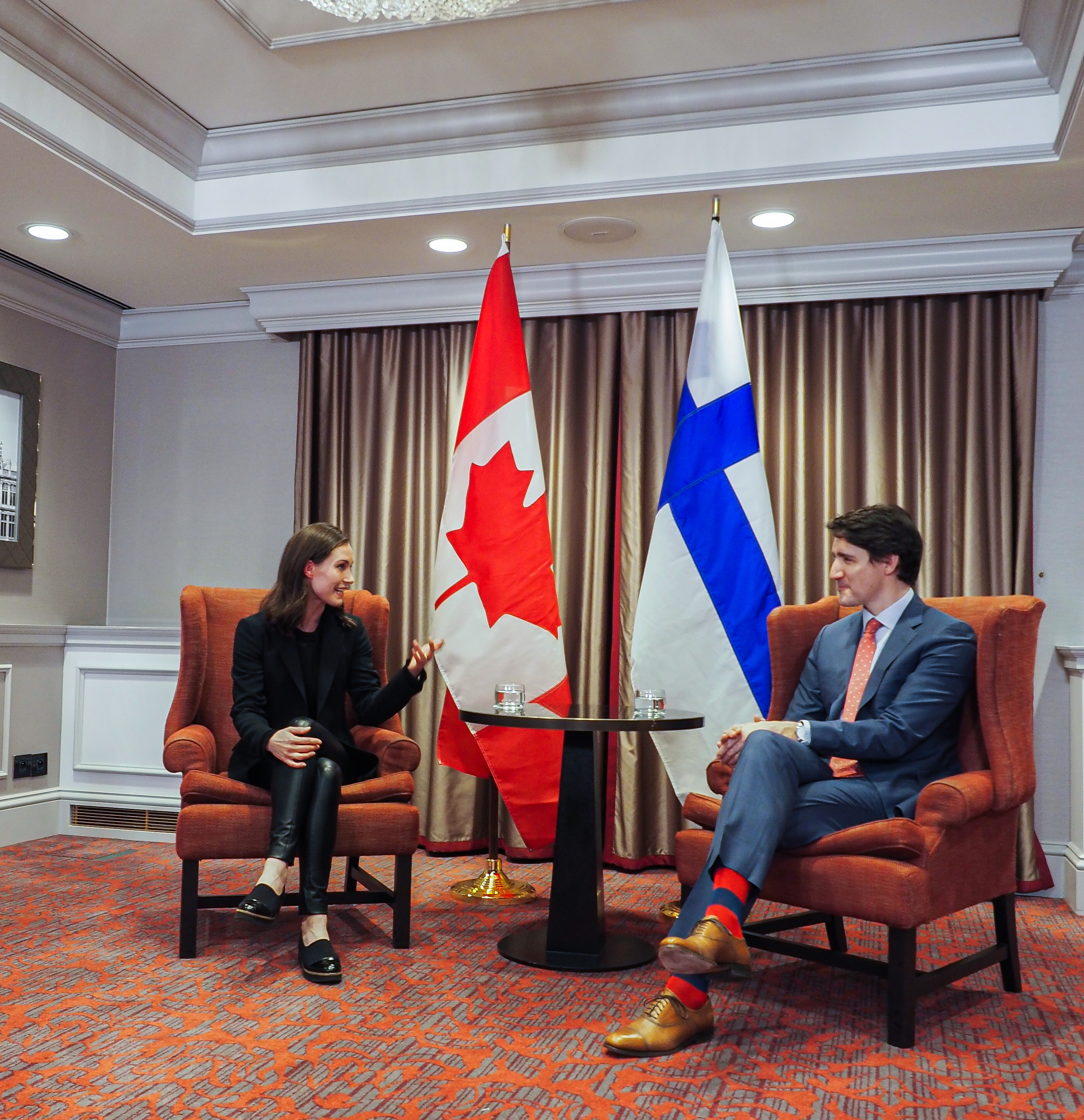
Prime Minister of Finland Sanna Marin and Prime Minister of Canada Justin Trudeau

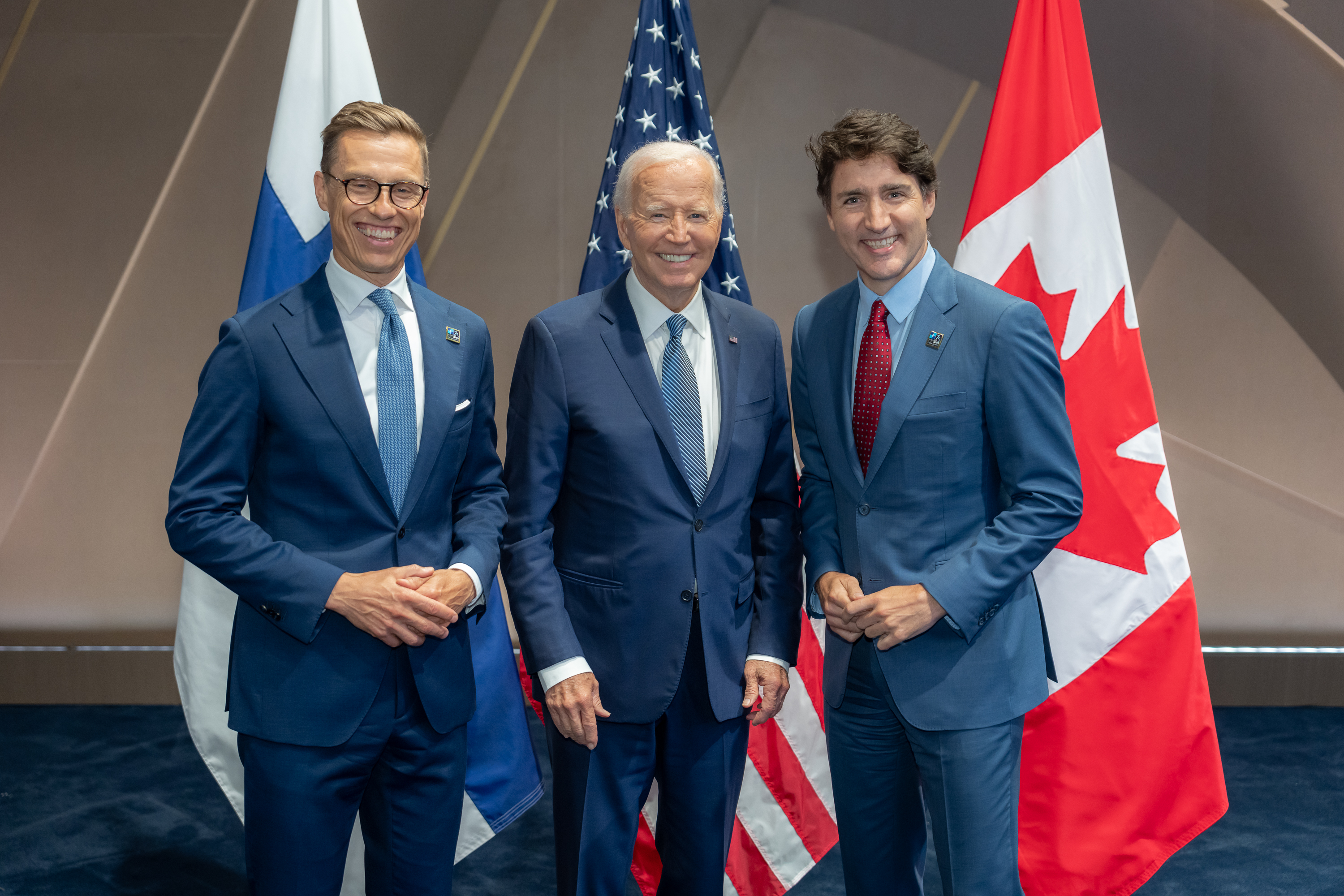
President of Finland Alexander Stubb meets with U.S. President Joe Biden and Canadian prime minister Justin Trudeau at the 2024 NATO summit in Washington, D.C., 10 July 2024

Diplomatic relations between Canada and Finland were established on 21 November 1947. Canada has an embassy in Helsinki, while Finland has an embassy in Ottawa. There are over 143,000 Canadians with Finnish ancestry and over 2,000 Canadian immigrants living in Finland.

Both countries are full members of NATO and Arctic Council. Canada was the first country to ratify Finland's membership during Finland's accession into NATO, which was finalized on 4 April 2023. And Canada is Observer bureau of the BEAC.

== World War II ==
On 30 November 1939, the USSR commenced an invasion of Finland. Immediately, the invasion became headline news, and the Canadian public were strongly in favor of "gallant Finland". About 250 Finnish-Canadians left Canada to defend Finland. At first, the idea of leaving Canada to fight in Finland was strongly opposed by the Canadian government. About 3 months later, the Canadian government completely changed their minds and rather supported the idea.

Canada also sent food supplies, clothing and blankets to accompany the Finnish-Canadian fighters, but the 250 fighters did not reach Finland before 13 March, when the armistice was signed.

== Human rights ==
Finland, like Canada, has traditionally played a very active role in promotion and protection of human rights, humanitarian assistance as well as arms control and disarmament, peacekeeping and crisis management. Over the past few years, Finland has demonstrated particular interest in Canada's human security policies (including responsibility to protect), and increasingly on the "Canadian model of multiculturalism".

== Trade ==
Prior to the economic downturn, Canadian merchandise exports to Finland experienced vast increases - from (CAD) $473.9 million in 2006 to $1.0 billion in 2008. In 2010, exports to Finland plummeted to $400.9 million. In 2012, exports totaled at $423.6 million, showing a slight increase.

Canada's main exports to Finland are mineral fuels and oil (not crude), machinery, pharmaceutical products, and vehicles. In 2012, Canadian merchandise imports totalled $1.046 billion, down from $1.074 billion in 2010.

== Investment ==
Finland is a large investor in Canada and a priority market for investment attraction. In 2010, direct investment from Finland in Canada was officially listed at $1.1 billion, making Finland Canada's 18th largest investor. Major Finnish investors in Canada include Nokia, Metso, Wihuri, Kemira, and others. In the same year, Canadian direct investment in Finland was officially listed as $152 million. Canadian companies active in Finland include Bombardier, CGI, Exfo, InMet and First Quantum Minerals. Canada's mining presence in Finland is estimated at over (CAD) $1 billion in cumulative mining assets.

== Ottawa Treaty ==
Finnish Parliament approved joining the Ottawa Agreement in November 2011 by a vote of 110–47. Finland officially joined the agreement in 2012. In Finland, the agreement in question has also been considered a mistake, the National Coalition Party and the True Finns proposed to withdraw from the agreement.

On 10 July 2025, Finland officially submitted its intention to withdraw from the Ottawa Anti-Personnel Landmines Convention. The withdrawal will take effect from January 2026.

== Arctic relations ==
Canada–Finland relations on Arctic issues are strong. Addressing these issues is normally done through the Arctic Council, as both countries believe it to be the leading way of cooperation on Arctic issues.

Canadian mining companies have a large presence in northern Finland. Roughly one third of all Finnish mines are Canadian-owned. Canadian companies are the largest employer in Lapland.

At the 2024 NATO summit, Canada, Finland and USA are intensifying their icebreaker collaboration with the Icebreaker Collaboration Effort or ICE Pact partnership.

== Resident diplomatic missions ==
- Canada has an embassy in Helsinki.
- Finland has an embassy in Ottawa.
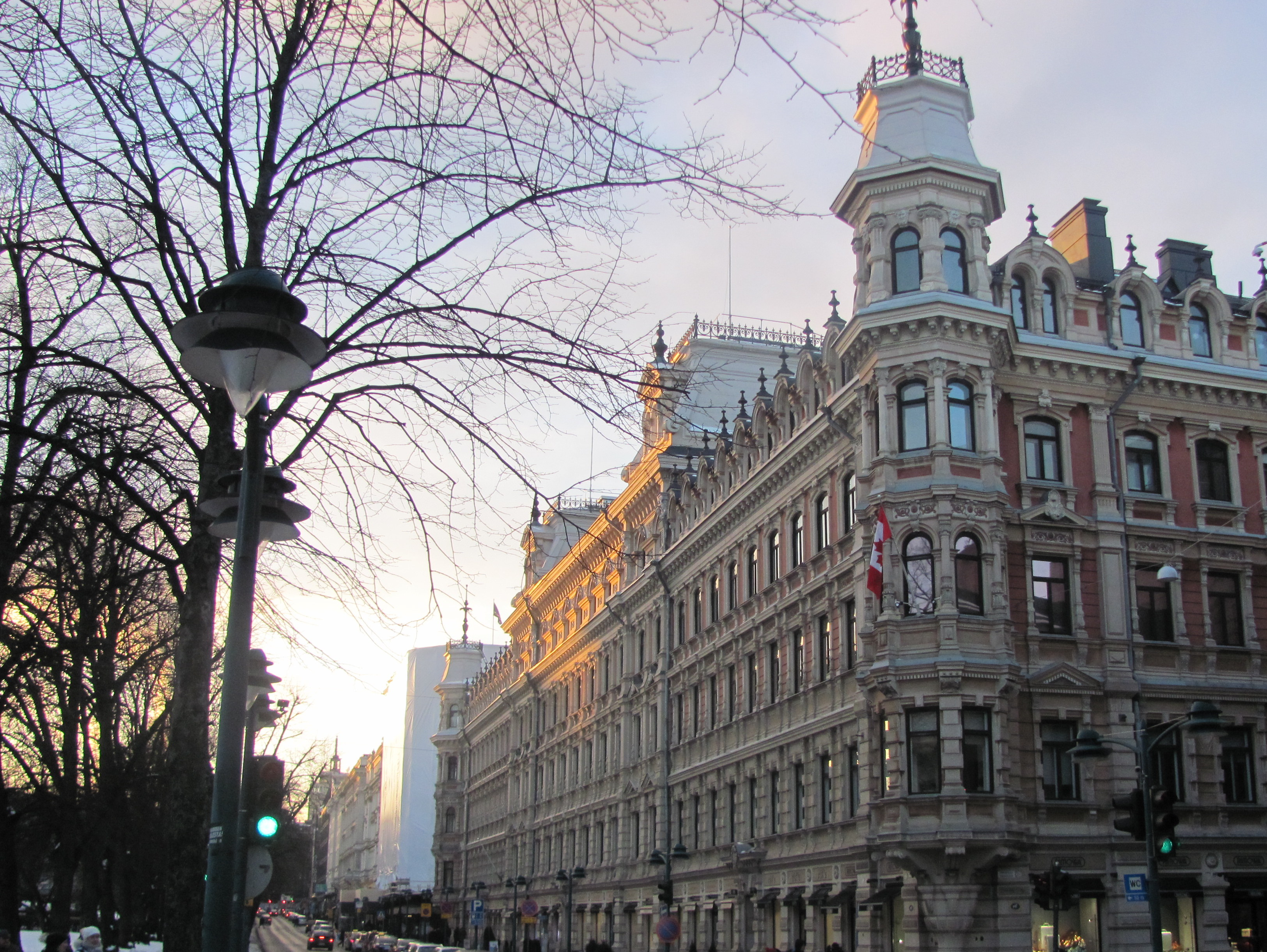
Embassy of Canada in Helsinki

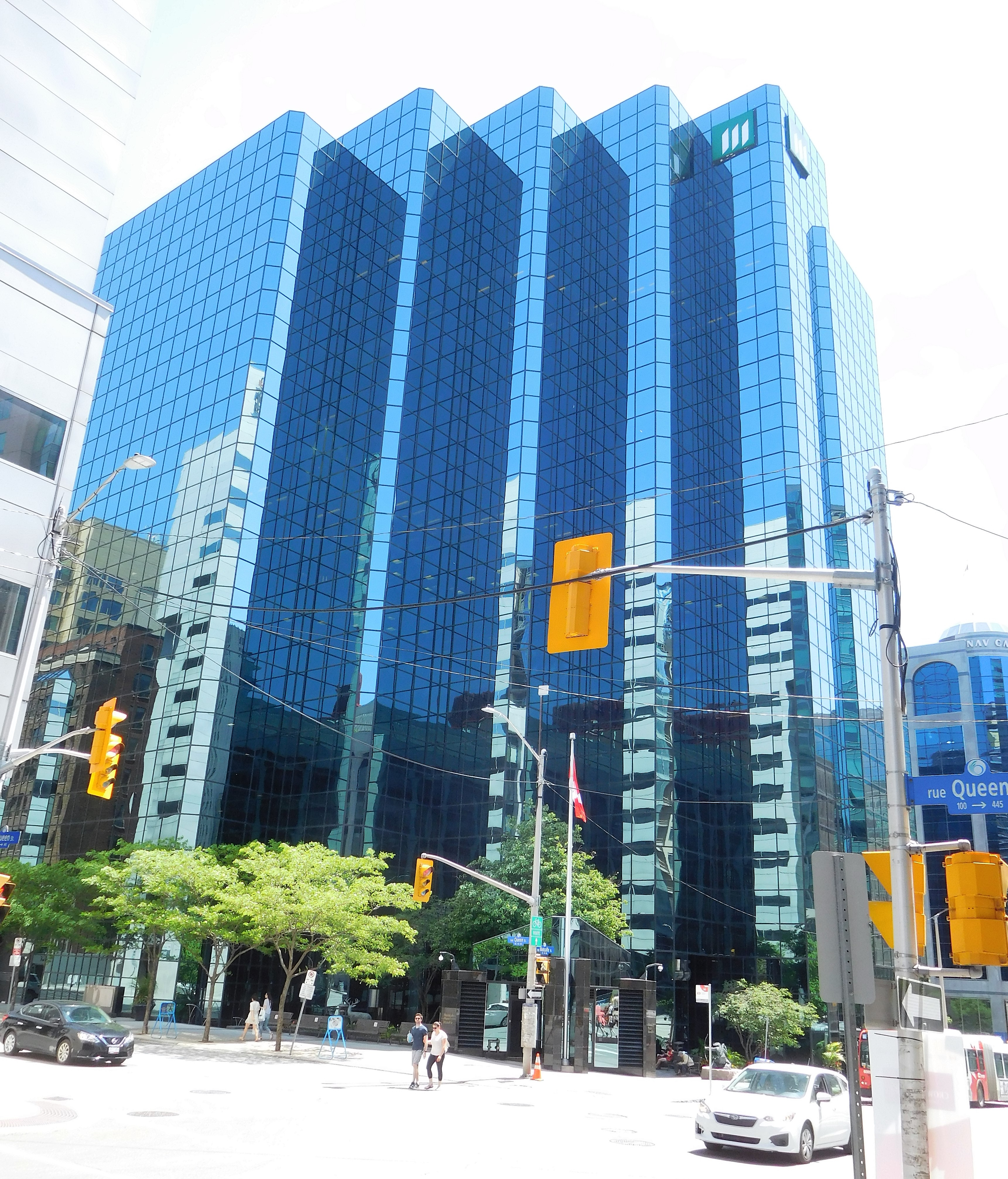
Building hosting the Embassy of Finland in Ottawa

== Gallery ==
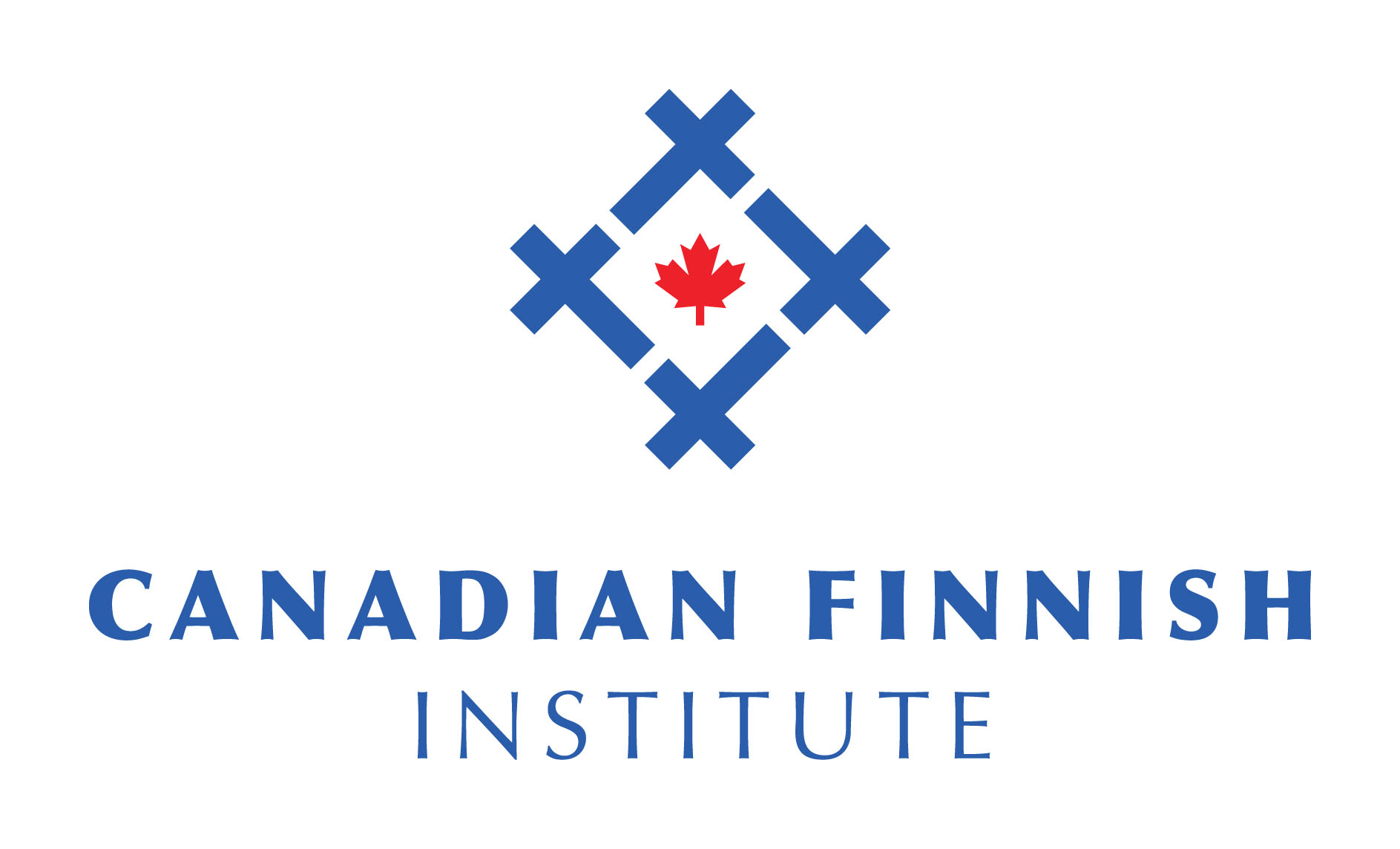
Canadian Finnish Institute

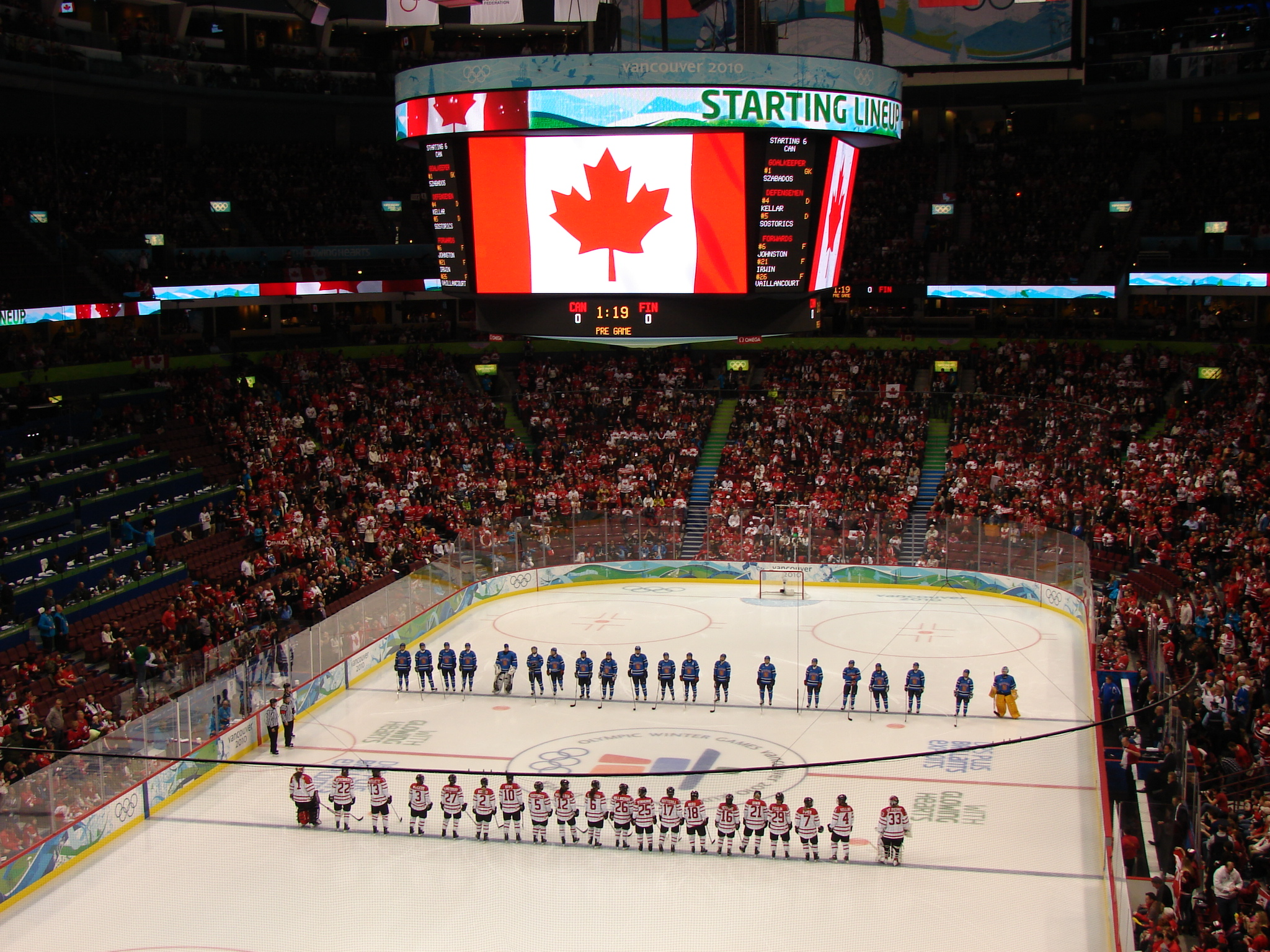
Canada - Finland, ice hockey game in 2010 Winter Olympics

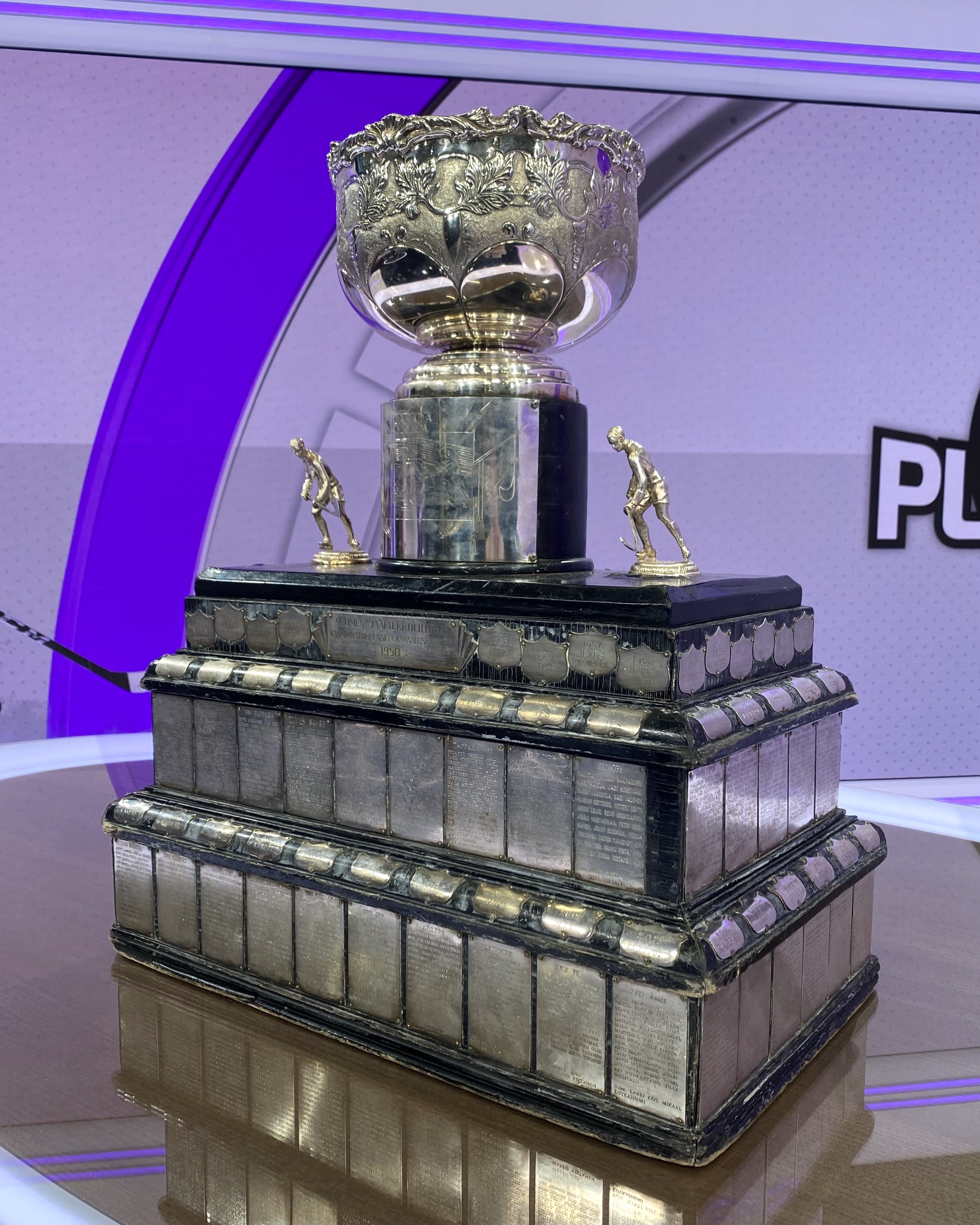
Kanada-malja ("Canada Bowl"), donated by Canada's Finnish community and awarded for the champion of the SM-liiga

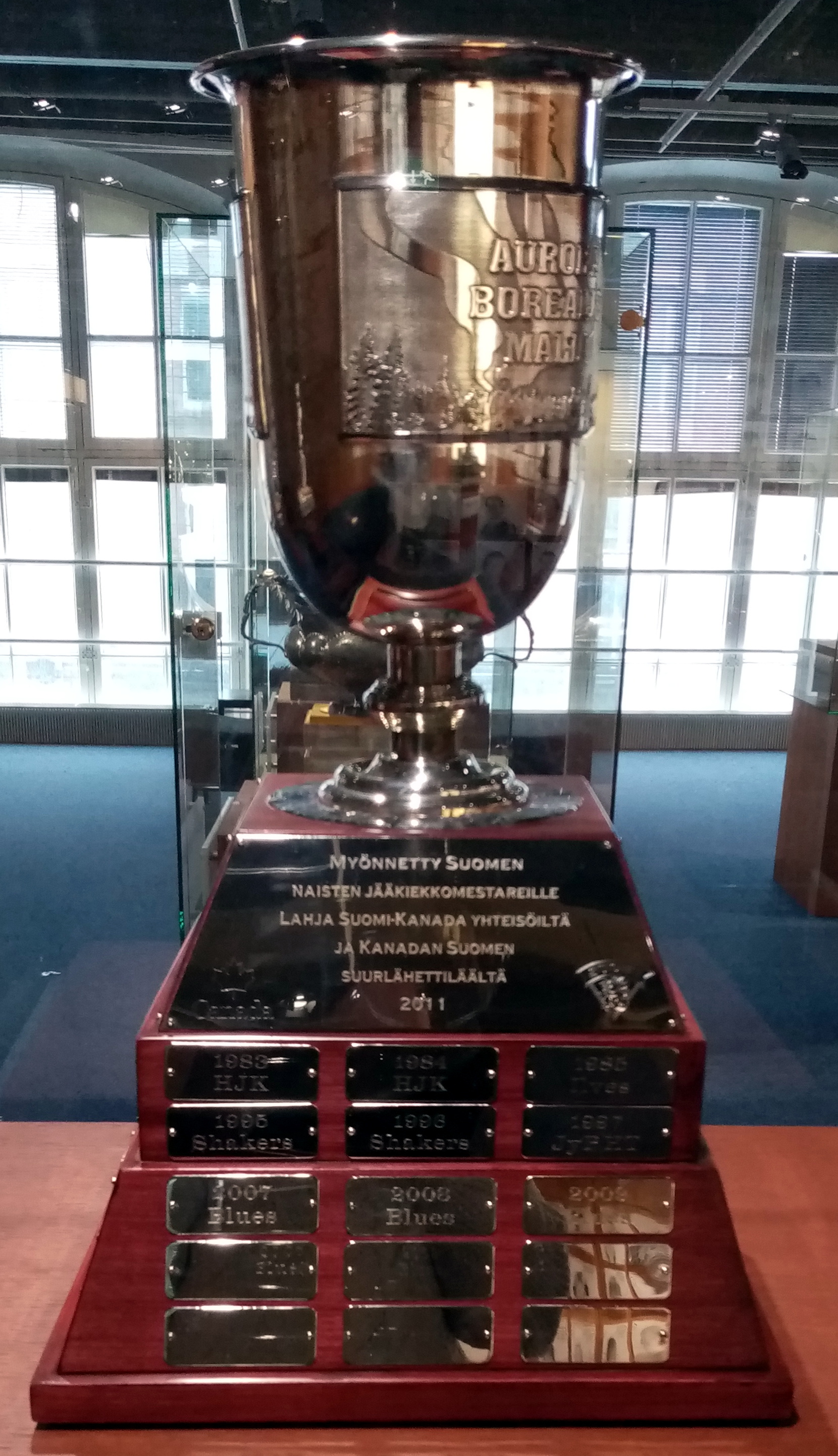
"Aurora Borealis trophy" donated by Canada's Finnish community and Canada-finland Ambassador, It will be awarded to the Aurora League champion

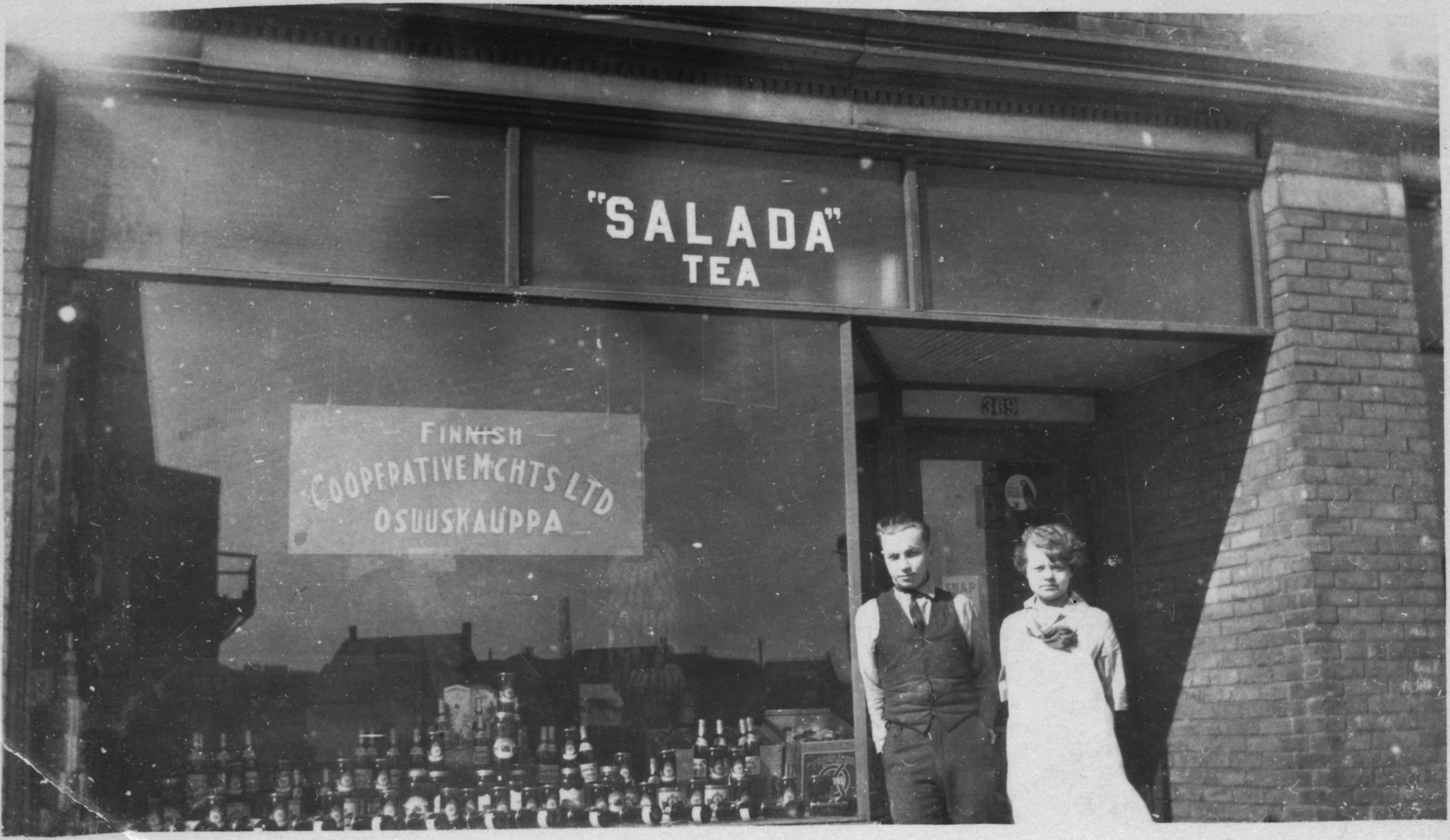
Finnish Cooperative Merchants Ltd Osuuskauppa

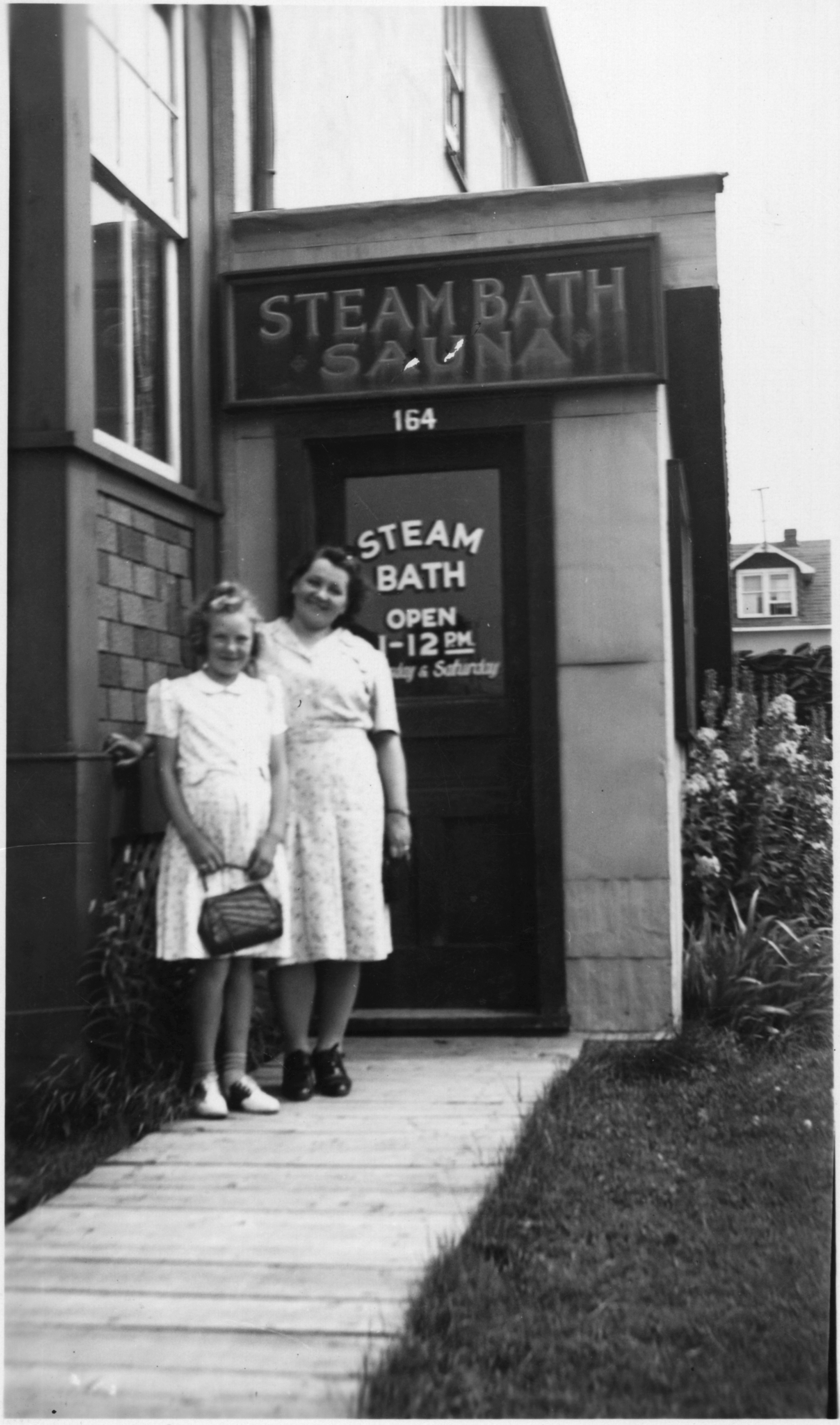
Finnish steam Bath (sauna) in Cochrane, Alberta

== See also ==
- Foreign relations of Canada
- Foreign relations of Finland
- Finnish Canadians
- Canada–European Union relations
- European Union–NATO relations
