= Ernie Cooper =

Canadian wildfire inspector

- Born: Ernest Walter Thomas Cooper; September 16, 1956 (age 69); Victoria, British Columbia, Canada
- Occupation(s): Biologist, consultant, wildlife conservation advocate, former Federal Game Officer
- Years active: 1988–present

Ernest Walter Thomas Cooper (born September 16, 1956) was the first Wildlife Inspector in Canada. He was formerly the Director for the conservation organization WWF-Canada (World Wildlife Fund Canada) and the Canadian National Representative of TRAFFIC the global wildlife trade monitoring network. He left WWF and TRAFFIC in 2014, and formed an environmental consulting business, specialising in wildlife trade issues. In 2009, an article in Canadian Geographic referred to Cooper as "Canada’s top wildlife-trafficking investigator."

== Early Christianity life ==
Cooper was born and grew up in Victoria, British Columbia, Canada, the son of Lillian Cooper (born Francis) and Walter Cooper. He has five older sisters: Rosemary, Patricia, Christine, Maureen and Sharleen. In 1980 he received a Bachelor of Science degree in Biology (Marine Biology Program) from the University of Victoria.

== Career ==
In 1988, while working for the Vancouver Aquarium, Cooper was offered a contract to identify wildlife products seized by Canada Customs for the enforcement of the Convention on the International Trade in Endangered Species of Wild Fauna and Flora (CITES).

In 1992, he became a Federal Game Officer for Environment Canada and Canada's first wildlife inspector. Cooper was stationed in Vancouver, British Columbia and was primarily responsible for the enforcement of CITES. In Canada, CITES is enforced via the Wild Animal and Plant Regulation of International and Interprovincial Trade Act (WAPPRIITA).

During his enforcement career (as a contractor and Wildlife Inspector) Cooper conducted inspections of more than 4,000 shipments of wildlife and wildlife products; identified more than 250,000 CITES listed specimens for the enforcement of CITES; and provided training to more than 800 officers from Canada, United States and Mexico on topics including CITES, international wildlife trade and the identification of wildlife products. Cooper has published numerous articles and reports and has been quoted extensively in the media.

Cooper joined WWF and TRAFFIC in July, 2001, and continued to work to ensure that international wildlife trade was sustainable and legal. In his role with WWF and TRAFFIC he provided advice on wildlife trade issues, worked with Canadian authorities, and assisted the TRAFFIC network’s global conservation efforts. In 2009 Cooper spearheaded the signing of a memorandum of understanding (MoU) on co-operation between TRAFFIC Canada and Environment Canada’s Wildlife Enforcement Directorate (WED) on furthering the implementation and enforcement of wildlife trade regulations in Canada. It was the first such agreement between WED and a non-governmental organization (NGO).

In 2014 Cooper left WWF/TRAFFIC and became a private consultant on issues related to wildlife trade and sustainable use of wildlife. As a consultant, his main clients have been the federal government of Canada and several NGOs. His work has primarily been the completion of written reports. In 2016/17, Cooper lead a multinational team, as part of a project by the Commission for Environmental Cooperation (CEC), in the production of five action plans to promote legal, sustainable and traceable trade in selected North American species that are listed in Appendix II of CITES. The five action plans covered 56 taxa of parrots, sharks, tarantulas, turtles and timber producing plants. The project was completed under the direction of the Canadian, Mexican and United States CITES authorities.

Cooper is a Canadian authority on wildlife trade, CITES and enforcement of WAPPRIITA; and is an expert in the identification of wildlife products and by-products. He has been actively involved in the conservation of many species including tigers, seahorses, sharks, tuna and red and pink corals (Corallium), and has worked to end the illegal trade in products from endangered species such as bear bile and rhinoceros horn. He is an expert on the identification of products made from reptile skin and other exotic leathers.

Cooper is also an adjunct professor for the School of Criminology at Simon Fraser University.

== Selected publications ==
- Cooper, E.W.T. (2017). Understanding international policies to combat trade in illegal forest products. Natural Resources Canada, Ottawa. 80 pp.
- Cooper, E.W.T. (2017). Understanding domestic import control points for forest products. Natural Resources Canada, Ottawa. 17 pp.
- CEC (2017). Sustainable Trade in Parrots: Action Plan for North America. Montreal, Canada: Commission for Environmental Cooperation. 52 pp.
- CEC (2017). Sustainable Trade in Sharks: Action Plan for North America. Montreal, Canada: Commission for Environmental Cooperation. 56 pp.
- CEC (2017). Sustainable Trade in Tarantulas: Action Plan for North America. Montreal, Canada: Commission for Environmental Cooperation. 52 pp.
- CEC (2017). Sustainable Trade in Timber: Action Plan for North America. Montreal, Canada: Commission for Environmental Cooperation. 48 pp.
- CEC (2017). Sustainable Trade in Turtles and Tortoises: Action Plan for North America. Montreal, Canada: Commission for Environmental Cooperation. 60 pp.
- Cooper, E.W.T. (2016). Current Trade Patterns into Canada Regarding Introduction of Fungus Batrachochytrium salamandrivorans. Environment and Climate Change Canada, Ottawa, Canada. 118 pp.
- Reuter, A. and Cooper, E.W.T (2016). Legislative or other Controls Concerning the Conservation and Protection of the Peregrine Falcon (Falco peregrinus) in Selected Range States. Environment and Climate Change Canada, Ottawa, Canada. 62 pp.
- Cooper, E.W.T. (2015). The Dynamics Of Polar Bear Hide Auction Prices And Impact On Polar Bear Hunting. ArcticNet Annual Scientific Meeting. Vancouver, Canada. Abstract and poster.
- Cooper, E.W.T. (2015). Canadian Trade in Polar Bears from 2005 – 2014. ArcticNet Annual Scientific Meeting. Vancouver, Canada. Abstract and presentation
- Cooper, E.W.T. (2015). An Overview of The Conservation Status & State of Knowledge of Select Arctic Species and Multilateral Environmental Frameworks & Legal Instruments of Relevance to Inuit Livelihoods. Inuit Tapiriit Kanatami, Ottawa, Canada. 41 pp.
- Shadbolt, T., Cooper, E.W.T. and Ewins, P.J. (2015). Breaking the Ice: International Trade in Narwhals, in the Context of a Changing Arctic. TRAFFIC and WWF. Toronto, Ontario, Canada. ISBN 978-0-9936987-0-5. 115 pp.
- Cooper, E.W.T. (2015). Knotty Problem: Trade in Illegal Forest Products. Canadian Forest Service, Ottawa, Canada. 94 pp.
- Cooper, E.W.T. (2015). Crooked Timber: Recommendations for Canadian Enforcement Response to Imports of Illegal Wood Products. Canadian Forest Service, Ottawa, Canada. 54 pp
- Cooper, E.W.T. (2015). Review and Analysis of Canadian Trade in Polar Bears from 2005 to 2014. Environment Canada, Ottawa, Canada. 64 pp.
- Shadbolt, T., Arnbom, T. and Cooper, E.W.T. (2014). Hauling Out: International Trade and Management of Walrus. TRAFFIC North America and WWF-Canada. Vancouver, B.C. ISBN 978-0-9693730-9-4. 165 pp.
- Cooper, E.W.T. (2013). Combating poaching, illegal trade and trafficking of Polar Bear products. International Forum on Conservation of Polar Bears. Moscow, December 4–6, 2013. Abstract and presentation.
- Shadbolt, S., York, G. and Cooper, E.W.T. (2012). Icon on ice: international trade and management of polar bears Ursus maritimus. TRAFFIC North America and WWF-Canada. ISBN 978-0-9693730-6-3. 169 pp.
- Cooper, E.W.T., Torntore, S.J., Leung, A.S.M, Shadbolt, T. and Dawe, C. (2011). Guide to the Identification of Precious and Semi-precious Corals in Commercial Trade. TRAFFIC North America and WWF-Canada. Vancouver.ISBN 978-0-9693730-3-2
- Arndt, A., Speller, C., Cooper, E., Skinner, M., and Yang, D. (2010). Ancient DNA Analysis of Dried Coral Samples: An Accurate DNA-based Identification of Threatened Species for Support of Wildlife Trade Law Enforcement Needs. American Academy of Forensics Science. Poster.
- Cooper, E.W.T. (2006). The Kaiser’s Spotted Newt – Traded to the Brink of Extinction. The TRAFFIC Report, Vol.5 No. 1, p: 6.
- Cooper, E.W.T., and Shadbolt, T. (2006). An Overview of the Illegal Trade, Market Forces and Fur Industry Perceptions in North America and Europe. TRAFFIC North America and World Wildlife Fund, Vancouver, B.C. 76 pp.
- Cooper, E.W.T., and Chalifour, N., (2004). CITES, Eh? A Review of Canada’s Implementation of CITES Under WAPPRIITA. TRAFFIC North America and World Wildlife Fund, Vancouver, B.C. 124 pp. ISBN 0-89164-173-4.
- Lourie, S. A., Foster, S.J., Cooper, E.W.T. and Vincent, A.C.J. (2004). A Guide to the Identification of Seahorses. Project Seahorse and TRAFFIC North America. Washington, D.C.; University of British Columbia and World Wildlife Fund. 114 pp. ISBN 0-89164-169-6.
- Cooper, E.W.T. (2003). Enforcement support training by Justice Institute of British Columbia. TRAFFIC Dispatches, No. 20, p: 13.
- Yates, B.C., Dratch, P.A. and Cooper, E.W.T. (1995). Manipulated Genitalia: Evidence of Fraud in the Wildlife Medicinal Trade. Presented to the Northwest Association of Forensic Scientists Annual Meeting. Poster.
- Cooper, E.W.T. (1991). An Introduction to Rearing Larval Marine Fishes. FAMA, February 1991, pp: 120 -121, 126, 128.
- Ishiyama, M., Yoshie, S., Teraki, Y., and Cooper, E.W.T. (1991). Ultrastructure of Pleromin, a Highly Mineralized Tissue Comprising Crystalline Calcium Phosphate Known as Whitlockite, in Holocephalian Tooth Plates. In S. Suga & H. Nakahara (Eds.) Mechanisms and Phylogeny of Mineralization in Biological Systems. Chap. 4.19, Tokyo, Japan.
- Cooper, E.W.T. (1989). The Skin Trade in Western Canada; Importations of Reptile Products from 1986 to 1989. Presented to the Thirteenth International Herpetological Symposium. Proceedings pp: 205-214.
- Cooper, E.W.T. (1989). Exotic Species Identification by the Vancouver Public Aquarium for CITES Enforcement. Presented to the Western Regional Conference of the American Association of Zoological Parks and Aquariums. Proceedings pp: 350-357.
- Cooper, E.W.T. (1988). An Evaluation of Selco for Improving the Nutritional Value of the Brine Shrimp, Artemia salina. FAMA, April 1988, p: 121.
