= Megan Leslie =

Canadian politician and environmental advocate (born 1973)

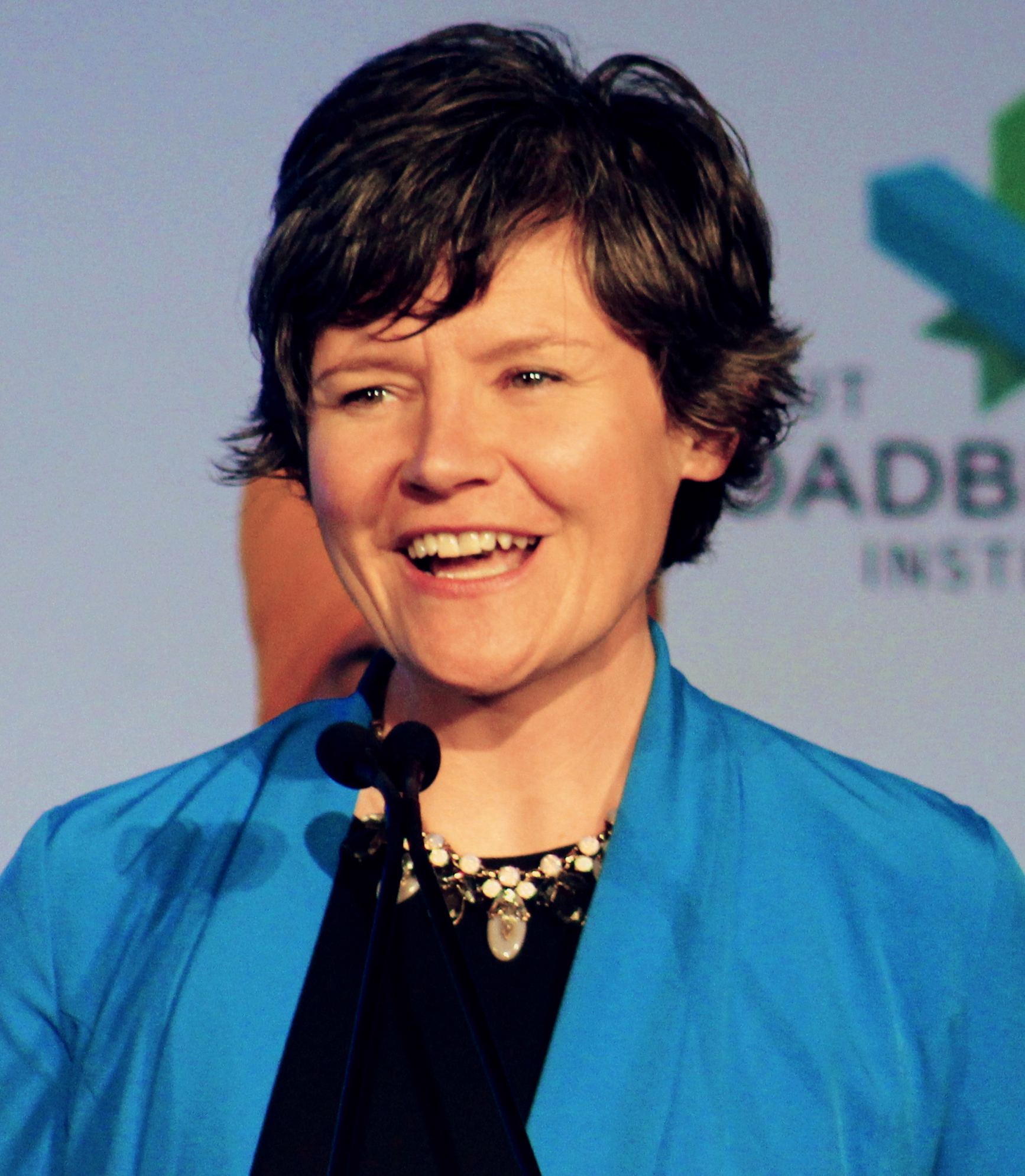
- Leslie in 2016

President and CEO of WWF-Canada
- Incumbent
- Assumed office December 1, 2017
- Preceded by: David Miller

Member of Parliament for Halifax
- In office October 14, 2008 – October 18, 2015
- Preceded by: Alexa McDonough
- Succeeded by: Andy Fillmore

Deputy Leader of the New Democratic Party
- In office April 19, 2012 – October 18, 2015 Serving with Libby Davies and David Christopherson
- Leader: Thomas Mulcair
- Preceded by: Thomas Mulcair and Libby Davies
- Succeeded by: David Christopherson singly

Personal details
- Born: September 29, 1973 (age 52) Toronto, Ontario, Canada
- Party: New Democratic Party
- Occupation: Community legal worker

Megan Anissa Leslie (born September 29, 1973) is a Canadian politician and environmental advocate. She is the president and CEO of World Wildlife Fund Canada (WWFC) and on the advisory board of the Leaders' Debates Commission.

Leslie was previously the federal Member of Parliament for the electoral district of Halifax from the 2008 Canadian federal election until her defeat in 2015. She is a member of the New Democratic Party and served as the party's critic for the environment. In 2012, Leslie was named as one of the deputy leaders of the Official Opposition – one of the youngest MPs ever to be selected for the post.

== Early life and career ==
Leslie was raised in Kirkland Lake, Ontario. She holds a Bachelor of Arts in Social & Political Thought and History and a Certificate in Refugee and Migration Studies, both from York University. She has a law degree from Dalhousie University.

Leslie is the daughter of Finnish immigrants and grew up in a Finnish community in Kirkland Lake. She has attended Finnish events such as the Annual Suurjuhlat (Grand Fest). In 2010, Megan Leslie gave the first Varpu Lindström lecture, an annual event created in honour of Professor Varpu Lindström, a historian at York University (Toronto). Leslie also spent a year studying at the University of Tampere in Finland.

After earning her law degree, she worked for the Dalhousie Legal Aid Service in a community in Halifax. She has a background in social justice advocacy on poverty issues and is a founding member of the Affordable Energy Coalition (AEC). As a member of AEC, she advocated cheaper energy rates to help low-income earners. She was part of a successful settlement agreement with Nova Scotia Power Inc. regarding energy efficiency programs. She has advocated at Residential Tenancies, Small Claims, Income Assistance Appeal Board, CPP Disability Tribunal, and Utility and Review Board hearings. Leslie has coordinated mobile legal info clinics in the Halifax area. These include Direction 180, Stepping Stone, Metropolitan Immigrant Settlement Association (now Immigrant Services Association of Nova Scotia), Metro Turning Point, Bayers Westwood Parent Resource Centre, Single parent Centre, and Adsum House. Leslie also developed the "Tenant Rights Project" that worked directly with low-income earners to reduce rates of homelessness.

In 2005, Leslie attended the United Nations Framework Convention on Climate Change in Montreal to present on the issue of energy poverty. She has also made presentations to the Canadian Public Health Association national conference, the Atlantic Regional Association of Immigrant Settlement Associations and the national conference of the Public Legal Education Association of Canada.

She has been with her partner Brendan Haley since at least 2007. During the 2011 election, she said, "Brendan has taken on the domestic role completely, from shopping to cooking to cleaning the tub." He has a PhD from Carleton University, and works as the Policy Director at Efficiency Canada, the national voice for an energy efficient economy.

== Member of Parliament ==
Leslie was nominated as the NDP's candidate in Halifax after former party leader Alexa McDonough announced her retirement from politics as of the 2008 election. She won with 6,800 more votes than her nearest opponent.

=== Health critic ===
Leslie launched an initiative as the NDP's health critic to propose a national pharmacare plan to pay for expensive prescription drugs.

She also introduced a private member's bill to create a national strategy for suicide prevention, which has garnered the support of some municipal councils.

She was also noted for being "well-briefed on the controversy surrounding Assisted Human Reproduction Canada last spring, when several board members resigned amid allegations of lack of transparency over spending."

=== Environment critic ===
Leslie was re-elected with an increased majority in 2011.

Leslie re-introduced the NDP's Climate Change Accountability Act in the House of Commons in June 2011 after it was defeated by the unelected and appointed Senate in 2010.

In 2012, Leslie was the target of hate mail after The Hill Times misattributed a quotation critical of ATV drivers from Green Party leader Elizabeth May to the NDP MP.

In 2013, Leslie criticized Conservative Cabinet Minister Keith Ashfield in the House of Commons for comments he had previously made.

In March 2015, her Opposition Day Motion to ban microbeads in Canada was passed unanimously by Parliament, ensuring that microbeads would be added to the list of toxic substances managed by the government under the Canadian Environmental Protection Act, 1999.

Leslie worked collaboratively with other parties to create Sable Island National Park, has led the fight for federal monies owed to HRM for Citadel Hill in Halifax, and successfully passed Second Reading of her Private Members Bill to save Sambro Island Lighthouse.

== Out of politics ==
Leslie lost her Halifax seat to Andy Fillmore in the October 2015 federal election as the Liberals swept all the Atlantic Canada seats. In December 2015, Leslie was hired by World Wildlife Fund Canada as a senior consultant on ocean governance as part of a five-year plan to cooperate with the federal and provincial governments. However, the World Wildlife Fund Canada temporary role ended in June, when she was expected to work back home in Halifax, where her partner was awarded a Postdoctoral Fellowship at Dalhousie University. On October 26, 2017, she was announced as President and CEO of World Wildlife Fund Canada.

After Tom Mulcair was ousted as NDP leader, Leslie was considered a candidate for the New Democratic Party leadership election to replace him, she declined, saying that she was tired and out of energy and that she could not see herself running again before 2019.

== LGBT advocacy ==
Leslie has called herself a queer activist.

Leslie did an undergraduate thesis on Supreme Court of Canada case law relating to gay and lesbian issues.

She also presented an educational workshop for the Nova Scotia Human Rights Commission on gender identity and was involved in the campaign to get sex reassignment surgery covered by Nova Scotia's provincial health care plan.

Leslie was the main seconder of Bill C-389, An Act to Amend the Canadian Human Rights Act and Criminal Code (gender identity and gender expression), known as the trans rights bill. At third reading, noting the absence of any openly trans members of Parliament, Leslie used her time to read letters from people who had contacted her office.

== Awards and accolades ==
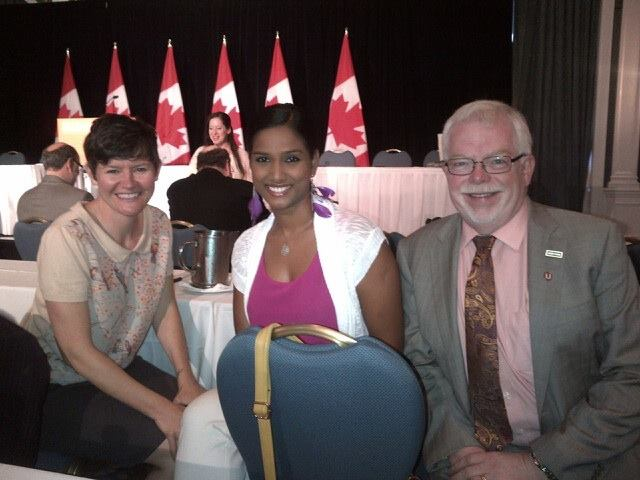
Leslie, Rathika Sitsabaiesan and Mike Sullivan at the NDP Caucus strategy session in Saskatoon

In 2011, Leslie was chosen as one of the "five best Canadian members of Parliament" by The Mark News.

In May 2009, Leslie was chosen as "Best Rookie" by Maclean's in their third annual Parliamentarians of the Year awards.

In February 2010, an essay by Leslie was featured in an Americas Quarterly issue titled "Voices from the New Generation", which featured 29 young business, political, and civic leaders from across the Americas. In her essay, Leslie expressed her belief in her generation's recognition of the complexity of social change, and her style of politics that recognizes the need for robust community participation as well as representation in parliament.

In December 2010, she was voted as the favourite "Up and Comer" on Parliament Hill and was picked as one of the year's top MPs by columnist David Akin.

Readers of The Coast weekly newspaper in Halifax voted her as "Best Halifax Member of Parliament" in 2009 and 2010 and 2011 and 2012 and 2013 and 2014. In 2008, she was Voted "Best Activist".

In 2013, Leslie received the Paul Harris Fellow recognition by the Rotary Club of Halifax Northwest.

In 2015, Leslie was named a Top 10 Environmental Leader in Canada by Power & Influence magazine. In the same year, she was also named one of the most influential people in government and politics by The Hill Times.

Before entering politics she received: Muriel Duckworth award for raising consciousness of women's issues and feminism in the legal community; Holly House Heroes award (Elizabeth Fry) for work in housing and homelessness; Weldon Community Commitment Award; Dalhousie Governor's Award for exceptional leadership in the University and community; MacIntosh Bursary for outstanding public service; CBA Law Day Award for encouraging and promoting access to justice.

Leslie is the recipient of an honorary degree from Mount Saint Vincent University in Halifax.

== Electoral record ==
2015 Canadian federal election: Halifax
Party	Candidate	Votes	%	±%	Expenditures
Liberal	Andy Fillmore	27,431	51.73	+26.08	$134,528.53
New Democratic	Megan Leslie	19,162	36.13	–15.49	$169,615.12
Conservative	Irvine Carvery	4,564	8.61	–9.41	$22,288.40
Green	Thomas Trappenberg	1,745	3.29	–1.10	$692.58
Marxist–Leninist	Allan Bezanson	130	0.25	-0.09	–
Total valid votes/expense limit		53,032	99.51		$204,329.68
Total rejected ballots		259	0.49		
Turnout		53,291	72.62		
Eligible voters		73,379			
Liberal gain from New Democratic		Swing		+20.78	
Source: Elections Canada

2011 Canadian federal election: Halifax
Party	Candidate	Votes	%	±%	Expenditures
New Democratic	Megan Leslie	23,746	51.64	+8.95	$82,238.55
Liberal	Stan Kutcher	11,793	25.64	-1.98	$78,191.23
Conservative	George Nikolaou	8,276	18.00	-2.61	$48,637.42
Green	Michael Dewar	2,020	4.39	-4.32	$1,663.22
Marxist–Leninist	Tony Seed	152	0.33	-0.03	none listed
Total valid votes/expense limit		45,987	99.48		$84,606.68
Total rejected, unmarked and declined ballots		241	0.52	+0.01	
Turnout		46,228	63.02	+2.35	
Eligible voters		73,357			
New Democratic hold		Swing		+5.46	

2008 Canadian federal election: Halifax
Party	Candidate	Votes	%	±%	Expenditures
New Democratic	Megan Leslie	19,252	42.69	-4.19	$74,406.04
Liberal	Catherine Meade	12,458	27.62	-3.27	$44,352.90
Conservative	Ted Larsen	9,295	20.61	+2.61	$57,956.79
Green	Darryl Whetter	3,931	8.72	+4.82	$1,734.06
Marxist–Leninist	Tony Seed	162	0.36	+0.03	none listed
Total valid votes/expense limit		45,098	99.49		$81,457
Total rejected, unmarked and declined ballots		230	0.51	+0.09	
Turnout		45,328	60.67	-4.59	
Eligible voters		74,717			
New Democratic hold		Swing		-0.46	
