= Varpu Lindström =

Canadian historian and educator

- Born: 1948; Helsinki
- Died: 2012 (aged 63–64)

Academic work
- Discipline: History, women's studies
- Main interests: Social history of Finnish women in Canada
- Notable works: Letters from Karelia

Varpu Lindström (1948–2012) was a Canadian historian and educator. She was the leading expert on the social history of Finnish women in Canada.

== Personal life and career ==
Born in Helsinki, she emigrated to Canada as a teen in 1963 with her family. She was a respected historian and professor of History and Women's Studies at York University. She founded the Canadian Friends of Finland friendship society in 1982, which encouraged cultural exchanges between the two countries. Her research contributed to the creation of Kelly Saxberg's 2004 historical documentary Letters from Karelia about the fate of Finnish Canadians lured back to Soviet Karelia only to be killed in Stalinist purges of the 1930s.

Lindström died in 2012.

== Selected publications ==
- Lindström, Varpu (1979). The Finnish immigrant community of Toronto, 1887-1913. Toronto, Ont.: Multicultural History Society of Ontario. ISBN 0969091656. OCLC 9282945.
- Lindström-, Varpu (1988). Defiant sisters : a social history of the Finnish immigrant women in Canada, 1890-1930. Ottawa: National Library of Canada. ISBN 0315358041. OCLC 18873954.
- Melting into great waters : papers from Finnforum V. Lindström, Varpu, 1948-, Saarinen, Oiva., Vähämäki, K. Börje., Finn Forum (5th : 1996 : Laurentian University, Sudbury, Ont.). Toronto: Finnish Studies Program, University of Toronto. 1997. ISBN 0772780528. OCLC 42145492.
- Lindström, Varpu (2010). "I won't be a slave!" : selected articles on Finnish Canadian women's history. Beaverton, Ont.: Aspasia Books. ISBN 9780978348885. OCLC 645753246.
- Lindström, Varpu (2010). From heroes to enemies : Finns in Canada, 1937-1947. Beaverton, Ont.: Aspasia Books. ISBN 9780986716416. OCLC 689503970.
- Lindström, Varpu (2012). Letters from an immigrant teenager : Varpu's letters to Kaisa, 1963-1965. Vähämäki, K. Börje. Beaverton, Ont.: Aspasia Books. ISBN 9780986716423. OCLC 773473749.
- Lindstrom-Best, Varpu (2018). The Finns in Canada. Ottawa, ON, CA. OCLC 1027687850.

== Awards and honours ==
- She was one of the first to receive York University's Atkinson Teaching Award in 1989.
- In 1992, she was awarded the Knight of the Order of the White Rose of Finland, First Class, in recognition of outstanding service to Finland and Finnish Canadians.
- She received the Queen Elizabeth II Diamond Jubilee Medal 2012.
- The University of Toronto hosts an annual memorial lecture in her honour.
