= Finglish =

Mixture of English and Finnish languages

Finglish is a mixture of Finnish and English. The term was coined by professor Martti Nisonen in the 1920s in Hancock, Michigan, United States to describe the language he encountered in America. The word is first recorded in English in 1943. However, the word is now also used to describe English influences on Finnish in Finland itself.

As the term describes, Finglish is a macaronic mixture of the English and Finnish languages. In Finglish, the English lexical items are nativized and inserted into the framework of Finnish morphology and syntax. Many consider the adoption of English loanwords into Finnish phonology, morphology, and syntax not to be proper Finnish, but rather a language in between. The term Finglish can imply that this adoption of loanwords and usage of language is incomplete and somehow less legitimate. However, this use of loanwords and code-switching amongst bilingual speakers is typical in communities experiencing language shift. The Finnish immigrants of the United States learned English out of necessity to succeed in their jobs; this resulted in what is known as Finglish. Finglish is also found in any place in Finland where international contact and popular culture exists, including Finnish language learners. This more recent (post-1980s) incorporation of English loanwords into modern Finnish as a result of globalization and advances in technology is a separate phenomenon from the North American Finnish, which developed primarily in the late 1800s to mid-1900s, though there are some similarities in form and function.

== Finglish in North America ==
American Finnish (amerikansuomi), also known as Fingliska or Fingelska, is a form of the Finnish language spoken in North America, and the historical meaning of the term "Finglish".

While almost all Finnish immigrants were able to read and write, it still took some time for many Finns to learn English because Finnish is a Finno-Ugric language, structurally unrelated to English and other Indo-European languages. Another reason for the delay is that many leaving Finland were farmers and laborers, and often migrated to areas of high Finnish settlement. Living and working with other Finnish speakers meant they had less need to learn English to get by in their day-to-day lives. Many other Finnish immigrants ended up in menial and industrial jobs, where they learned English through practice in order to get by in the workplace. Second- and third-generation Finnish Americans often learned to speak both Finnish and English, though the Finnish they learned differed from that spoken in Finland. This was due to a variety of reasons, including competing language inputs between Finnish and English and the fact that their Finnish input may have been different from that considered standard in Finland. Finglish originated amongst these first- and second-generation Finnish immigrants in US and Canada. The English language skills of the first-generation American Finns tended to be limited; second- and third-generation American Finns usually were more or less bilingual. Finglish emerged as a pidgin with something they already knew (Finnish) and something they were bound to learn (English).

As has been documented for several immigrant languages, one would expect that over time North American Finnish would reduce its inflectional system in favor of prepositions and analytic constructions. Nominal morphology is particularly vulnerable in heritage languages with robust morphology. As heritage speakers tend to become fluent in the majority language while never achieving native fluency in the heritage language, second- and third-generation speakers who learn the minority language from the first generation may not acquire the full inflectional system of the language spoken in the country of origin. The majority language may also influence the syntax and other features of the heritage language. Thus, North American Finnish differed not only in the lexical items used, but in aspects of morphology and syntax as well.

The majority of immigrants to America came from Ostrobothnia and the Northern Ostrobothnia areas in western Finland; over sixty percent of all emigrants who left the country between 1893 and 1920 came from Vaasa and Oulu. Many other Finnish immigrants were from the provinces of Savonia and Tavastia, and the Finnish spoken in North America also reflects those dialects.

== History of research ==
Much work has been done in the last fifty years to document the speech of Finnish Americans in the United States and Canada, though little new data has been brought forward in the last 25 years. Pertti Virtaranta did extensive research on the Finnish spoken in North America, particularly in the Upper Midwest and Canada, taking three trips from 1965 to 1980 to interview speakers. The interviews had standard questions asked of everyone, including why they (or their families) left Finland, what the trip was like, and what it was like to find a job once in America. Otherwise, the interviews consisted of free conversation on whatever subject the participants found most interesting. Maisa Martin wrote a dissertation on the phonology and morphology of American Finnish where she discusses the borrowings and changes between Finland Finnish and American Finnish. Donald Larmouth did extensive research on the Finnish used by four generations in rural Finnish communities in northern Minnesota, interviewing a total of 62 respondents. In his interviews he elicits personal narratives, has participants complete picture identification tasks with simple cartoons, and give translations of sentences. He documents what changes the language seems to have undergone, notably the leveling of several cases including the accusative and partitive. This previous work on American Finnish reveals a lower frequency of accusative case and partitive case in heritage bilingual speakers, with more pronounced changes the farther removed the generation was from the immigrant generation. In his interviews he elicits personal narratives, has participants complete picture identification tasks with simple cartoons, and give translations of sentences. While the partitive and accusative were vulnerable, other cases, including the illative and ablative, remained robust in the speech of these speakers, though adjective case endings were especially prone to deletion. These previous works focus primarily on Finnish speakers in Minnesota and Michigan, with Wisconsin underrepresented.

The most common characteristic of historical Finglish were (in descending order of frequency):

Phenomenon	Finglish	Finnish	English
Almost all voiced consonants in English are replaced by their voiceless counterparts in Finglish; /f/ is likewise replaced with /v/.	lumperi	puutavara	lumber
Almost all voiced consonants in English are replaced by their voiceless counterparts in Finglish; /f/ is likewise replaced with /v/.	piiri	olut, kalja	beer
Almost all voiced consonants in English are replaced by their voiceless counterparts in Finglish; /f/ is likewise replaced with /v/.	rapoli	ongelma	trouble
Almost all voiced consonants in English are replaced by their voiceless counterparts in Finglish; /f/ is likewise replaced with /v/.	karpetsi	roska(t)	garbage
Almost all voiced consonants in English are replaced by their voiceless counterparts in Finglish; /f/ is likewise replaced with /v/.	vörnitseri	huonekalu	furniture
Three contiguous vowels are not allowed. They are broken up by inserting either a back or front glide depending on the phonetic environment.	leijata	pelata, soittaa	to play
Three contiguous vowels are not allowed. They are broken up by inserting either a back or front glide depending on the phonetic environment.	sauveri	suihku	shower
Syllabic consonants are modified by inserting a vowel in front of them:	kaluna	gallona	gallon
Syllabic consonants are modified by inserting a vowel in front of them:	hanteli	kahva	handle
Words should end in a vowel (the preferred word-final vowel is /i/ but /a/ is also encountered)	reimi	kehys	frame
Words should end in a vowel (the preferred word-final vowel is /i/ but /a/ is also encountered)	kaara	auto, vaunu, kärry	car
Words should end in a vowel (the preferred word-final vowel is /i/ but /a/ is also encountered)	heerkatti	hiustyyli	haircut
Words should end in a vowel (the preferred word-final vowel is /i/ but /a/ is also encountered)	loijari	lakimies	lawyer
When the word in English begins with two or three consonants, all but the last consonant are dropped before the word is acceptable for Finglish.	raikki	isku, lakko	strike
When the word in English begins with two or three consonants, all but the last consonant are dropped before the word is acceptable for Finglish.	touvi	hella, liesi	stove
When the word in English begins with two or three consonants, all but the last consonant are dropped before the word is acceptable for Finglish.	rosseri	kauppa	grocery
Vowels are written phonetically, as in Finnish.	reitti	suora	straight
Vowels are written phonetically, as in Finnish.	raippi	raita, juova	stripe
Disappearance of possessive suffix, as in spoken Finnish.	meitin haussi	meidän talomme	our house

Words used in US Finglish often have completely different meanings in Finnish, especially when the Finglish terms are borrowings from English; they have become expressive loans: ruuma (from and meaning 'room'; in Finnish meaning 'cargo hold'), piiri ('beer'; 'district'), leijata ('to play'; 'to hover'), reisi ('crazy'; 'thigh'), and touvi ('stove'; 'halyard'). US Finglish compound words can produce combinations completely incomprehensible to native Finnish speakers, like piirikäki ('beer keg'; 'district cuckoo') or the somewhat less incomprehensible ilmapiika ('flight attendant'; 'air maid').

These older Finglish usages may not be bound to survive, and their original users are now in their 80s and 90s. The descendants of most American Finns are today either completely monolingual, or, if they have kept their ties to their grandparents' and great-grandparents' speech, use ordinary Finnish beside English.

Example of old-style Finglish:

Frank ja Wilbert oli Saran kanssa kaaralla käymäs vilitsis. Ne kävi haartveerstooris ostamas loonmouverin ja Sara kävi ottaan heerkatin piutisaluunasa. Kun ne tuli haussiin, niin mamma laitto äpylipaita.

which translates as

Frank and Wilbert were with Sara visiting the village by car. They went to hardware store to buy a lawn mower, while Sara had a haircut at beauty salon. When they came back to home, mom served apple pie.

For comparison, standard Finnish without anglicisms:

Frank ja Wilbert olivat Saran kanssa käymässä autolla kylässä. He kävivät rautakaupassa ostamassa ruohonleikkurin ja Sara kävi laitattamassa kampauksen kauneushoitolassa. Kun he tulivat kotiin, äiti laittoi omenapiirakkaa.

Relatively few words from Finglish have become standard Finnish, but note kämppä 'log cabin' or '(temporary) accommodation', from English camp; and mainari 'miner'. These may, however, be direct borrowings from English in Finland.

== Later Finglish ==
A new wave of Finglish has originated in Finland. Its sources are technology, popular culture, various sub-cultures, and fandom. It differs from slang in the sense that it also uses some English linguistic structures. Examples of some popular-culture Finglish expressions include vörkkiä ('to work'), biitsi ('beach'), spreijata ('to spray'), hengailla ('to hang out'), kruisailla ('to cruise in an automobile') and hevijuuseri ('heavy user'). While the earlier, North American Finglish was distinctively a working-class adult immigrants' language, the newer sort of Finglish is used by native Finnish youth in contact with the English language through mass and social media. Finglish terms of today are a transitional phase of absorption of new terms and ideas from English into mainstream Finnish before the full nativization of the words, especially in situations where English (a very productive yet compounding language) expresses a concept with one word, while Finnish would require several of them, or has no native term. This Finglish is not to be confused with Helsinki slang, though the latter has absorbed some English loan words, too, in recent times.

The characteristics of current Finglish, in descending order of frequency, are:

Phenomenon	Finglish	Finnish	English
Preservation of voiced consonants /b/, /d/ and /g/ as well as the unvoiced consonant /f/	biitsi	hiekkaranta	beach
Preservation of voiced consonants /b/, /d/ and /g/ as well as the unvoiced consonant /f/	bugi		bug, as programming error
Preservation of voiced consonants /b/, /d/ and /g/ as well as the unvoiced consonant /f/	dellata	poistaa	to delete
Preservation of voiced consonants /b/, /d/ and /g/ as well as the unvoiced consonant /f/	delata	kuolla	to die
Preservation of voiced consonants /b/, /d/ and /g/ as well as the unvoiced consonant /f/	digata	tykätä	to dig, in sense of 'to feel affection'
Preservation of voiced consonants /b/, /d/ and /g/ as well as the unvoiced consonant /f/	giikki		geek
Preservation of voiced consonants /b/, /d/ and /g/ as well as the unvoiced consonant /f/	fleimi		an Internet flame, a nasty Internet reply
Preservation of voiced consonants /b/, /d/ and /g/ as well as the unvoiced consonant /f/	fleimata		to write/send a nasty Internet reply or to burn
Preservation of consonant clusters in the beginning of the words as in Southwestern Finnish dialects	kreisi	hullu	crazy
Preservation of consonant clusters in the beginning of the words as in Southwestern Finnish dialects	printteri	tulostin	printer
Preservation of consonant clusters in the beginning of the words as in Southwestern Finnish dialects	skipata	jättää väliin	to skip, to pass something
Preservation of consonant clusters in the beginning of the words as in Southwestern Finnish dialects	trabeli	ongelma	trouble
Word ending in a vowel as in Old Finglish, almost exclusively in /i/. Duplication of the English final consonant before the final /i/	keissi	tapaus	case
Word ending in a vowel as in Old Finglish, almost exclusively in /i/. Duplication of the English final consonant before the final /i/	disketti	levyke	diskette
Word ending in a vowel as in Old Finglish, almost exclusively in /i/. Duplication of the English final consonant before the final /i/	floppi		flop, failure
Vowels written out phonetically as in Old Finglish, umlaut denoting frontal vowel	staili	tyylikäs, tyyli	stylish, style
Vowels written out phonetically as in Old Finglish, umlaut denoting frontal vowel	bändi	yhtye	band, orchestra
Vowels written out phonetically as in Old Finglish, umlaut denoting frontal vowel	nörtti		nerd
Vowels written out phonetically as in Old Finglish, umlaut denoting frontal vowel	räppi		rap music
Vowels written out phonetically as in Old Finglish, umlaut denoting frontal vowel	nevöhööd		never heard
Replacement of English: c with k or s; ch with ts; th with d; x with ks; j with ds; w with v	klikata	napsauttaa	to click
Replacement of English: c with k or s; ch with ts; th with d; x with ks; j with ds; w with v	tsekata	tarkistaa	to check
Replacement of English: c with k or s; ch with ts; th with d; x with ks; j with ds; w with v	fiksata	korjata	to fix
Replacement of English: c with k or s; ch with ts; th with d; x with ks; j with ds; w with v	biifdsööki	kuivaliha	beef jerky
Replacement of English: c with k or s; ch with ts; th with d; x with ks; j with ds; w with v	pätsätä	paikata	to patch, as in updating software
Replacement of English: c with k or s; ch with ts; th with d; x with ks; j with ds; w with v	vörkkiä	toimia	to work, to function
Conceptual replacement of Finnish instructive mene 'go with' with ota 'take'	ota juna	mene junalla	take the train
Conceptual replacement of Finnish instructive mene 'go with' with ota 'take'	ota itäreitti	mene itäreittiä	take the east route
You-impersonal (sinä-passiivi); using sinä 'you' as the formal subject of an impersonal sentence. This may actually be an older phenomenon than English influence, as it also has appeared in certain Karelian dialects.	Jos sinä et syö, sinä et elä.	Jos ei syö, ei elä.	If you don't eat, you don't live.

An example of today's Finglish might be:

Mä lainasin faijan autoo ja me mentiin Mikan, Jennin ja Hannan kanssa kruisaamaan. Ensin haettiin gasoo, sitten käytiin syömässä Mäkissä bögöt ja lopulta mentiin biitsille.

which translates as

I borrowed Dad's car and we went together with Mika, Jenni and Hanna cruising around. We first went to get some gasoline, then went to McDonald's (Mäkki < Mäkdonalds < McDonald's) to have burgers and in the end we went to the beach.

For comparison, without anglicisms, but still colloquial:

Mä lainasin faijan autoo ja me mentiin Mikan, Jennin ja Hannan kanssa ajelulle. Ensin haettiin löpöö, sitten käytiin syömässä [pikaruokalan] purilaiset ja lopulta mentiin rantsuun.

And, in more literary Finnish:

Lainasin isäni autoa ja menimme Mikan, Jennin ja Hannan kanssa ajelulle. Ensin haimme polttoainetta, sitten kävimme pikaruokalassa syömässä hampurilaiset ja lopulta menimme rannalle.

== Technical speech ==
Finglish is today used most commonly in technology-related speech, where the majority of the loanwords originate in English. Since the English and Finnish language morphologies are vastly different and English pronunciation seldom fits in the Finnish speech immediately, the loan's orthography and pronunciation are nativized. Direct Finglish teknopuhe ('techspeak') expressions include printteri ('printer' – it is currently being ousted by the native word tulostin), modeemi 'modem', and prosessori or prossu ('processor' – there is even a puristic word, suoritin, which is heard often enough, but is still less common than the borrowings). Reified initialisms in Finglish include seepu from English CPU, and dimmi from DIMM. Finglish is usually considered a transitional phase from literal loans into translationary loans (calques). Examples of Finglish calques are emolevy 'motherboard', näyttö 'display', ulkoistaa 'to outsource', and sähköposti ('electronic mail' – the Finglish words eemeli [which, capitalized, is also a male name, the Finnish version of Emil]; iimeili or meili are still quite common). An example of a word where the transition is partial, is webbiselain 'Web browser', where the word web has not yet been translated into Finnish verkko (verkkoselain is however now the standard term and is widely used).

An example of Finnish techspeak:

Mä tsekkasin sen serverin. Siinä oli täys snafu päällä. Siitä oli poveri kärtsännyt ja se oli sitten krässännyt totaalisesti. Kun sitä ei oltu ajettu hallitusti alas, siitä oli käyttispartitio korruptoitunut eikä se enää buutannut. Mä fiksasin siihen uuden poverin ja buuttasin sen korpulta.

which would translate in English to:

I checked the server. It was in a complete SNAFU. Its power supply had burnt out and it had then crashed totally. As it was not shut down in an orderly manner, its operating system partition was corrupted and it no longer booted. I fixed it with a new power supply and booted it from a floppy disk.

and a less anglicised, but still colloquial Finnish:

Mä tarkistin sen palvelimen. Se oli täysin hajalla. Siitä oli virtalähde kärtsännyt ja se oli sitten mennyt aivan jumiin. Kun sitä ei oltu ajettu hallitusti alas, siitä oli käyttisosio pilalla eikä se enää käynnistynyt. Mä hoidin siihen uuden virtalähteen ja käynnistin sen korpulta.

An approximation in literary Finnish:

Tarkistin sen palvelimen. Se oli täysin hajalla. Siitä oli virtalähde kärähtänyt ja se oli sitten mennyt aivan jumiin. Kun sitä ei ollut ajettu hallitusti alas, siitä oli käyttöjärjestelmäosio pilalla eikä se enää käynnistynyt. Hoidin siihen uuden virtalähteen ja käynnistin sen levykkeeltä.

== Neologisms ==
Sometimes English words are used as the basis of Finnish conceptual neologisms, like nörtti 'computer enthusiast', from English nerd; or nyypiö, nyyppä, or noobi 'newbie', i.e. 'beginner' (the first two variants influenced by the native Finnish hyypiö, meaning a 'freak' or 'eccentric person').

Since most current Finglish users are fluent in Finnish and to some extent English, direct translations are sometimes used in humorous or oxymoronic concepts, such as julkinen talo (literally 'public house') for pubi (borrowed long ago from English), or käytännöllinen pila (lit. 'practical joke') for native Finnish kepponen ('prank', 'shenanigan').

English loanwords that originate in Latin are usually amalgamated in Finnish by using the Latin and not English orthography and grammar.

== See also ==
- Tankero
- American Finnish
