= American Finnish =

Form of the Finnish language spoken in North America

- Native to: United States, Canada
- Native speakers: 26,000 (in their homes) United States (2013); 15,295 Canada (2016)
- Language family: Uralic: Finnic; Finnish; American Finnish

Language codes
- ISO 639-3: –
- IETF: fi-021
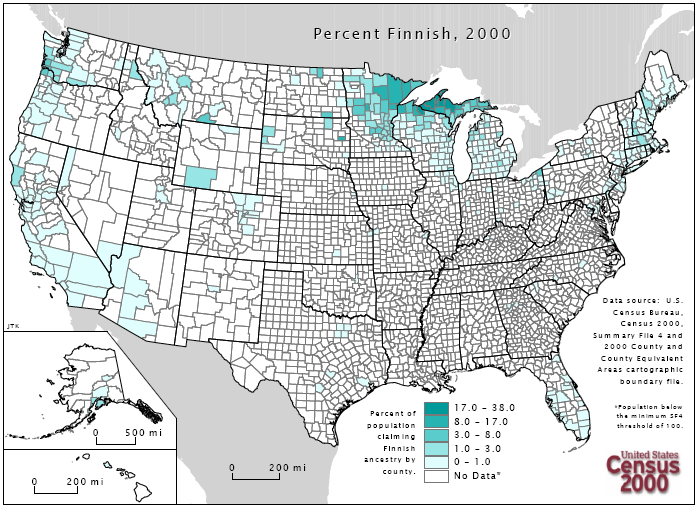
- Location of Finnish people in America; however, only a few can speak American Finnish.

American Finnish, Fingliska or Fingelska is a form of the Finnish language spoken in North America. It has been heavily influenced by the English language. American Finnish was used actively until the 1950s and after that it has been declining, and Finnish Americans have been switching to English. Even some basic phrases like tätsrait 'that's right' were borrowed from English. The form of speech was studied by Pertti Virtaranta in 1960, and the first American Finnish dictionary was made in 1992. It has influence from English both in syntax and vocabulary. In 2013 Finnish was spoken by 26,000 people in their homes. In the town of Oulu, Wisconsin, there are documented third-generation speakers of American Finnish, and in Stanton Township, Michigan, there are children who speak the language. American Finnish has also retained loanwords from Swedish which are not used in modern standard Finnish.

Those in the second and third generations who speak American Finnish are usually bilingual and tend to use English more often. There have been some negative attitudes to "impurities" in American Finnish; however, American Finns usually consider it a language of their own and dislike linguistic purism.

Finnish Americans sometimes have problems understanding Finnish. There is not much areal variation in American Finnish; however, first-, second- and third-generation speakers have more variation in their speech, especially as the amount of English influence differs in generations.

== Features ==
There are also grammatical differences from Finnish, such as consonant gradation. In American Finnish the letter k remains unchanged, unlike in Finnish: laki 'law', lakit 'laws' (Finnish: laki, lait). And in American Finnish the first person plural ending has often been dropped: me ei saa 'we can't' (Finnish: emme saa). Another difference in American Finnish is that the sound /i/ does not change into an /e/ when conjugated: kieli 'language', kielit 'languages' (Finnish: kieli, kielet).

== Vocabulary ==
American Finnish has many loanwords from English, but has also retained some older Swedish loanwords that are not used in standard Finnish.

English	Fingelska	Modern Finnish
bed	peti	sänky
blanket	plänketti	peitto
kitchen	kyökki/kitsi	keittiö
onion	lööki	sipuli
telephone	telefooni	puhelin
telegram	telekrammi	sähke
hay barn	heinä baana	heinälato
hospital	hospitaali	sairaala
county	kaunti	maakunta
farm	farmi	maatalo
room	ruuma	huone
potato	potaatti	peruna
towel	hantuuki	pyyhe

== Grammar ==
=== Cases ===
Word ruuma 'room' in the cases
Case	Fingelska
nominative	ruuma
genitive	ruuman
accusative	ruuman
essive	ruumana
partitive	ruumaa
translative	ruumaksi
inessive	ruumassa
elative	ruumasta
illative	ruumaan
adessive	ruumalla
ablative	ruumalta
allative	ruumalle
comitative	ruumineen
instructive	ruumin

In American Finnish the possessive suffixes are rarely used.

== Examples of American Finnish ==
On heitä enemmän, mutta he ovat nyt muusia hunttaamassa.

'There are more of them, but they are moose hunting.'

fiksata

'to fix'

'Nyt pitää äkkiä koolata Albertille

'Now I have to call to Albert fast.'

== See also ==
- Finnish Americans
- Finnish Canadians
- Oulu, Wisconsin
- Finglish
