= Tiia Strandén =

Tiia Strandén (born 25 September 1970) is a literary agent and cultural administrator. She has served as Director of FILI – Finnish Literature Exchange since 1 February 2017. FILI is a non-profit organisation affiliated with the Finnish Literature Society that promotes literature from Finland abroad.

== Early life and education ==
Strandén was born into a Finnish-speaking family in Aavasaksa, Ylitornio, Finland. At the age of four, she moved with her parents to Västerås, Sweden, where she grew up. She attended a Finnish-language primary school but received her later schooling in Swedish.

In 1990, Strandén returned to Finland to study philosophy and Nordic literature in a Swedish-language degree programme at the bilingual University of Helsinki. She completed her studies with a Master of Arts degree. Her master's thesis (pro gradu avhandling, 1998) examined the reception of the novel Katrina by Sally Salminen.

== Career ==
After completing her studies, Strandén worked for several years as a cultural secretary at The Nordic Institute in Finland (now Nordisk kulturkontakt), a cultural centre operated by the Nordic Council of Ministers. In addition to her work in the cultural sector, she was also active for a time as a Swedish-language teacher.

In 2011, during the preparations for Finland's role as Guest of Honour at the Frankfurt Book Fair 2014, Strandén joined FILI as a specialist in Finland-Swedish literature. She served as Deputy Director from August 2016 to January 2017 and was appointed Director on 1 February 2017.

== Personal life ==
Strandén holds Swedish citizenship. She has described herself as simultaneously Finland-Swedish, Finnish, and Swedish, stating: "I am not exclusively a Finland-Swede." Her children, who were born in Finland and with whom she speaks Swedish, have developed a Finland-Swedish linguistic identity.

== Honours ==
- 2022: Order of the White Rose of Finland, Knight (Chevalier)

== Selected publications ==
- 2002: Men det var hennes kläder: Nedslag i den samtida svenskspråkiga kvinnolitteraturen, Söderström, Helsinki (in Swedish; co-edited with Rita Paqvalén)
- 2007: Detta är inte fiktion: 18 nordiska samtidspoeter, Söderström, Helsinki (in Swedish; co-edited with Oscar Rossi)
- 2008: Tråkboken: Om att bejaka vardagens tristess, Söderström, Helsinki (in Swedish; co-edited with Susanna Sucksdorff)
- 2008: Replik: Om finlandssvensk teater i samtiden, Söderström, Helsinki (in Swedish; co-edited with Rita Paqvalén)
