= Jumi =

Finnish deity

Jumi is a deity in Finnish mythology whose role has remained unclear.

== Name ==
The name is connected to the word jumala, which means 'god' in Finnish and also refers to the monotheistic God. Many Finno-Ugric peoples have gods with similar names: Estonian Jummal, Sámi Jubmel or Ibmel, Komi Jen, Samoyed Jum ~ Num, and Mari Juma. These words are also used to refer to the monotheistic God. Norse sagas also mention a god named Jómali worshipped in Bjarmaland.

According to M.A. Castrén, the name Jumala means a specific sky god who was sometimes also associated with lightning. Some of Ukko's epithets include the word, such as ylijumala 'jumala above'. The -la ending denotes a place, so Castrén has theorized that jumala has three meanings: sky, sky god, and 'god' in general. However, after the latter meaning became more common, people started calling the sky taivas (Germanic loan word) and sky god Ukko. According to a later theory, the name jumala could be a loan from a Proto-Indo-Iranian language word related to Sanskrit dyumā́n 'bright, shining'.

Olla jumissa 'to be in jumi' is Finnish for 'to be stuck'. However, in Western Finland, the term has also referred to having intercourse. A connection has been made to the Latvian word jumis 'double ear (of a grain plant); (something) grown attached to each other'. Jumis is also a Baltic fertility deity.

== Connections made to fertility cults ==
=== Juminkeko and Jumin kurikka ===
Juminkeko 'Jumi's pile' and Jumin kurikka 'Jumi's mallet' are unclear terms that exist in Finnish folklore, referring to something which stands firm. They have been used to mean napakivi 'a standing stone in the middle of something', literally 'nave/pivot/center stone', which has been connected to phallic imagery of fertility cults. Napakivi is also called tonttukivi 'field stone' and mulkkukivi 'dick stone'. These stones were respected and not touched, and likely served the purpose of increasing the field's fertility. If Jumi's connection to an old fertility cult is true, the name became demonized after the arrival of Christianity: to the Forest Finns, jumi and jummi mean the Devil. In Inari, Jummin kurikka meant a 'large, rough pine root system'. This can be compared to the Sámi cultic world pillar, which also has phallic associations.

Unto Salo wondered if Jumin kurikka could refer to the phallos of an already forgotten fertility god Jumi, or rather be a wooden or stone image of it. According to Risto Pulkkinen, the idea of a phallic cult of Jumi and napakivi is speculative but useful to ponder about, as Jumi could be an element not studied enough due to modesty reasons. Napakivi are mostly known from Western Finland only, but the terms related to Jumi can be found from all parts of Finland. In Eastern Finland, similar stone pillars have been called tuvanpatsas 'cottage's column', also connected to fertility and used to communicate with ancestors.

=== Jumihäät ===
Jumihäät 'Jumi wedding' was an event held in Ostrobothnia. During the event, the youth would party and dance together, and teen boys and girls slept next to each other. Intercourse in this situation was frowned upon, but still happened sometimes. In that case, it was best for the couple to get married lest they brought shame upon themselves. In 1758, Pastor J. Wegelius wrote the event was held for Jumi, the god of marriage, to increase luck in marriage, and was filled with inappropriate games, dancing, card games, drinks and food. In Muhos, a girl named Anna Caisa Ruuth had become pregnant in Jumihäät and killed the child, receiving the death penalty. This was, according to Wegelius, meant as a warning and intimidation for others. Despite the opposition of the church, the youth kept holding Jumi weddings, saying it was their ancient right to do so. Everyone dressed in their best, and girls might have also dressed up as brides. The ones who didn't get partners went around the village all night looking for couples ("kokot"), laughing at them when they found one. Thus, the relationship between the couple became public knowledge.

In Savonia, the youth valvoi jumia 'stayed up for jumi', which was akin to a date night that did not extend to any kind of physical touch. Juminmakaaminen 'lying in jumi' meant a couple lied down together, hugging each other, in full clothing and without moving.

== In runic songs ==
The term Jumi doesn't appear much in Finnish and Karelian runic songs. However, a White Karelian song mentions Jumin kurikka once, and a Kainuu spell against bears is addressed to 'Old man jumi, old woman jumi, / the former inhabitants of jumi!' Jumi ukko, jumi akka, / Jumin entiset eläjät!. In North Karelia, the same chant is with Juumi and in Ingria, with Jummi. A White Karelian song also says a sudden sharp pain was shot by Jumi. The latter is connected to a Christian era belief: in White Karelia, they said Jumi is "the devil's blind brother" who shot at humans and animals randomly. In Lönnrot's dictionary, he called Jumi a forest haltija, and sudden swellings were "shot by Jumi".

== Other usage ==
Tupajumi 'cottage jumi' is the Finnish name of the common furniture beetle. They, and especially the Hadrobregmus pertinax, make a ticking noise when attracting a mate. To Finns, the ticking was an omen of death. Juminkolu 'Jumi's rocky ground' or Pirunkolu 'Devil's rocky ground' means a haunted place in a forest, where a child has been buried and a child's cry can be heard. According to Johannes Tornaeus in the 17th century, Jumi was the ancestor of the Sámi. Possibly because of this, Christfried Ganander called Jumo or Jymi a giant, the same as Ymir.
