= Valhalla (youth portal) =

Youth portal run by the Nordic Council of Ministers

Valhalla is the Nordic Council of Ministers’ portal for children and youth culture in Denmark, Finland, Faroe Islands, Greenland, Iceland, Norway, Sweden and Åland. The portal features current developments taking place in architecture and design, visual art, dance and theatre, multicultural issues, film and media, research and education, games and physical exercise, literature and music in the Nordic region.

Primarily aimed at adults working with children and youth culture, the portal can also serve as a source of reference for young people and other persons who are interested in these issues. Valhalla's objectives are:

- to give information about children and youth culture in the Nordic countries
- to give information about national activities with a common Nordic relevance
- to share ideas and experience with all those working with children, youth and culture in the Nordic countries
- to create opportunities for contacts and network building in this field

Valhalla's editorial staff consists of a number of Nordic editors-in-chief and national editors in the Nordic countries and the autonomous areas. The national editors are responsible for national news and events. Valhalla is administered by Nifin – the Nordic Institute in Finland.
