= Hadrobregmus alternatus =

Scientific classification
- Kingdom: Animalia
- Phylum: Arthropoda
- Class: Insecta
- Order: Coleoptera
- Suborder: Polyphaga
- Family: Ptinidae
- Tribe: Hadrobregmini
- Genus: Hadrobregmus
- Species: H. alternatus

Binomial name
- Hadrobregmus alternatus (Fall, 1905)

Species of beetle

Hadrobregmus alternatus is a species of death-watch beetle in the family Ptinidae. It is found in North America.
