= Sweden Finnish =

Variety of Finnish spoken by Sweden Finns

Areas in southern Sweden with Finnish-speaking inhabitants

Sweden Finnish (Finnish: ruotsinsuomi; Swedish: Sverigefinska) is the variety of Finnish spoken in Sweden by around 250,000 active speakers. The grammar of Sweden Finnish does not significantly differ from Standard Finnish, but it does however contain some Swedish terminology. Sweden Finnish is the result of Finnish immigrants arriving in Sweden, mainly between 1954 and 1970. Possessive suffixes are rarely used in Sweden Finnish, but some words are used as articles.

Flag of the Finnish-speaking minority in Sweden, official symbol of the Sweden Finnish Delegation since 2014

The number of Finnish-speakers in Sweden has decreased significantly during the last decades, mainly due to lack of interest among younger generations to learn the language.

== Vocabulary ==
English	Swedish	Sweden Finnish	Finnish
sausage	korv	korvi	makkara
Estonians	estländare	estlantilaiset	virolaiset
archive	arkiv	arkiv	arkisto
must	måste	moste	olla pakko
special school	särskola	säärskuula	erityiskoulu
boring	tråkigt	trookiit	tylsä
cheer	heja på	heija byi	kannustaa
to print	skriva ut 'write out'	kirjoittaa ulos 'write out'	tulostaa
battery	batteri	patteri	paristo
