= Sweden Finns' Day =

Annual celebration on Finnish people in Sweden

- Flag of the Sweden Finns
- Official name: Finnish: ruotsinsuomalaisten päivä, Swedish: sverigefinnarnas dag
- Observed by: Sweden
- Date: 24 February
- Next time: 24 February 2027
- Frequency: annual
- Related to: Carl Axel Gottlund

Sweden Finns' Day (Finnish: ruotsinsuomalaisten päivä; Swedish: sverigefinnarnas dag) is an anniversary celebrated in Sweden on 24 February. The anniversary was approved by the Swedish Academy in 2010, and was held for the first time in 2011. 24 February was chosen as the date of the anniversary, as this was also the birthday of Carl Axel Gottlund, a collector of folk poetry and a defender of the status of the Finnish language. The purpose of the day is to celebrate the Sweden Finns and to recognize their history, language and culture as a part of Sweden's cultural heritage.

Municipalities that have a significant Finnish-speaking minority raise the Sweden Finnish flag on Sweden Finns' Day. However, this is not an official Flag Day. The anniversary is observed in various parts of Sweden, including Stockholm, Eskilstuna, Gothenburg, Västerås and Nykvarn. The day's program has included concerts, dance performances, writer visits, karaoke dances and theater performances for children. For example, in 2017, more than a thousand people attended the celebration at Stockholm City Hall. In 2013 in particular, the celebration was significant in many places, when the day was celebrated with official ceremonies for the first time.

In 2019, the seal was voted by the listeners of SR's Finnish-language channel Sveriges Radio Finska (formerly known as Sisuradio) as the symbolic national animal of the Sweden Finns.

== See also ==
- Sweden Finns
- Meänkieli
- Torne Valley
