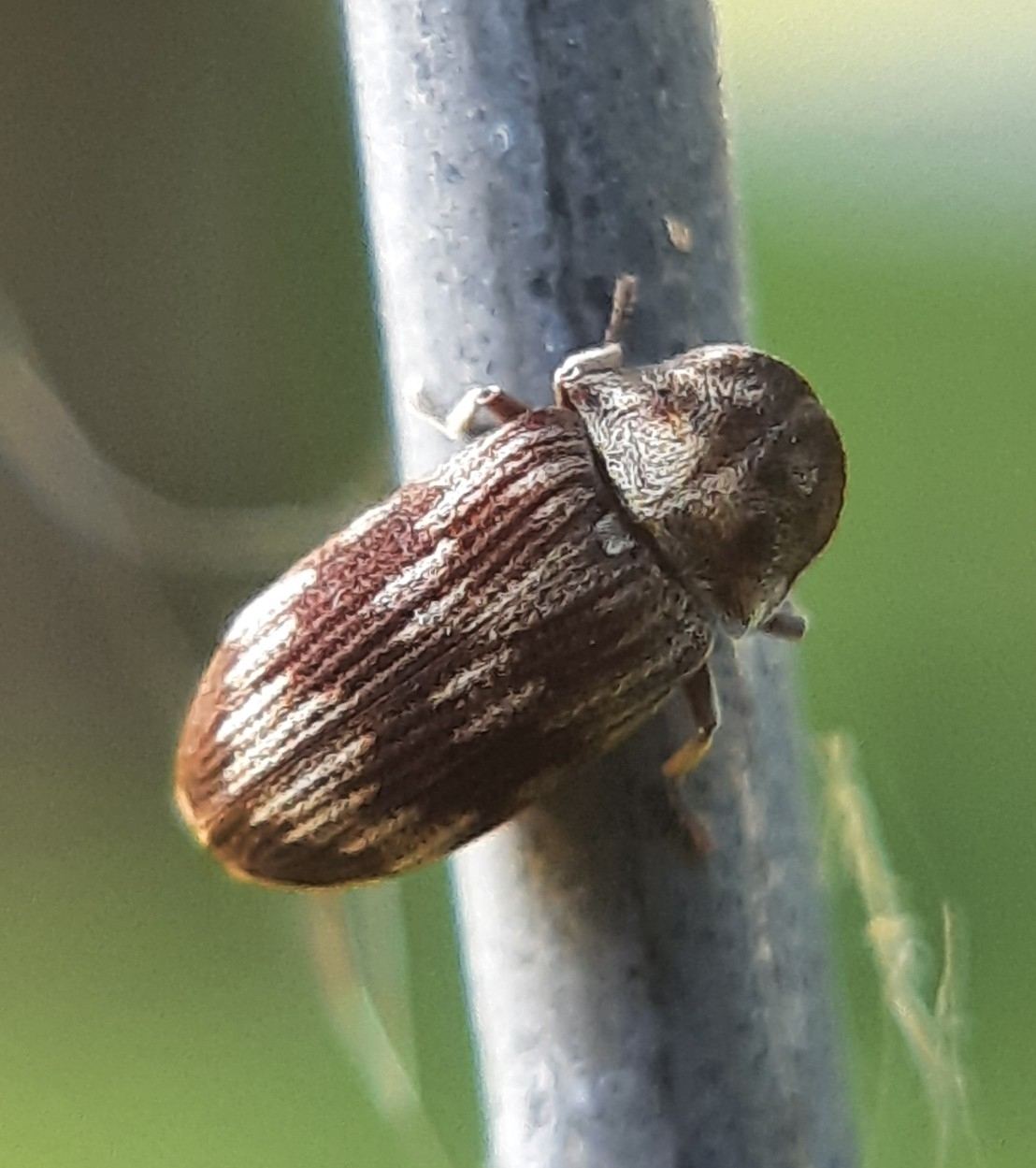

Scientific classification
- Kingdom: Animalia
- Phylum: Arthropoda
- Class: Insecta
- Order: Coleoptera
- Suborder: Polyphaga
- Family: Ptinidae
- Genus: Hadrobregmus
- Species: H. notatus

Binomial name
- Hadrobregmus notatus (Say, 1825)

= Hadrobregmus notatus =

Species of beetle

Hadrobregmus notatus is a species of death-watch beetle in the family Ptinidae. It is found in Eastern Canada and the Eastern United States.
