= FILI =

Finnish Literature Exchange

FILI – Finnish Literature Exchange is an organisation dedicated to promoting Finnish literature abroad. Its core activity is bringing literature from Finland in translation to the world. Tiia Strandén has been director since 2017.

FILI was established in 1977. It is a subdivision of the Finnish Literature Society (SKS). FILI is part of the TAIVE network of Finnish arts information organisations. It is a member of the NordLit network, which promotes translation from one Nordic language to another, and of the Literature Across Frontiers network, which aims to develop European intercultural dialogue through literature and translation.

FILI defines “Finnish literature” as works written in Finnish, Finland-Swedish, and Sámi languages, and in all genres, including fiction, poetry, non-fiction, children's and young adults books, and comics and graphic novels.

80% of FILI's funding comes from the Ministry of Education and Culture. Most of the remainder comes from private foundations and the Finnish Literature Society. Part of the funding for FILI's translation grants comes from the Nordic Council of Ministers, to support Nordic publishers acquiring the translation rights for Finnish books.

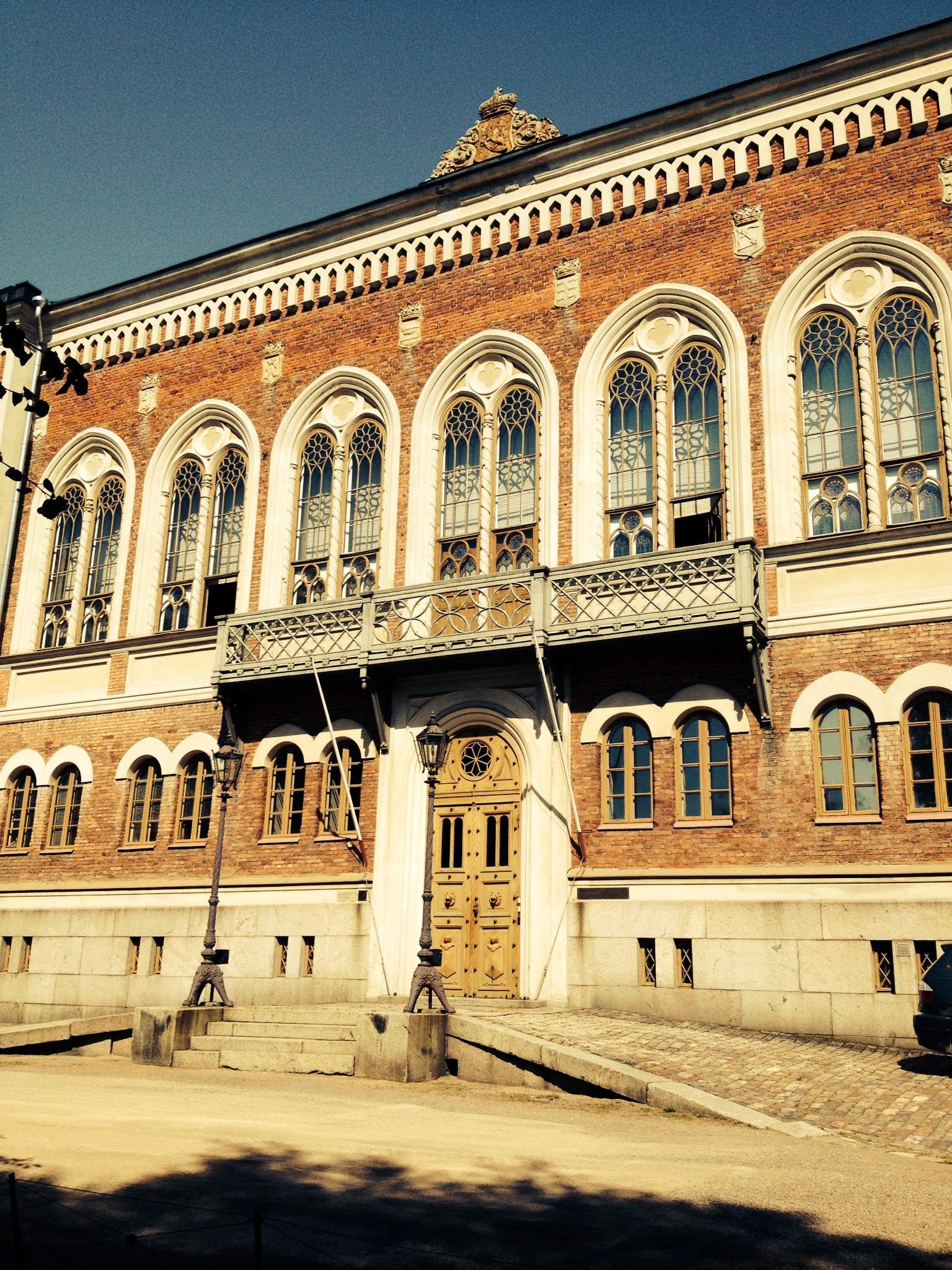
FILI premises can be found in the House of Nobility in Helsinki

== Activities ==
- FILI's core activity is awarding grants for the translation and printing of literature. Every year, a total of EUR 600,000 in translation and printing grants is being awarded for some 300 projects.
- Other promotional measures: grants, which are awarded to cover travel costs or events abroad to promote literature in translation and sample translation grants.
- residency programme for translators
- FILI participates in numerous literary events, both in Finland and abroad.
- Organisation of visits to Finland for international publishers and editors.
- FILI organises seminars and other events for translators.
- To facilitate contact among translators of Finnish literature abroad, FILI created the Kääntöpiiri online community.

== Projects ==
- FINNLAND.COOL – Finland as the Guest of Honour at the 2014 Frankfurt Book Fair:

Finland was the Guest of Honour at the 2014 Frankfurt Book Fair. FILI coordinated Finland's presence at the fair in conjunction with Finnish publishers and other literary specialists, as well as key government ministries (the Ministry of Education and Culture, the Ministry of Employment and the Economy, and the Ministry for Foreign Affairs) and cultural figures. Central to this Guest of Honour project was the sale of translation rights. FILI was also in charge of exhibitions about Finnish culture to be staged in museums and other art institutions in Frankfurt.

- Bringing Finland-Swedish literature to the world 2010–2014:

'Bringing Finland-Swedish literature to the world' was a campaign funded by Svenska Kulturfonden (The Swedish Cultural Foundation in Finland). It was also part of the Frankfurt 2014 themed project. The long-term objective of this campaign was to create sustainable structures to market Finland-Swedish literature around the world, while its short-term goal was to increase the number of Finland-Swedish books in translation.

- Bringing Finnish comics and graphic novels to the world:

FILI established its own translation and printing grant program for comics and graphic novels. FILI organizes visits for publishers of comics and graphic novels, has its own stand at the Angoulême international comics festival, and exhibits Finnish comics and graphic novels at other international book fairs.

- Bringing non-fiction books to the world:

FILI helps to promote Finnish non-fiction books abroad with translation and printing grants, by producing materials about contemporary works and by exhibiting Finnish non-fiction books at international book fairs. FILI organises visits by international publishers to Finland as well as seminars for translators of Finnish non-fiction and academic books.

- Bringing literature for children and young people to the world:

A translation and printing grant program to help bring Finnish literature for children and young people to the world. FILI provides seminars for translators of children's and young people's literature, as well as hosting visits by international publishers. FILI maintains the Kolonkolonkolo children's literature portal.

- Masterclass

In 2013, FILI piloted a new mentoring scheme for translators. This project was set up in collaboration with seven Finnish Cultural Institutes abroad. Institutes in the following locations took part in the launch phase of this 'Masterclass' project: Benelux, Berlin, Madrid, St Petersburg, Stockholm, Hungary and Estonia.

BOOKS FROM FINLAND The online magazine is the only Finnish literature magazine in English language. Books from Finland is being published by the Finnish Literature Society in association with FILI – Finnish Literature Exchange and with financial assistance from the Finnish Ministry of Education. Books from Finland is an independent journal and was founded in 1967. The magazine appeared in print until the end of 2008.

Finnish state award for foreign translators The FILI Advisory Board makes a recommendation regarding the recipient of the State Prize for Translation. The prize, worth EUR 15,000, is awarded since 1975 by the Ministry of Education and Culture.

== See also ==
- Finnish literature
- Finland-Swedish literature
