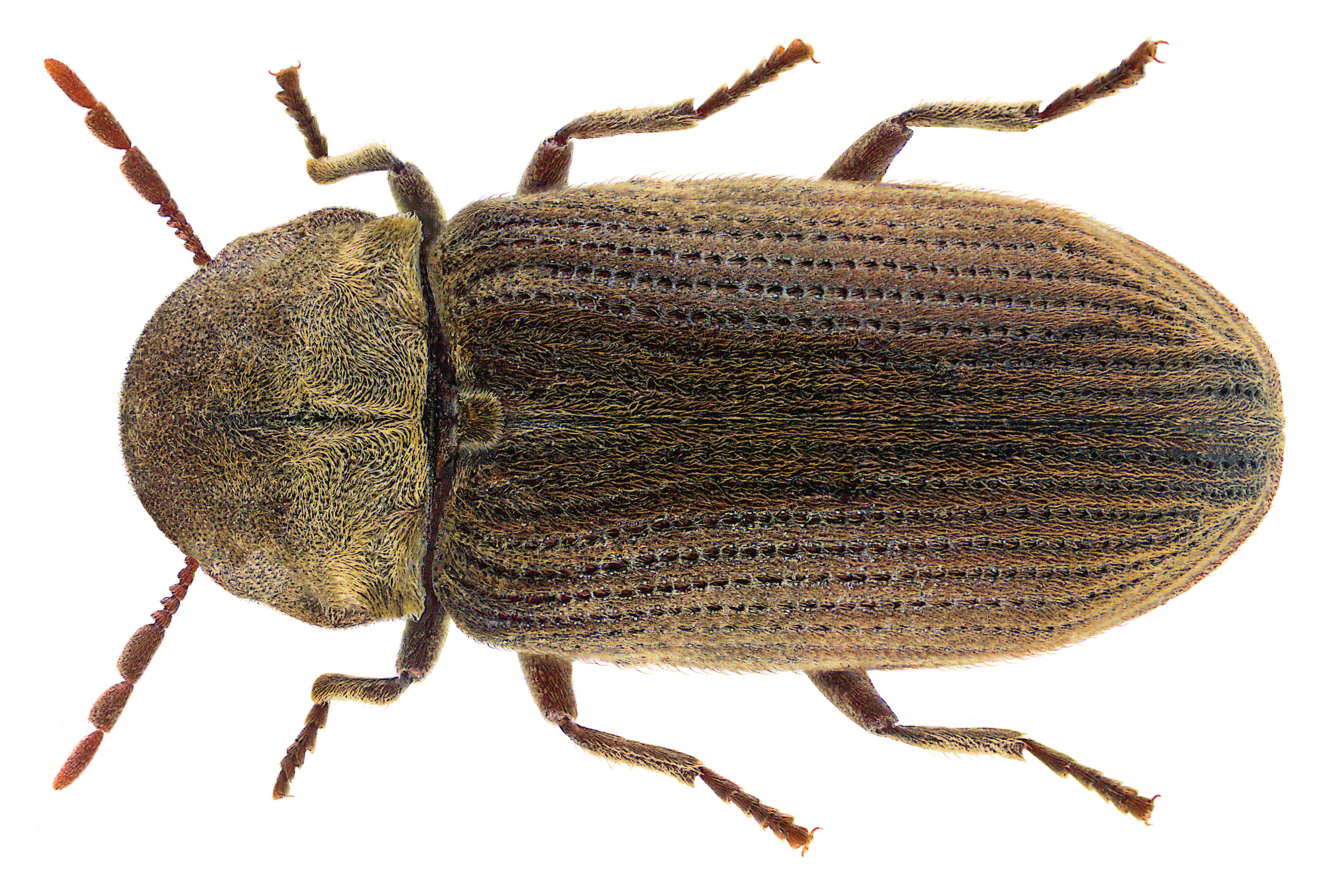

Scientific classification
- Kingdom: Animalia
- Phylum: Arthropoda
- Class: Insecta
- Order: Coleoptera
- Suborder: Polyphaga
- Family: Ptinidae
- Genus: Hadrobregmus
- Species: H. denticollis

Binomial name
- Hadrobregmus denticollis (Creutzer, 1796)

= Hadrobregmus denticollis =

Species of beetle

Hadrobregmus denticollis is a species of death-watch beetle in the family Anobiidae.
