= Napakivi =

Standing stones in Finland

Napakivi (pole/navel stone) or tonttukivi (elf stone) is a traditional Finnish name for a standing stone in the middle of a field or another central spot.

Generally speaking napakivi are unhewn stones that people have set upright. Some of them may have been erected by withdrawal of the receding ice-masses after the ice-age, in which case they will not be napakivi proper. Napakivi are usually longish and erect, and frequently have a round head. This has been interpreted by some to perhaps indicate an omphalos/penile reference symbolically. Napakivi can be located in the middle of a field, or the heart of an adjacent pile of stones which will be compiled of stones which had to be removed from the field to make it cultivatable by a plough. It can also be the central stone of a burial mound.

Napakivi may have been considered facilitators of fertility or protectors of domain, or they may have been legal indicators of ownership. It is plausible they may have been considered some kind of magical centres of force or energy accumulators; perhaps the seat of a tutelary spirit's power. The name tonttukivi refers to the elfs known as tonttu and also to the Finnish language word for a plot of land "tontti". Some stones equivalent to napakivi have been referred to with the term Juminkeko or Jumin kurikka, in which case they will have been connected to the mysterious spirit known as Jumi, who served as the basis for the Finnish word for god.

Napakivi may have some cultural connection with saami seids or central European and great British megaliths, although it has not been demonstrated with any scientific rigour. Megaliths too are erected by ancient folk, giant, usually over man high stones which are sole or in groups. Most megaliths as well are considered to have a connexion to the penis and fertility.

A stone in the center of a graveyard set up at the end of battle to inter the combatants is often called a napakivi, in which case the attendant mythology described above will not be attached to it.
