= Carl Axel Gottlund =

Finnish explorer (1796–1875)

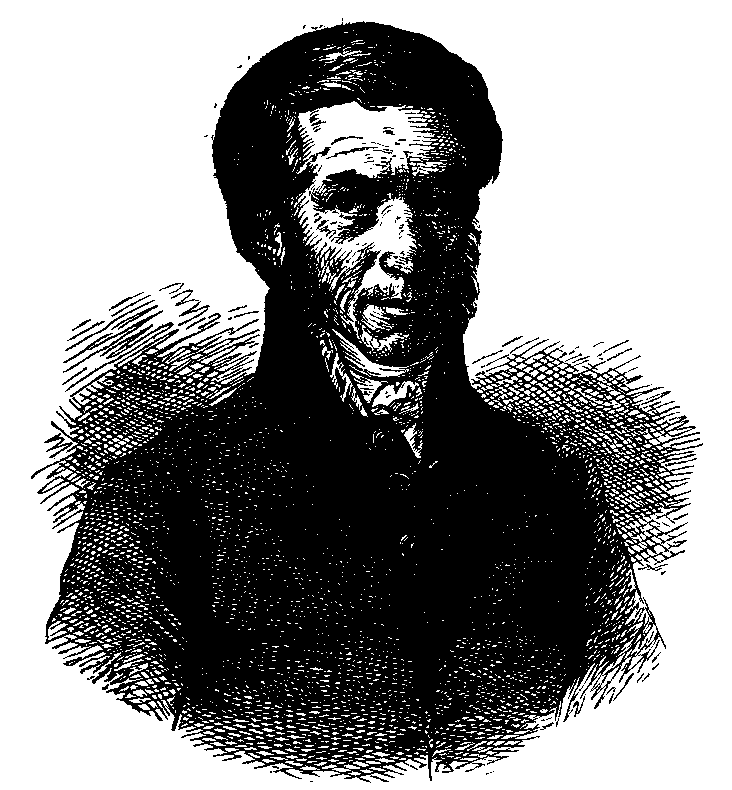
On 17 March 1876, nearly 11 months after his death, Carl Axel Gottlund was pictured in Työmiehen Ystävä, a newspaper which he had helped to operate and for which he had written.

Carl Axel Gottlund (24 February 1796 – 20 April 1875) was a Finnish explorer, collector of folklore, historian, cultural politician, linguist, philologist, translator, writer, publisher and lecturer of Finnish language at the University of Helsinki. He was a colorful cultural personality and one of the central Finnish national awakeners and — later — one of the leading dissidents at the same time.

Gottlund pursued the creation of an autonomous Finnish territory from the Finn Forests on both sides of the Swedish-Norwegian border, with great economic and political independence.

Gottlund is commonly credited with saving the folklore of the Forest Finns. Among the ideas he promoted was the view that all languages are interconnected by the same roots.

== Life ==
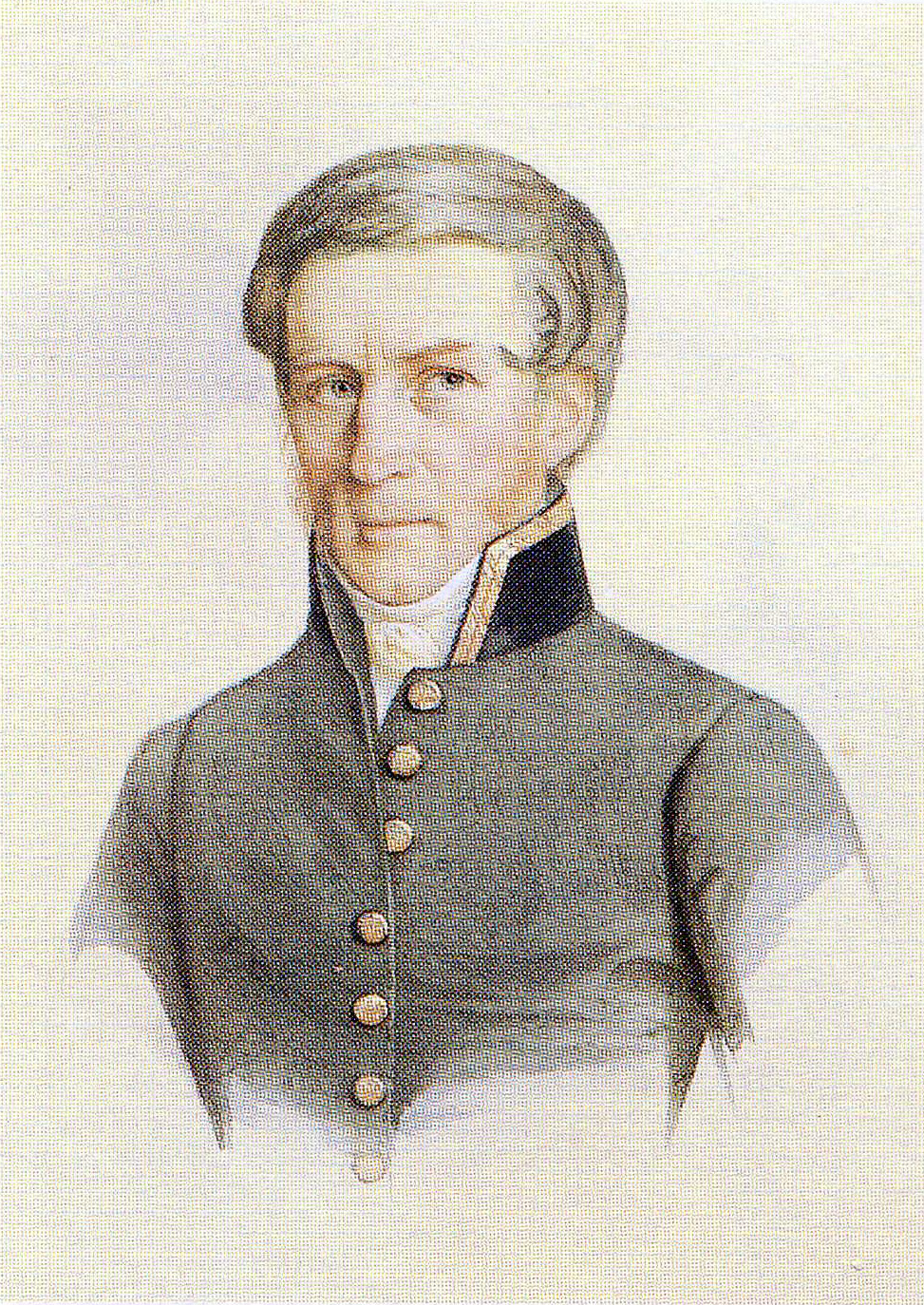
Carl Axel Gottlund (1857)

=== Early life ===
In 1796, Carl Axel Gottlund was born in the Southern Finnish coastal town of Ruotsinpyhtää into the family of a Finnish clergyman Mattias Gottlund, one of the most outstanding representatives of Enlightenment ideas in Finland. Accordingly, Carl Axel was raised in the spirit of the Enlightenment, and the basic structure of his thinking represented rationalistic Enlightenment ideals.

Gottlund's ancestry is traced back to Michel Skotte, a Scottish soldier who after fighting for Sweden in the 17th century was granted a farm in Pyhtää, Finland, marking the beginning of Gottlund's lineage.

Matthias Gottlund, Carl Axel's father, worked as the chaplain of the local congregation at the time. Carl Axel's mother Ulrika Sophia was from the upper-class family of Orraeus in the nearby town of Porvoo.

In 1805, the Gottlund family settled in Juva, in the Finnish province of Savonia, where Gottlund's father had landed a financially lucrative job as a vicar.

During his childhood years, Carl Axel Gottlund's interest towards the Finnish culture and language had been inspired by his father, to the most part. The opportunity in his childhood for Carl Axel to meet with the known Finnish nationalist author Jaakko Juteini is also believed to have boosted his future career choices and patriotism.

In 1810, Carl Axel enrolled with the Gymnasium of Porvoo, a junior college in Southern Finland. In 1814, he began studies at the Royal Academy of Turku. At the academy, he had awakening in the Finnish national romanticism.

In 1815–1816, Carl Axel collected various types of Finnish folklore material from his home county: poems, songs, spells, children's stories and plays, nursery rhymes, etc.

=== Finn Forests' autonomy in Central Scandinavia ===
In 1816, Carl Axel Gottlund began studies at the Uppsala University in Sweden. In Uppsala, Gottlund studied classical languages, natural sciences, history and philosophy.

In 1817, Gottlund made an exploration trip to the Finnish-inhabited Dalarna area of Central Sweden, to collect Finnish folklore and other ethnographic data as well as genealogical information, the latter partly because he wanted to improve the social circumstances of the Forest Finns and to prevent Sweden from taking ownership of their land. He recorded total of about 50 Finnish language poems, songs and spells during this expedition.

Soon after this, Gottlund published his first book, Pieniä runoja Suomen poijille ratoxi I ("Small Poems for the Enjoyment of Finnish Boys - Part I"), consisting of folklore which he had collected at his home county of Juva in Finland. A 'part II' was published shortly after.

In the summer of 1821, Gotlund launched another expedition to a Finnish-inhabited part of Sweden, this time covering the south-central Swedish area of Värmland. The expedition lasted until January 1822, after which Gottlund began acting as a political advocate on behalf of the Finnish population of Sweden. Among his accomplishments, Gotlund founded three congregations for the Forest Finns.

Furthermore, in 1821 starting Gottlund began pursuing the creation of an autonomous Finnish county called Fennia from the Finn Forests on both sides of the Swedish-Norwegian border, north and northeast from the modern-day Norwegian area of Oslo, with great economic and political independence. The tax border would have been removed and land ownership by Swedes and Norwegians would have been restricted. The Swedish-Norwegian border had not been properly established before 1751.

In attempts to have the Finnish population of Sweden Proper "Swedified" and assimilated into the mainstream Swedish society, the use of the Finnish language had become strictly prohibited in Sweden Proper in the mid-17th-century. However, Gottlund estimated that in the beginning of the 19th century the Central Scandinavian Finn Forests' areas which he had visited alone were still home to approximately 40,000 Finnish-speaking Finns, of whom about 14,000 lived in Värmland - this in addition to other Finns such as the Tornedalians and their descendants and the Forest Finns in other parts of Sweden and Norway. It is estimated that "one of each five Swedes has their roots amongst the Forest Finns".

Eventually - however -, due to his political activism, Gottlund nearly became expelled from Sweden. He was banned from operating in Stockholm, and - amidst his lobbying and campaigning - he was finally exiled from Stockholm to Uppsala. In spite of this total political failure in the creation of the Central Scandinavian autonomous Finnish area, Gottlund had positive cultural influence on the Forest Finns and became a legendary, heroic character in the Finn Forests.

While still living in Uppsala and while attending the Uppsala University part-time, Gottlund began preparing an ambitious publication, Otava, aimed to become a Finnish literary monument. Otava was published in three parts between 1828 and 1832. It consisted of articles pertaining to linguistics, history, ethics, religion, folklore and poetry.

However, in Finland, Otava was not met with the type of enthusiasm which Gottlund had hoped for. The work was considered to favor too much the Savonian dialects of Finnish language, and its mainly enlightenment-spirited contents were overshadowed by the current of romanticism which now had encaptured Finland, producing epics such as The Kalevala in 1835 and The Tales of Ensign Stål in 1848.

In 1831, Gottlund married Charlotta Augusta Brink. Over time, the two gave birth to total of 10 children together.

=== Returning to Finland ===
In 1834, Gottlund returned to Finland, bringing his family along. The family settled in Kuopio, where Gottlund's now widowed mother lived.

In 1839, Gottlund became a lecturer of Finnish language in the University of Helsinki, which then was known as the Imperial Alexander University of Finland (from 1828 to 1919).

In 1842, Gottlund was granted a permission to launch a printing house in Helsinki, the opening of which was delayed until a few years later.

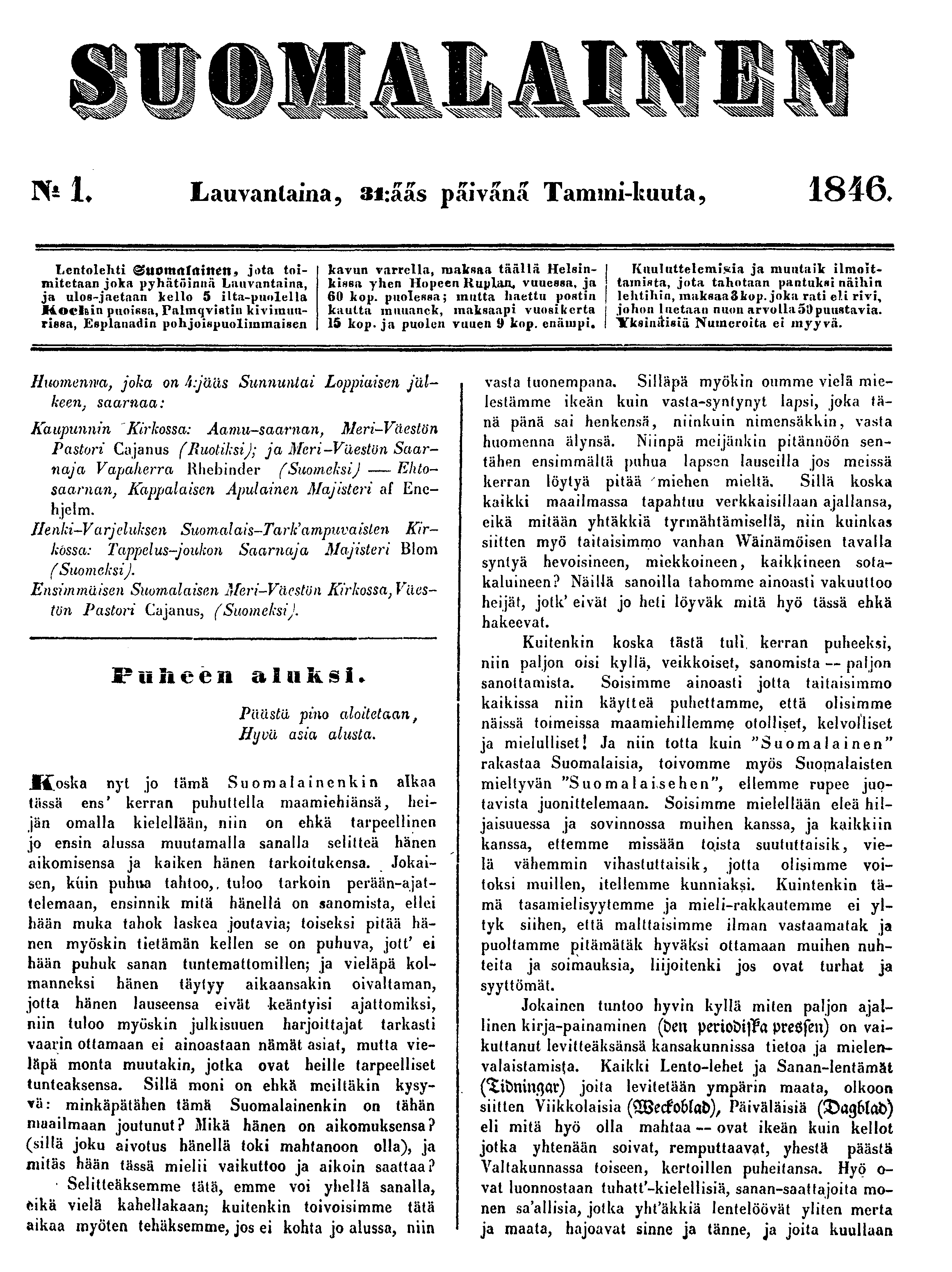
The first number of the Suomalainen newspaper, published by Carl Axel Gottlund in Finnish, beginning on 31 January 1846.

In 1846, Gottlund published a poetic album named Sampo. The same year, in 1846, Gottlund founded the Suomalainen newspaper, which was printed in Finnish. Following the publication of a certain polemic article in the paper, the Finnish Senate discontinued the publishing of the paper. However, Gottlund came up with another similar newspaper, Suomi, which was in circulation from 1847 to 1849.

=== Battle for professorship ===
In 1850, Gottlund sought the professorship of Finnish language at the University of Helsinki. However, Gottlund was found unqualified for the job, following his doctoral thesis - written in Finnish - becoming confiscated, after Gottlund had prematurely published it against the approval of the government-guided censorship. M. A. Castrén was elected for the job. However, he died already a year later. Gottlund now ran for the job against the famed Finnish author Elias Lönnrot. This time Gottlund's doctoral thesis was written in Swedish, but - for the second time - it was disapproved.

Through his life, Gottlund was passionately interested in archaeology, about which he wrote e.g. in his Otava series. In the 1850s, he continued exploring the history and culture of the Finnish people. In 1859, Gottlund received a grant from the Senate of Finland to sponsor his archaeological expeditions in various parts of Finland. He promoted the establishment of the professorship of archaeology in Finland, to no avail.

Following the retirement of Elias Lönnrot as the Professor of Finnish language in Helsinki, in 1862, Gottlund's doctoral thesis was finally approved, but again that professorship which he had sought was given to another candidate,

In the 1860s, Gottlund continued writing and publishing actively. In 1865, he published Läsning för finnar, in which he criticizes his adversaries and discusses the injustices which he had had to experience on his academic career. Among his other accomplishments in the 1860s, Gottlund translated the poetry of the Swedish Carl Michael Bellman into Finnish.

Gottlund sought financial backing from Norway, Sweden and Finland for further publications relating to the Forest Finns of Norway and Sweden, to no prevail. In the 1870s, Gottlund participated in publishing of the Työmiehen Ystävä ("Friend of the Working Man") newspaper, for which he also wrote.

== Banned folklore ==
Some of the folklore poetry collected by Gottlund in the early 19th century was considered sexually too explicit to be published during his lifetime, and even until quite recently. Some poems collected by him stayed archived until 1997, when they became included in the book Suomen Kansan Vanhat Runot ("Old Poems of the Finnish People").

== Publications ==
=== In Finnish ===
- C. M. Fredmanin lauluja ja loiluja (K. E. Holm 1863)
- Jumalasta ja hänen monenaisista nimittämisestä moailman erinäisillä kielillä (1850)
- Niillä Norin rajoille asuwille suomalaisille (1822)
- Nyt ja ennen (1846)
- Otava eli suomalaisia huvituksia 1–2 (1828–1832)
- Otava eli suomalaisia huvituksia 3 (Suomalaisen Kirjallisuuden Seura 1929)
- Pieniä runoja Suomen poijille ratoxi 1–2 (1818–1821)
- Runola (1840)
- Ruotsin suomalaismetsiä samoilemassa (Suomalaisen Kirjallisuuden Seura 1928)
- Sampo (1847)
- Suomalaisia paimen-soittoja (1828?)
- Suomenmoa (1846)
- Suomesta poislähtyäni (1846)
- Suomi (1845)
- Uusia suomalaisia lauluja (1845–1846)
- Wanha koarlolainen, Kyrön tappeluksesta (1846)
- Vermlannin päiväkirja 1821 (Suomalaisen Kirjallisuuden Seura 1986)
- Väinämöiset (1828)

=== In Swedish and Latin ===
- Allmogens uti Savolax och Karelen Finska Familjenamn (1872)
- Anmälan (1825)
- Carl Axel Gottlunds förteckning över familjenamnen på de svenska och norska finnskogarna (Veidarvon 2003)
- Carl Axel Gottlunds värmlandsbrev (1821–1823) (1925)
- Dagbok öfver dess resor på finnskogarne i Dalarne, Helsingland, Vestmanland och Vermland år 1817 (Nordisk rotogravyr 1931)
- Dagbok över mina vandringar på Wermlands och Solörs finnskogar 1821 (Gruetunet museum, 1986)
- De proverbiis Fennicis (1818)
- Den finska Sampo-myten, närmare uttyd och förklarad (1872)
- Forskningar uti sjelfva grund-elementerna af det finska språkets grammatik, efter föregående anmärkningar om språket i allmänhet (Frenckell 1863)
- Försök att förklara Caj. Corn. Taciti omdömen öfver finnarne (1834)
- Försök att förklara de finska stamordens uppkomst (1853)
- Förteckning öfver en manuskriptsamling (Minervas bokhandel 1897)
- Gud, Herlden, och Menniskan (1870)
- Karl Ax. Gottlunds och J. Boëthii brev om finnmarkerna i Dalarna och Bergslagen (1928)
- Läsning för finnar (1864)
- Något som torde förtjena att reflekteras uppå, och att vid nu påstående Landtdag närmare skärskådas och öfvervägas (1872)
- Några historiska notiser om den i Finland forndom så celebra familjen Kurck (Simelius 1862)
- Näsperlan, såsom en pendant till Flugsmällan (1868)
- Slutord i polemiken med herrarne B. O. Schauman och magister Aug. Schauman (1867)
- Ur Carl Axel Gottlunds dagboksanteckningar från en resa genom Värmlands finnmarker år 1821 (Värmlands fornminnes- och museiförening 1931–1933)
- Utdrag af preste-ståndets protocoll af d. 3 Martii 1823 (1823)
- Vid Erik Forsbloms graf (1851)

== See also ==
- Day of Sweden Finns

== Sources ==
- Fennica - Finnish National Biography.
- Helka - Archives of the University of Helsinki.
- Pulkkinen, Risto 2003: Vastavirtaan: C.A. Gottlund 1800-luvun suomalaisena toisinajattelijana: psykobiografinen tutkimus. Theses. University of Helsinki, Department of Theology.
- Pulkkinen, Risto: Carl Axel Gottlund. (Finnish National Biography)
- C. A. Gottlund: Ruotsin suomalaismetsiä samoilemassa - Suomalaisen Kirjallisuuden Seura, 1928.
- Finnkulturcentrum.com - Center of Finnish Culture.
- Fennia - a portal pertaining to the Forest Finns.
