= Sami Kieksi =

Finnish documentary filmmaker (born 1990)

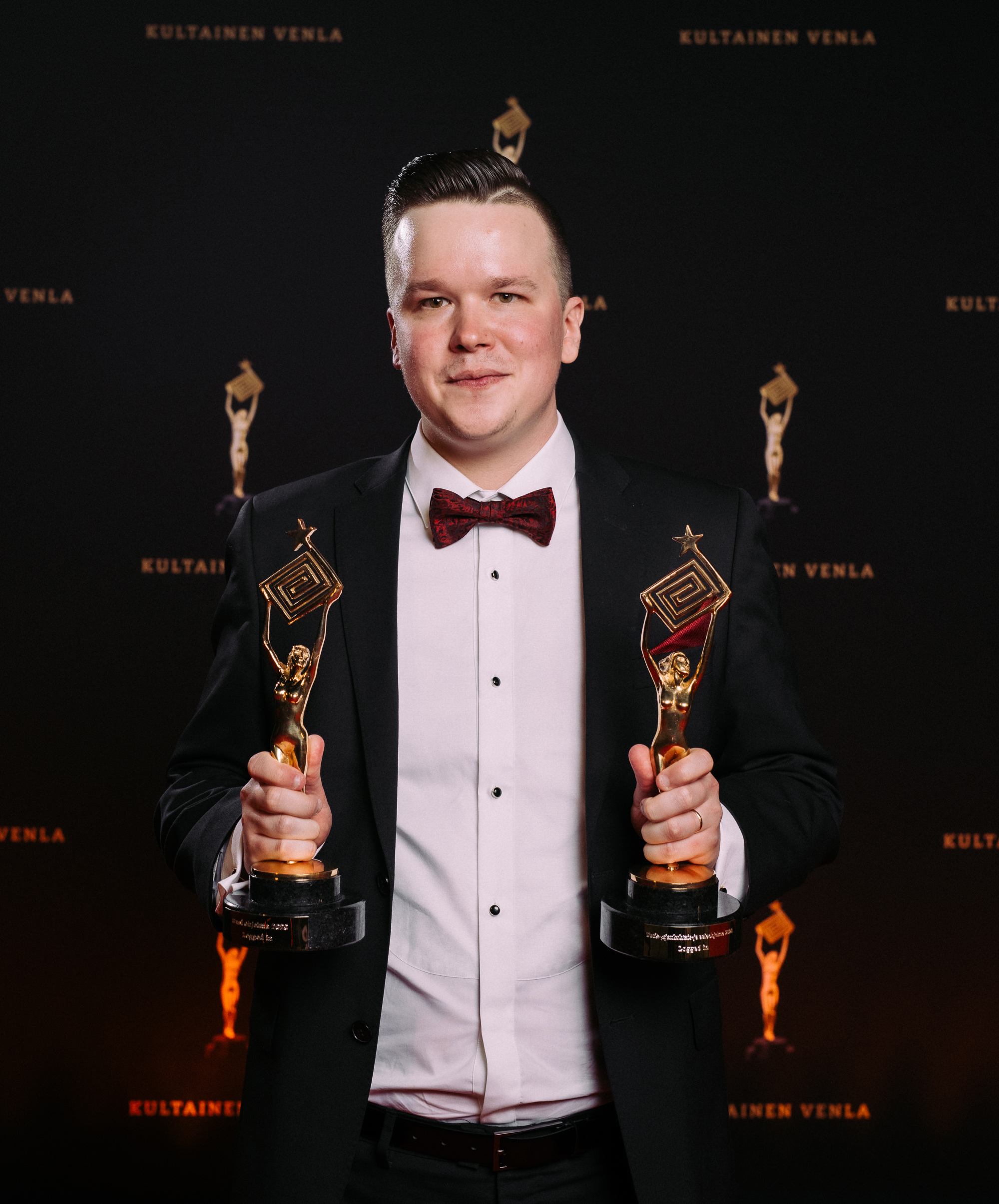
- Kieksi at the Golden Venla Awards, 2020
- Born: 1990 (age 35–36); Finspång, Sweden
- Occupations: Director; producer; screenwriter
- Years active: 2016–present
- Notable work: Logged In; Most Wanted: Teen Hacker
- Awards: Golden Venla (2020)

Sami Tapani Kieksi (born 1990) is a Finnish producer, director, and screenwriter. He is best known documentary series, including Logged In (2020) and Veitola.doc (2022–2023). Kieksi has been recognized with several national awards in Finland, including the prestigious Golden Venla. In September 2021, he received the State Award for Public Information, granted by the Finnish Ministry of Education and Culture.

== Early life ==
Kieksi was born in 1990. He grew up in the Torne Valley in Norbotten, and comes from a Sweden Finn background. He characterized his childhood as challenging, and was exposed to violence, substance abuse, mental health problems, and neglect. He noted that many of the young protagonists in his documentaries come from similarly fractured backgrounds.

== Career ==
Before his directing career, Kieksi worked as a stage actor at the Tampere Theatre and the Tampere Workers' Theatre between 2009 and 2010.

Kieksi first gained national attention with the documentary series Some Deep Story, which premiered on Yle Areena in August 2016. The series explores themes of loneliness, bullying, and poverty among Finnish youth.

In 2020, Kieksi directed and produced Logged In, a five-part documentary series for Yleisradio (Yle), which follows five young Finnish men who turn to online gaming as a means of coping with everyday challenges. The series generated significant public discussion in Finland, particularly around topics such as social exclusion, youth mental health, and digital identity. Kieksi has expressed a desire to avoid using the term “marginalized,” instead aiming to portray individuals through their own lived experiences.

In 2025, Yleisradio (Yle), released KIEKSI – Look Where You Cannot See, a six-episode documentary series named after Kieksi. The series examines contemporary social issues through the lens of Finnish youth, blending personal narratives with broader societal commentary.

On September 5, 2025, HBO Max will premiere Most Wanted: Teen Hacker, an international four-part documentary series written and directed by Kieksi. The series recounts the true story of a Finnish teenager, Aleksanteri Kivimäki, who was once named by the FBI as one of the most dangerous hackers in the world.

== Filmmaking credits ==
Year(s)	Title	Episodes	Role	Publisher
2016–2022	Some Deep Story	25	Producer, director, writer	Yleisradio
2020	Logged In	5	Producer, director, writer	Yleisradio
2020	Toimettomat	5	Producer, director, writer	Yleisradio
2021	Pilluralli – itsenäistymisen vuosi	3	Producer, director, writer	Yleisradio
2021	Peter Nygård: Behind the Mask	4	Director, writer	Discovery+
2021	On Hold	4	Producer, director, writer	Yleisradio
2022	Tapaus Aarnio	4	Director, writer	Discovery+
2022	Logged In Special	1	Producer, director, writer	Yleisradio
2022–2023	Veitola.doc	4	Director, writer	MTV3
2023	Matti Nykänen – Elämä on laiffii	6	Producer, director, writer	MTV3
2024	Tsunami – Return to Paradise	4	Director, writer	Nelonen
2024	Homeless – The Long Way Home	5	Producer, writer	Yleisradio
2025	KIEKSI – Look Where You Cannot See	6	Producer, director, writer	Yleisradio
2025	Most Wanted: Teen Hacker	4	Director, writer	HBO Max

== Awards ==
- Golden Venla Awards (2020): Logged In – Best Current Affairs Programme and Best New Programme
- State Award for Public Information (2021): For amplifying the voices of marginalized people through documentary storytelling.
