= Hadrobregmus quadrulus =

Scientific classification
- Kingdom: Animalia
- Phylum: Arthropoda
- Class: Insecta
- Order: Coleoptera
- Suborder: Polyphaga
- Family: Ptinidae
- Genus: Hadrobregmus
- Species: H. quadrulus

Binomial name
- Hadrobregmus quadrulus (LeConte, 1859)

Species of beetle

Hadrobregmus quadrulus is a species in the family Ptinidae ("death-watch and spider beetles"), in the order Coleoptera ("beetles"). Hadrobregmus quadrulus is found in North America.
