= Helsinki Treaty =

1962 treaty between Nordic countries

Treaty of Co-operation between Denmark, Finland, Iceland, Norway and Sweden
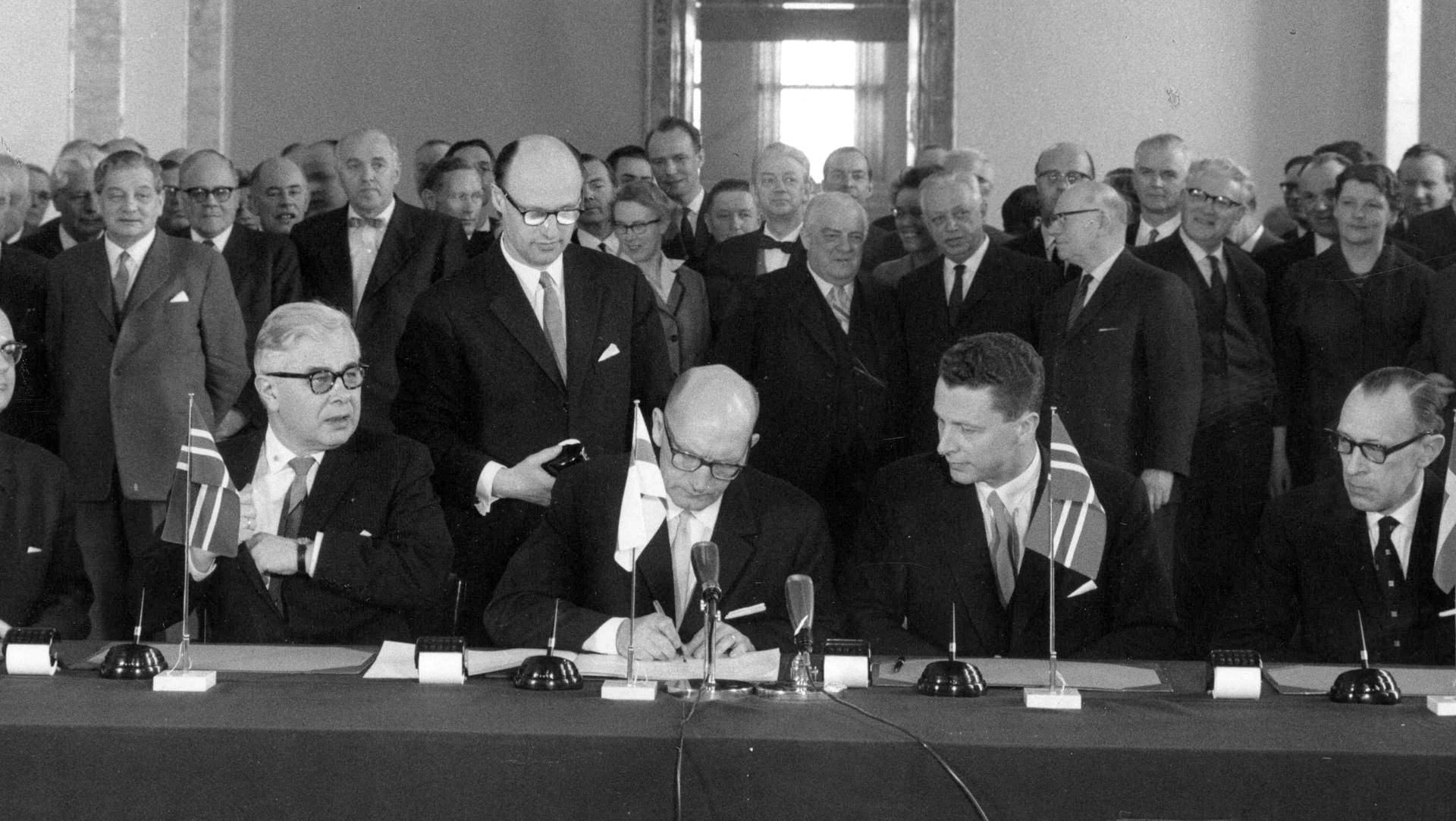
- The signing of the Helsinki Treaty. From the left: Iceland's Minister of Justice Bjarni Benediktsson, Finnish Prime Minister Martti Miettunen, Norwegian Minister of Education Helge Sivertsen and Swedish Minister of Justice Herman Kling.
- Signed: 23 March 1962; 64 years ago
- Location: Helsinki, Finland
- Effective: 1 July 1962; 63 years ago
- Parties: Denmark; Finland; Iceland; Norway; Sweden

The Helsinki Treaty on cooperation between Denmark, Finland, Iceland, Norway and Sweden set the framework for Nordic cooperation in the Nordic Council and the Nordic Council of Ministers. The Treaty was signed on 23 March 1962 and entered into force on 1 July 1962. It was amended in 1971, 1974, 1983, 1985, 1991, and 1995. The most recent amendments entered into force on 2 January 1996.

The preamble to the agreement states, among other things, that the Nordic countries:

- will promote the close community that exists between the Nordic peoples in culture as well as in law and society.
- aims to implement uniform laws in the Nordic countries in as many ways as possible.
- wishes to renew and develop Nordic cooperation in the light of the Nordic countries' increased participation in European cooperation.
