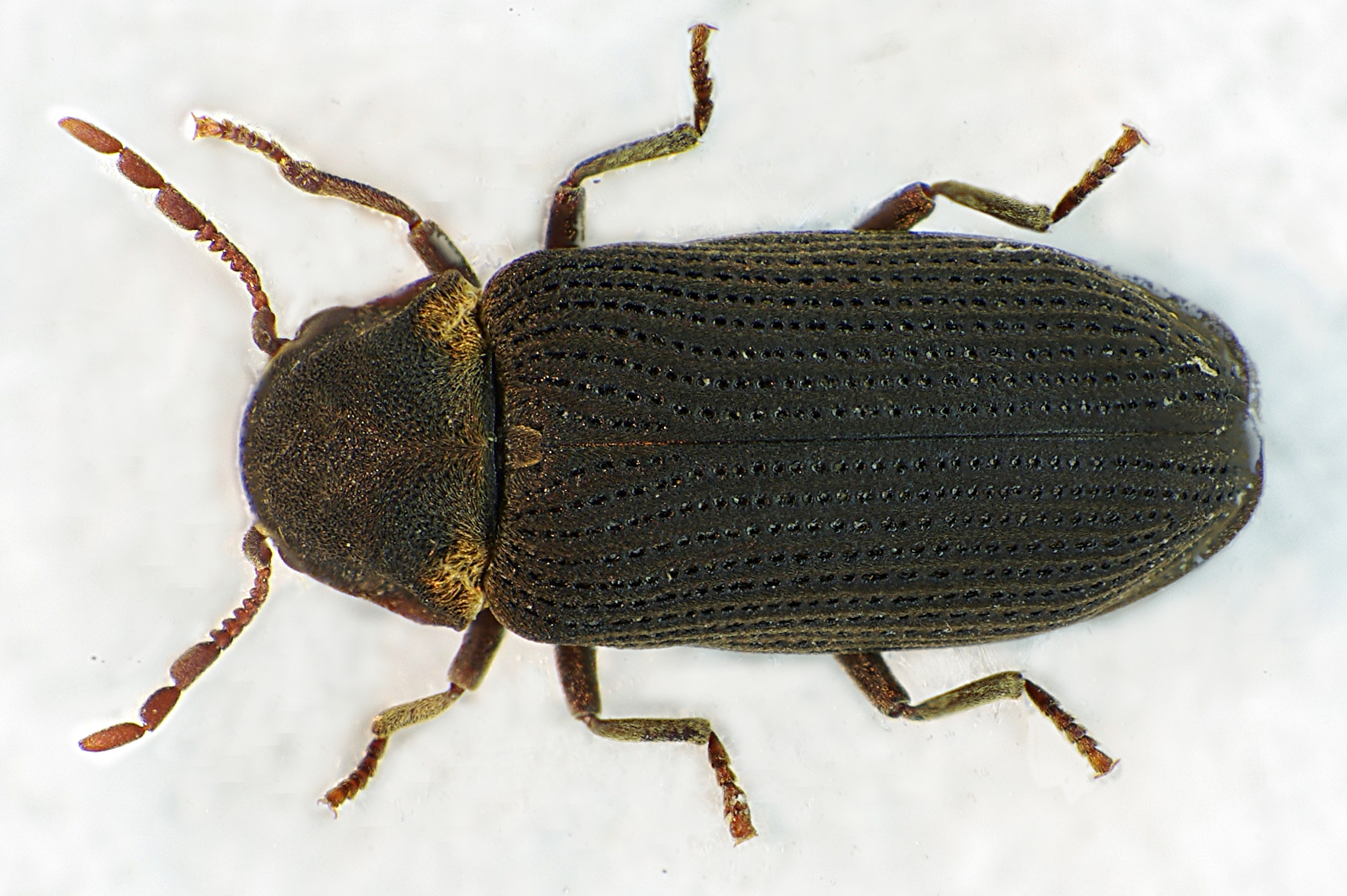
- Hadrobregmus pertinax

Scientific classification
- Kingdom: Animalia
- Phylum: Arthropoda
- Class: Insecta
- Order: Coleoptera
- Suborder: Polyphaga
- Family: Ptinidae
- Subfamily: Anobiinae
- Tribe: Hadrobregmini
- Genus: Hadrobregmus; Thomson, 1859

Species
- See text

= Hadrobregmus =

Genus of beetles

Hadrobregmus is a genus of beetles in the family Ptinidae.

Species include:

- Hadrobregmus alternatus
- Hadrobregmus americanus
- Hadrobregmus bicolor
- Hadrobregmus carpetanus
- Hadrobregmus confusus
- Hadrobregmus denticollis (Creutzer in Panzer, 1796)
- Hadrobregmus notatus
- Hadrobregmus pertinax Linnaeus, 1758
- Hadrobregmus quadrulus
- Hadrobregmus truncatus
