= Nordic Council of Ministers =

Intergovernmental forum of the Nordic countries

Nordic Council of Ministers: Nordisk Ministerråd (Danish); Nordisk ministerråd (Norwegian); Nordiska ministerrådet (Swedish); Pohjoismaiden ministerineuvosto (Finnish); Norræna ráðherranefndin (Icelandic); Norðurlendska ráðharraráðið (Faroese); Nunani Avannarlerni Naalakkersuisut Siunnersuisoqatigiivi (Greenlandic); Davviriikkaid ministarráđđi (Northern Sami)
- Flag

- Member states shown in dark blue; and regions of member states shown in light blue.
- Headquarter: (Denmark) Copenhagen
- Official languages: Danish; Finnish; Icelandic; Norwegian; Swedish
- Type: Intergovernmental organisation
- Membership: Denmark; Finland; Iceland; Norway; Sweden

Leaders
  - Secretary-General: (Denmark) Karen Ellemann
  - Presidency of the Nordic Council of Ministers: Norway

Establishment
  - Inauguration of the Nordic Council: 12 February 1953
  - Helsinki Treaty: 1 July 1962
  - Inauguration of the Nordic Council of Ministers: July 1971

Population
  - 2018 estimate: 27,210,000
- Currency: (Denmark) Danish krone; (Finland) Euro; (Iceland) Icelandic króna; (Norway) Norwegian krone; (Sweden) Swedish krona
- Website norden.org

The Nordic Council of Ministers is an intergovernmental forum established after the Helsinki Treaty. The purpose of the Nordic Council of Ministers is to complement the Nordic Council and promote Nordic cooperation.

In 2025, the Nordic Council was designated as an 'undesirable organization' in Russia.

== Structure ==
The governments of the Nordic countries each have a Minister for Nordic Cooperation. This responsibility often goes to the Minister of Foreign Affairs or another ministerial post that the Nordic country has a special desire for cooperation. These ministers for Nordic Cooperation delegate meetings for other ministers to discuss avenues for cooperation in the ministers' respective fields, thus the Ministers for Cooperation set up Ministerial Councils. Hence the name, Council of Ministers.

Short Code:	Nordic Council of ministers for:
MR-SAM	Cooperation
MR-A	Labour
MR-VÆKST	Sustainable Growth
MR-FJLS	Fisheries, Aquaculture, Agriculture, Food and Forestry
MR-JÄM	Gender Equality
MR-K	Culture
MR-LAG	Legislative Affairs
MR-MK	Environment and Climate
MR-S	Health and Social Affairs
MR-U	Education and Research
MR-FINANS	Finance
MR-DIGITAL	Digitalisation 2017–2020

== Cooperation with other international organisations ==
The Council and the Council of Ministers are involved in various forms of cooperation with neighbouring areas, amongst them being the Baltic Assembly and the Benelux, as well as Russia and Schleswig-Holstein. The Council of Ministers has offices in the following countries:

Estonia	Tallinn (Head office); Tartu (Branch office); Narva (Branch office)
Latvia	Riga
Lithuania	Vilnius

Closed offices

Russia	St. Petersburg (Office); Kaliningrad (Office); Petrozavodsk (Contact center); Arkhangelsk (Contact center); Murmansk (Information center)

== Programmes ==
Nordic Council of Ministers's educational programme for lifelong learning is "Nordplus". The main objective of the programme is to strengthen and develop Nordic educational cooperation.

== See also ==
- Valhalla (youth portal)
