= Finnish Literature Society =

Historical Finnish literary society

- Suomalaisen Kirjallisuuden Seura
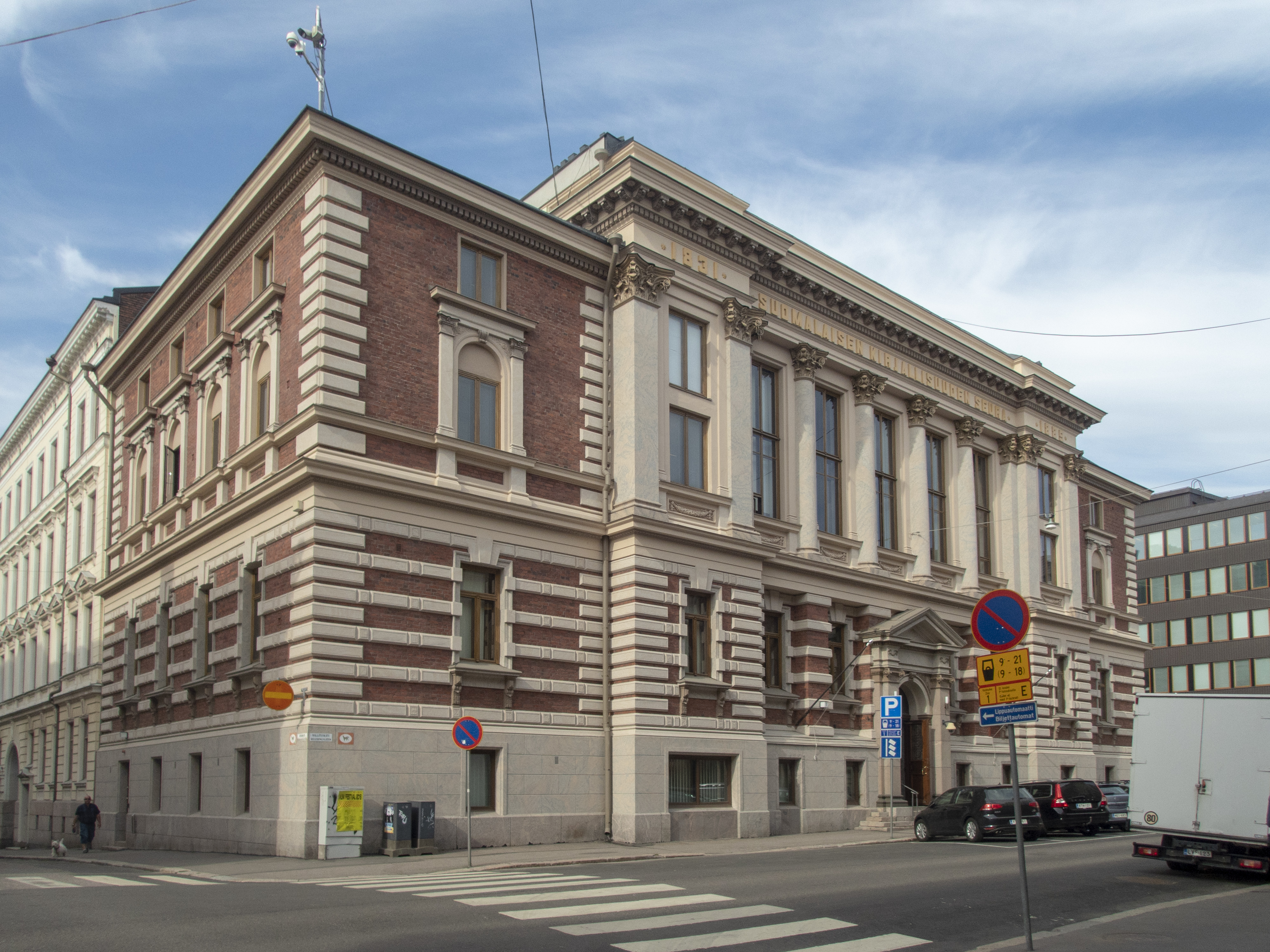
- Facade of the society's headquarters
- Abbreviation: SKS
- Formation: 1831; 195 years ago
- Type: Nonprofit
- Purpose: Memory institution, cultural institution
- Headquarters: Helsinki
- Fields: Folklore, language, literature

The Finnish Literature Society (Finnish: Suomalaisen Kirjallisuuden Seura ry or Finnish: SKS) was founded in 1831 to promote literature written in Finnish. Among its first publications was the Kalevala, the Finnish national epic.

The society is the oldest Finnish publisher still in operation and publishes general non-fiction books including folklore, literature and history.

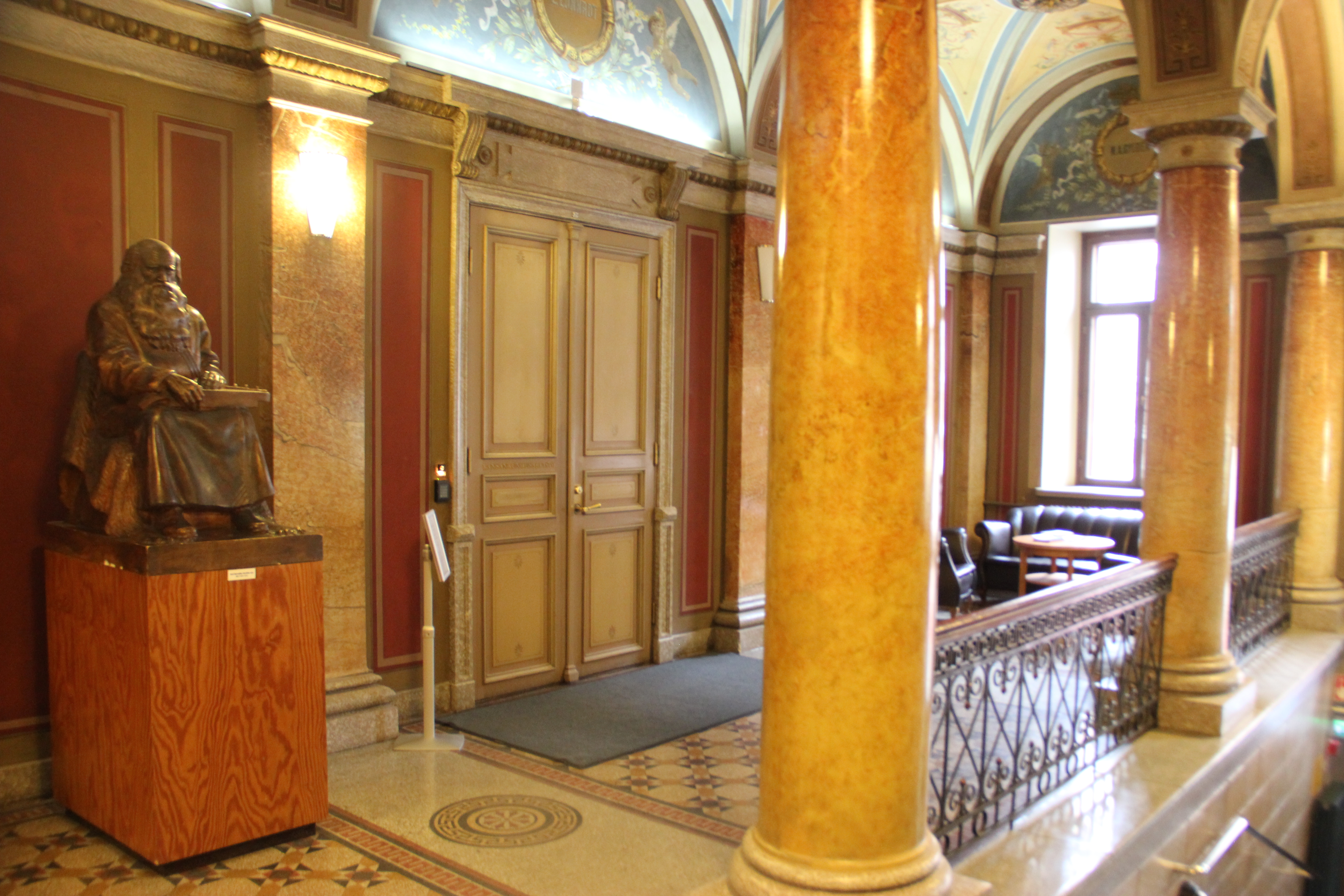
The entrance hall colonnade.

== Present Day ==
In 2024, the SKS has just over 2,000 members; membership fees range from 20-35 euros per year.

The SKS research library is open to the public.

FILI, the Finnish Literature Exchange, which aims to promote Finnish literature internationally, is part of the Finnish Literature Society.

== See also ==
- Estonian Learned Society
- Latvian Literary Society
- Lithuanian Literary Society
- Suomen kansallisbiografia (National Biography of Finland), published by the Finnish Literature Society
