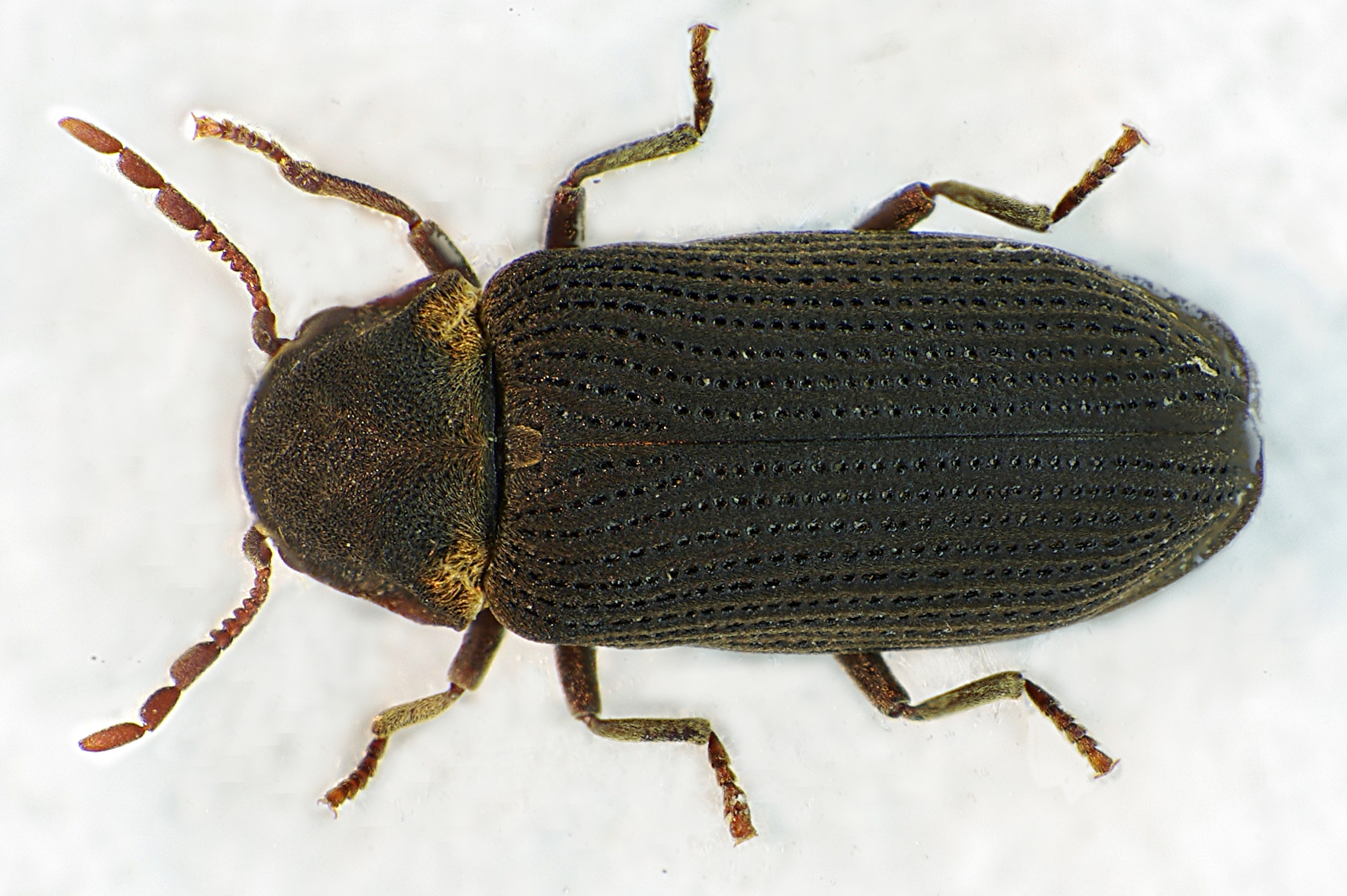

Scientific classification
- Kingdom: Animalia
- Phylum: Arthropoda
- Class: Insecta
- Order: Coleoptera
- Suborder: Polyphaga
- Family: Ptinidae
- Genus: Hadrobregmus
- Species: H. pertinax

Binomial name
- Hadrobregmus pertinax (Linnaeus, 1758)

= Hadrobregmus pertinax =

Species of beetle

Hadrobregmus pertinax is a species of woodboring beetle within the genus Hadrobregmus of the family Ptinidae. The adult is black, with yellow hairs at the back corners of its head, and is 4–5 mm long. The larva is white, about 5 mm long, and lives in decaying wood. The larval stage lasts many years. The Finnish name is "kuolemankello", literally the "clock of death", which comes from the sound resembling the ticking of a clock, made by the male striking its head against the surface of the wood in order to attract a mate. It is the most destructive insect of buildings in Finland, where it survives the long winters in below-freezing temperatures. Because the larva lives in decaying wood, its presence indicates moisture damage. Resolution of the moisture problem will cause the beetle to leave.

== See also ==
- Death watch beetle
- Priest killer
