= Minister for Nordic Cooperation =

Minister for Nordic Cooperation may refer to:

- Minister for Nordic Cooperation (Denmark)
- Minister for Nordic Cooperation (Finland)
- Minister for Nordic Cooperation (Iceland)
- Minister of Nordic Cooperation (Norway)
- Minister for Nordic Cooperation (Sweden)
