= The Nordic Institute in Finland =

Cultural institution in Finland

The Nordic Institute in Finland (NIFIN) is a Nordic cultural institute under the aegis of the Nordic Council of Ministers located in Helsinki. Nifin aims to provide people in Finland with knowledge about the other Nordic countries’ languages and cultures. The institute also aims to spread knowledge about the Finnish language and culture to the other Nordic countries. In collaboration with the other Nordic Houses and Institutes, Nifin also coordinates cultural co-operation with the neighbours in the Baltic countries and North-West Russia.

Nifin runs a special Nordic library that has approximately 16,000 titles. The collection comprises modern fiction as well as non-fiction and audiovisual materials. The library is open to the public.

The Institute organises cultural events, such as meetings with authors, exhibitions and lectures on Nordic issues, and has an extensive co-operation with other organisations and cultural institutions. Nifin also organises seminars and language courses and publishes material about the Nordic countries and their languages both on the Internet and as printed materials.

The institute is involved in a number of outward-directed activities, especially in relation to schools and educational institutions in Finland.

Nifin was founded in 1997. It is located in the centre of Helsinki on Kaisaniemenkatu in the premises of Nordic Investment Bank.
