= Forest Finns =

Subgroup of the Finnish people

metsäsuomalaiset (Finnish) skogfinner / skogfinnar (Norwegian) skogsfinnar (Swedish)
- Official cultural flag (since 2022)

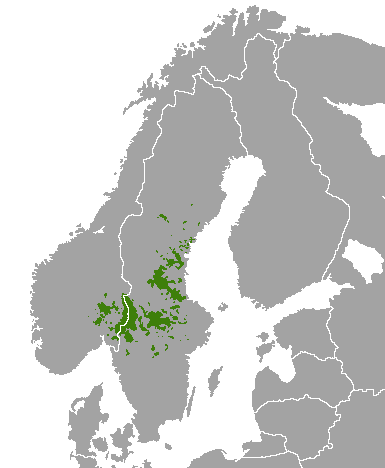
- Map of areas settled by Forest Finns.

Total population
- Unknown

Regions with significant populations
- Norway and Sweden

Languages
- Historically Finnish (Värmland Savonian); Now Norwegian and Swedish

Religion
- Christianity (Lutheranism)

Related ethnic groups
- Finns

Forest Finns (Finnish: metsäsuomalaiset, Norwegian bokmål: skogfinner, Norwegian nynorsk: skogfinnar, Swedish: skogsfinnar) were Finnish migrants from Savonia and Northern Tavastia in Finland who settled in forest areas of Sweden proper and Norway during the late 16th and early-to-mid-17th centuries, and traditionally pursued slash-and-burn agriculture, a method used for turning forests into farmlands. By the late 18th century, the Forest Finns had become largely assimilated into the Swedish and Norwegian cultures, and their language, a variety of Savonian Finnish (Värmland Savonian dialect), is today extinct, although it survived among a tiny minority until the 20th century. Descendants of the Forest Finns still live in Sweden and Norway.

== Etymology ==
The use of the term "Forest Finns" is first reported in sanctions issued by the Dano-Norwegian king in 1648, although they (at least locally in Norway) more commonly were known as Savolaksfinner (Savonian Finns), Rugfinner (Rye Finns) from their major crop, or notably Svedjefinner (Slash-and-burn Finns). The people themselves often used the term Finnskoginger (People from the forest of Finns).

== History ==
Painting by Eero Järnefelt showing forest burning

The origin of the Forest Finns lies in border skirmishes since the 13th century. The powers to the east of Finland, Novgorod and later Russia, constantly challenged the Swedish sovereignty of the often sparsely populated provinces of Eastern Finland. To secure their realm, the Swedish kings, notably Gustav Vasa (r. 1523–1560) and Eric XIV (r. 1560–1568), encouraged farmers to settle these vast wilderness regions, which in turn were used to the traditionally slash-and-burn agriculture.

These settlements faced several problems, from conflicts with the original populations of Sami people and Karelians to harsh conditions living in frontier lands during war times. The fact that slash-and-burn itself requires a relatively low human population density or a continuing supply of new "frontier" lands, also caused overpopulation and by the late 16th century forced migration by Forest Finns from Savonia (Swedish: Savolax) and Northern Häme (Tavastland).

The main part of the Forest Finns moved north to Ostrobothnia (Österbotten) and Kainuu (Kajanaland), east towards northern Karelia (Karelen), and south towards Ingria (Ingermanland) (part of Sweden at the time, now part of Russia). However, an estimated 10–15% went westbound across the Baltic Sea in search of largely uninhabited lands best fit for their needs.

The first Forest Finns' settlements in Sweden Proper were established in Norrland, in the provinces of Gästrikland, Ångermanland and Hälsingland in the 1580s and 1590s. Another migration route started from Medelpad and continued through the early 17th century on crown lands in the provinces of Dalarna, Värmland and Dalsland, among others, to occupy the areas immediately adjacent to the border with Denmark–Norway.

Eventually, from the 1620s on, the Forest Finns began settling to Norway. There, they settled in the Eastern counties of Hedmark, Oppland, Akershus, Oslo and Buskerud. The largest concentration of settlements, however, was in the forest-rich eastern part of Hedmark, close to the border of Sweden, in what today is denoted as Finnskogen in Norwegian and Finnskog[arna] in Swedish (literally "Finn Forest[s]"). In this rather remote region the Forest Finns were able to move back and forth between the two countries. The border was not properly established until 1751.

In April 1823, six Swedish and six Norwegian Forest Finns traveled to the capital Stockholm in what was called "Tolvmannamarsjen" (English: The march of the twelve men). They brought a petition with 600 signatures demanding their own common church congregation (Kirkesogn) with a Finnish speaking priest right on the Norway-Sweden border. The twelve men were given an audience before King Charles XIV John on 4 May.

== Contemporary acceptance ==
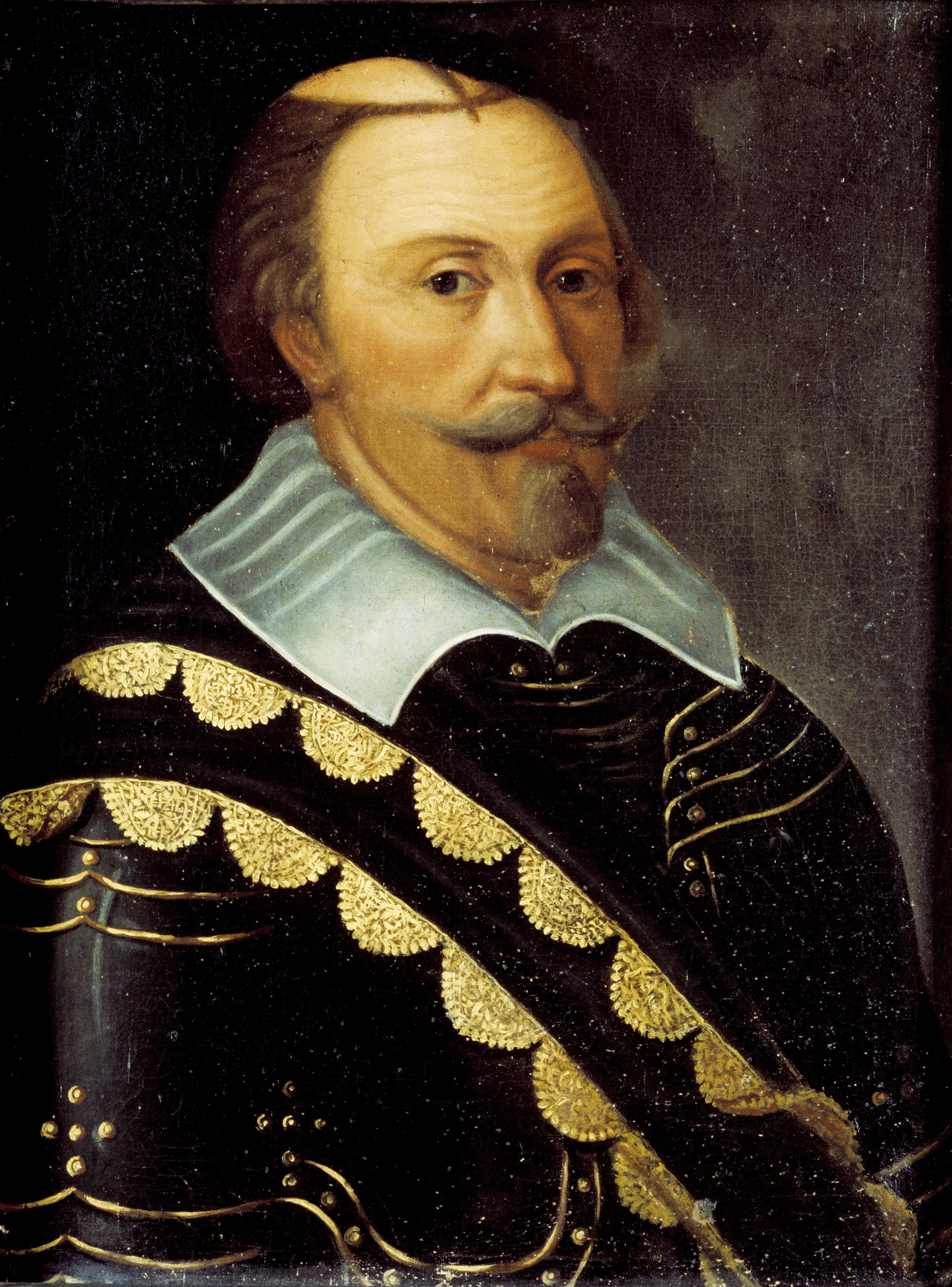
Charles IX, 1550–1611

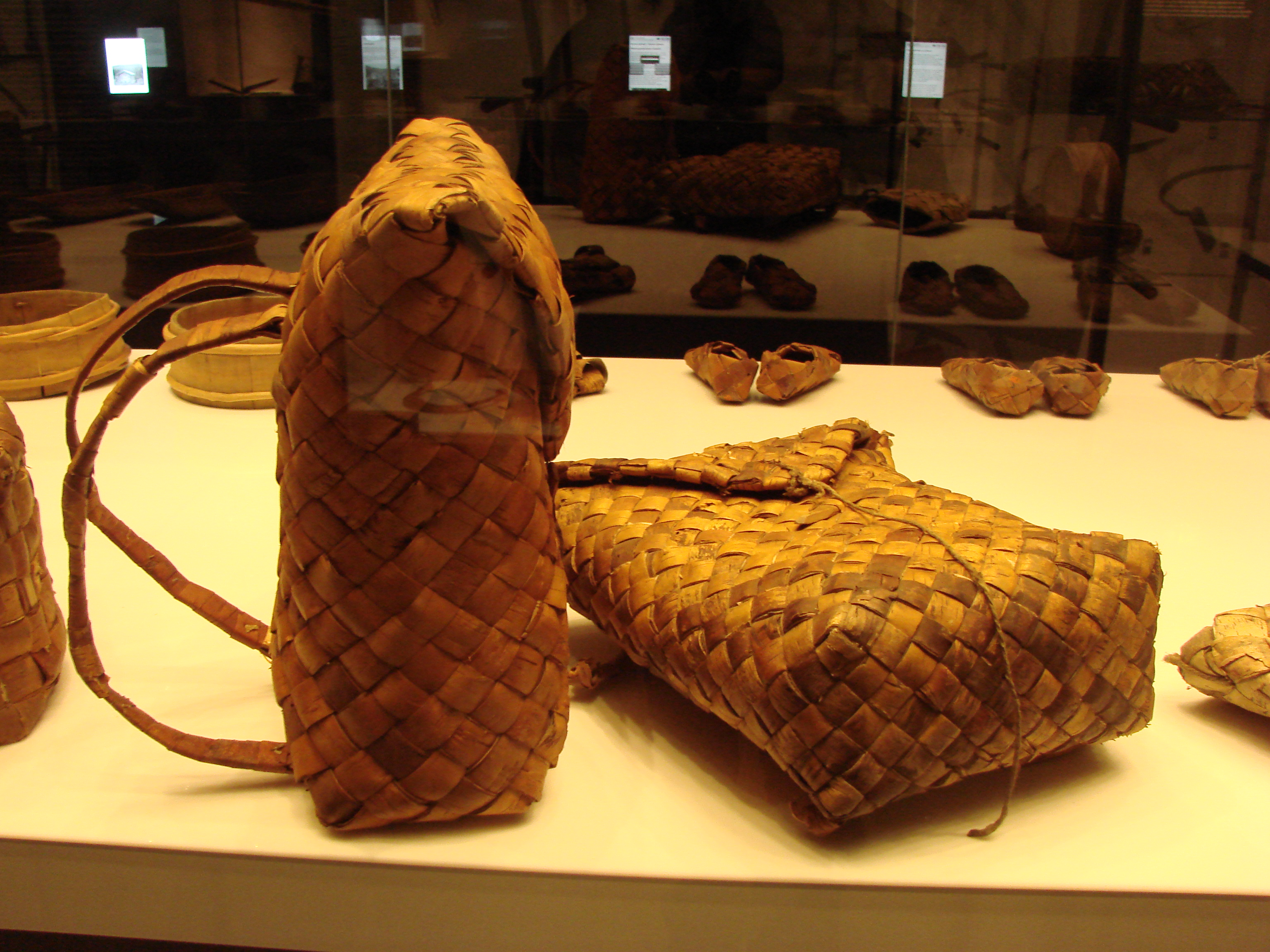
A Forest Finn backpack, or kontti.

In Sweden, the migration of the Forest Finns was not only well accepted at first, but also masterminded and encouraged by the kings, notably Charles IX (r. 1604–11) and Gustavus Adolphus (r. 1611–32). They did so in order to make the vast border areas of the North, East and West of the kingdom inhabited. Among attractions offered for the migrating Finnish farmers in Sweden were seven years total exemption of all taxation and the prospect of ownership of large fertile plots of land.

The situation would change as an emerging, but primitive, iron industry was growing in the beginning of the 17th century, smelting was powered by charcoal. The Forest Finns with their demanding slash-and-burn agriculture were suddenly considered an economic threat by increasing the cost of charcoal by burning off now valuable timber. The burning of the forests was officially forbidden in 1647 and the Finns were obliged to support the iron factories by providing charcoal at an artificially low price.

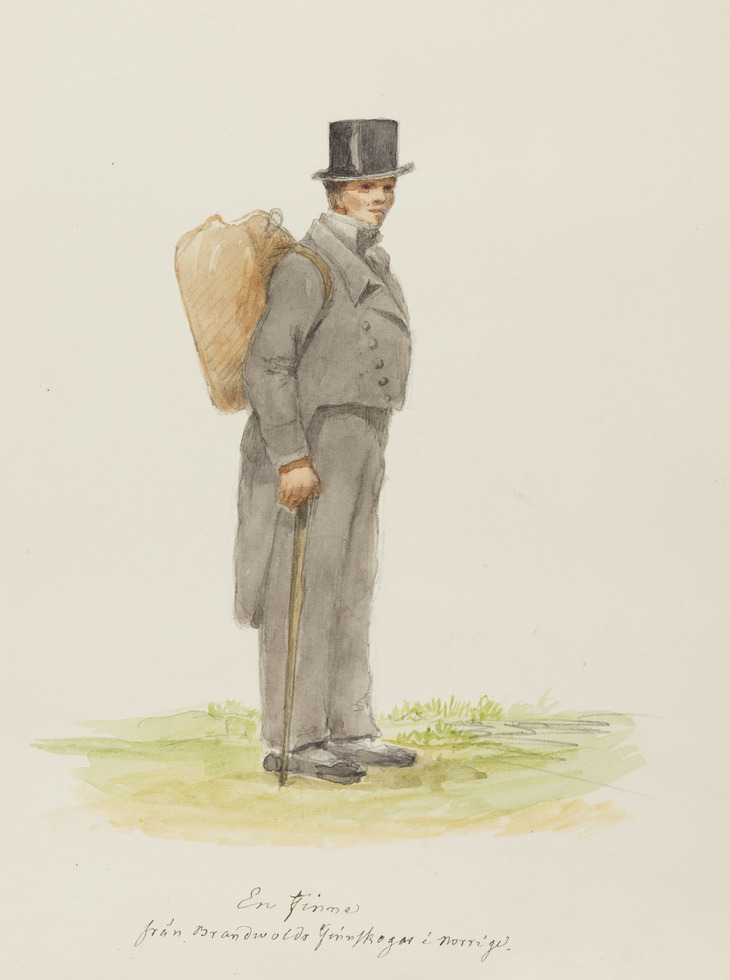
Forest Finn from Sweden or Norway in the beginning of the 19th century

By the end of the 18th century, a large part of the descendants of the Forest Finns had become culturally assimilated into the Swedish mainstream population. During the previous two centuries, various laws and regulations had been passed to speed up the "Swedification" process to the Forest Finns, including total banning of the use of Finnish language.

In Denmark–Norway (Norway was then part of a union), the situation was somewhat similar. The Dano-Norwegian authorities in Copenhagen were allegedly in favor of the de facto immigration and their slash-and-burn agriculture due to the relatively high yields of rye production, compared to traditional Norwegian staples. However, from the middle of the 17th century the locals communicated their dissatisfaction with the newcomers, and in 1648 King Frederick III issued a "decree on the Forest Finns" (Norwegian: Forordning om skogfinner), an ultimatum which provided they either return to Sweden or accept the same taxation as the native Norwegians.

Despite new legislation by 1673, immigration continued, and by 1686 the authorities responded by arranging the Forest Finn Census (Norwegian: Finnemanntallet) – at the time probably the most detailed census in Norway. It not only included men, but also women and children of the Forest Finn population. The 1686 census still exists and provides valuable information about the extent of the immigration to Norway at that time, and a total of 1,225 people (including 160 of mixed Finnish-Norwegian descent) were accounted for. Furthermore, most of them were in fact second or third generation descendants of immigrants from Savonia.

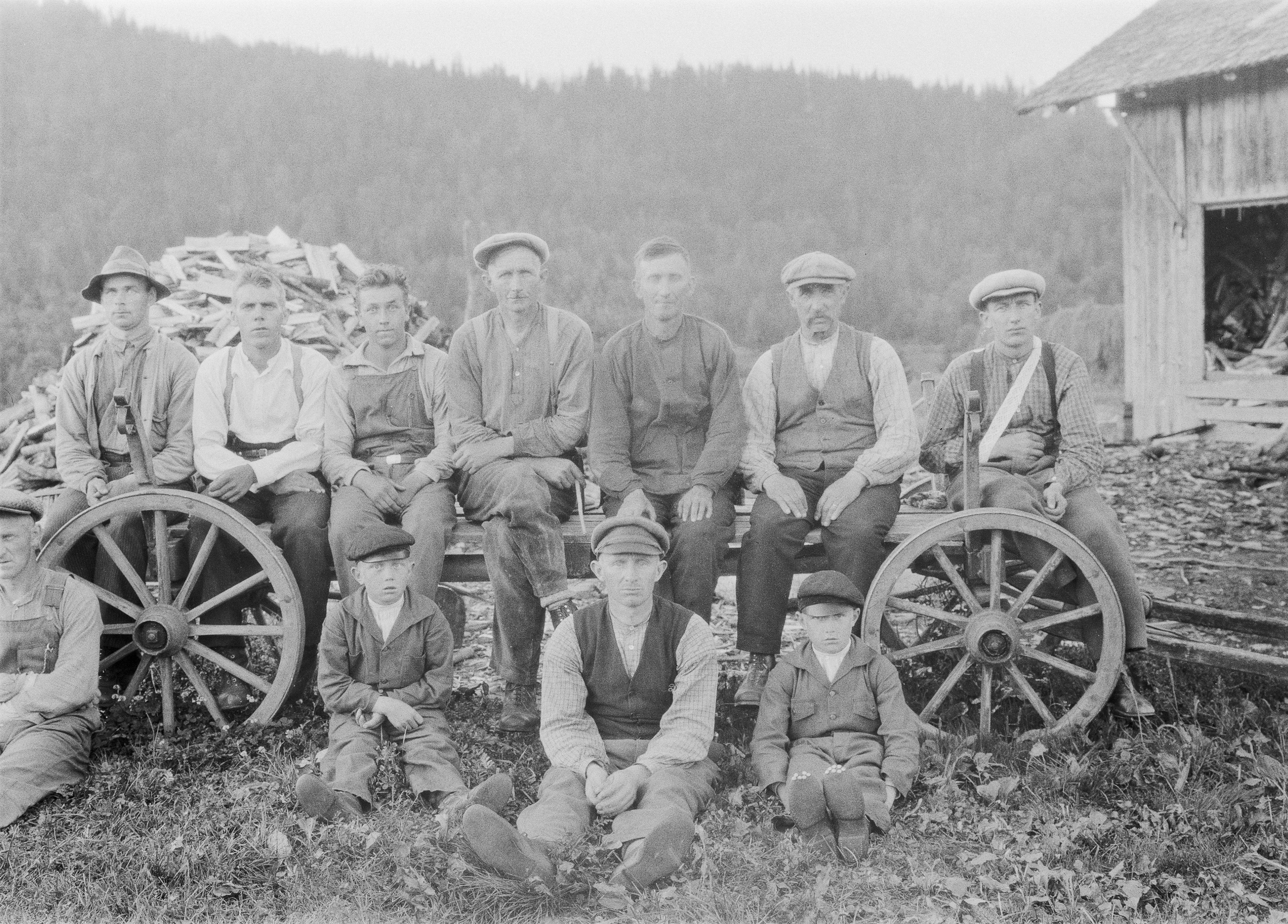
Forest Finns in Purala, Östmark during harvest season in 1931.

During the next centuries, the opportunities for their traditional slash-and-burn method declined. Societal advances, including a changing emphasis on pasture-based agricultural models, improvements in education and communications, altered the foundations on which the Forest Finn’s lifestyle depended. Over time, keeping livestock and other domesticated animals for food gradually became an important part of the Forest Finns’ livelihood. As the value of timber increased, forestry as a trade of its own became profitable to both the Forest Finns and others alike.

Dependence upon the slash-and-burn method slowly declined in the 19th century because of the new economic realities. The building of an education system and the development of communication sped this decline. Long-term pressure to adapt, and the influence of intermixing with the extant Scandinavian populations in concert with economic and societal change led to the eventual loss of their identity as Forest Finns.

== Carl Axel Gottlund ==
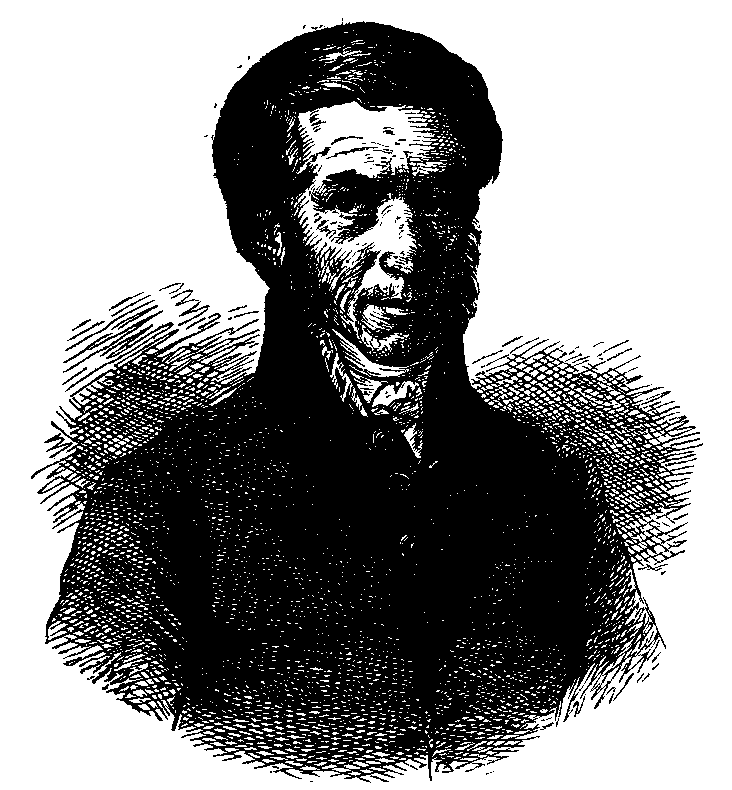
Carl Axel Gottlund, 1796–1875

Carl Axel Gottlund (1796–1875) was one of the central Finnish national awakeners, who is commonly attributed with saving the folklore of the Forest Finns, and he also tried to act as a national awakener among them.

Gottlund was born into the family of a Finnish clergyman, Mattias Gottlund, one of the most outstanding representatives of Enlightenment ideas in Finland and Carl Axel was raised in the spirit of the Enlightenment, and the basic structure of his thinking represented rationalistic Enlightenment ideals. The family had lived in Juva, Savonia, since 1805. The language of the family was Swedish because of his Swedish-speaking mother, but in the Finnish-speaking neighbourhood the young Carl Axel became finnicised.

Gottlund made two trips to the Forest Finns, the first in 1817 to Dalarna and the second, longer, one in 1820–21 to Värmland. He collected folklore and other ethnographic data as well as genealogical information, the latter partly because he wanted to improve the social circumstances of the Forest Finns and to prevent Sweden from taking ownership of their land. He estimated that in the beginning of the 19th century there were about 40,000 Finns in Central Scandinavia, of which about 14,000 were in Värmland.

His social and political activity for the benefit of the Forest Finns was idealistic. He wanted to create an autonomous area—named Fennia—from the Finn Forests on both sides of the Swedish-Norwegian border, with great economic and political independence. The tax border would have been removed and land ownership by Swedes and Norwegians would have been restricted. He would have closed the iron factories. He himself wanted to become the vicar of his planned Finnish parish. All these plans failed and Gottlund himself was exiled from Stockholm to Uppsala.

In spite of this total political failure, Gottlund had positive cultural influence on the Forest Finns. Among his accomplishments, Gottlund founded three congregations for the Forest Finns. Gottlund himself became a legendary, heroic character in the Forest Finns.

== Situation today ==
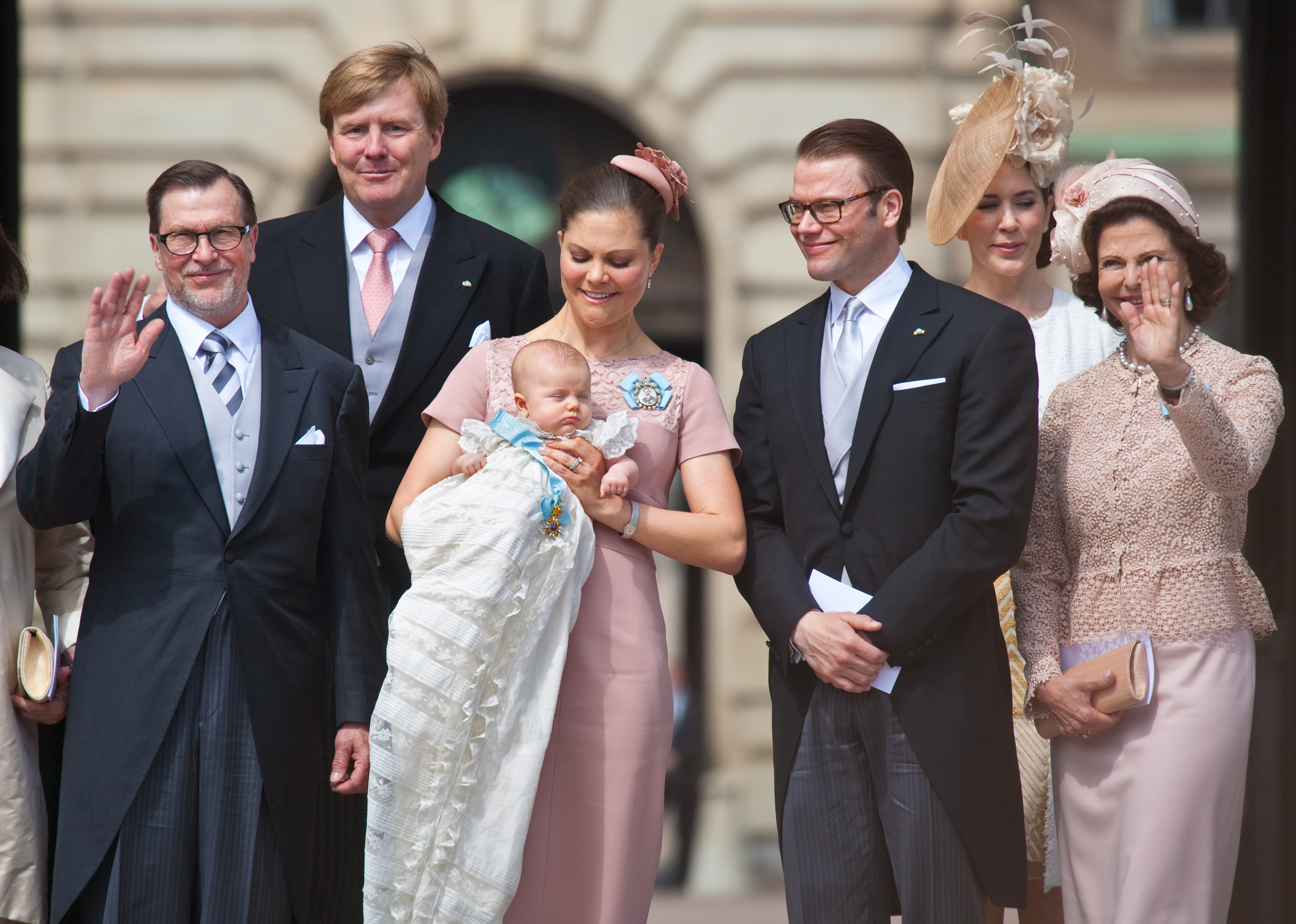
Prince Daniel, Duke of Västergötland (center right), the husband of Crown Princess Victoria of Sweden, is of Forest Finn background. His father, Olle Gunnar Westling (far left), is associated with Finnskogarna.com promoting tourism based on the Forest Finns culture in Sweden.

Today, the Forest Finns are fully assimilated into the Norwegian and Swedish societies and their language is extinct. The last Forest Finns of Sweden known to have spoken Finnish fluently were Johannes Johansson-Oinoinen (a.k.a. Niittahon Jussi, died 1965) and Karl Persson (died 1969).

However, the culture of the Forest Finns lives to a various degree in Norway and Sweden, and a number of place names commemorate the Finnish origins of various areas they settled, including in the Delaware Valley of the United States where Morton, Delaware County in Pennsylvania, is named for Sketchley Morton, son of John Morton. John Morton was a Founding Father of the United States due to his efforts as a delegate to the Continental Congress during the American Revolution, signatory to the Declaration of Independence, and being chairman of the committee that wrote the Articles of Confederation and descended from Martti Marttinen (anglicized to Morton), an immigrant from Rautalampi, Finland. In Grue Municipality, Norway, over a quarter of the place names are still Finnish.

The Forest Finns, who are defined as a national minority in Norway today, are a distinct group from the other Finnish groups in Scandinavia: the Tornedalians along the Swedish-Finnish border, the Kvens in the Northern Norwegian counties of Troms and Finnmark, and the Finns who have moved to Sweden following World War II.

Descendants of the Forest Finns still live in Norway and Sweden.

== Forest Finn flag ==
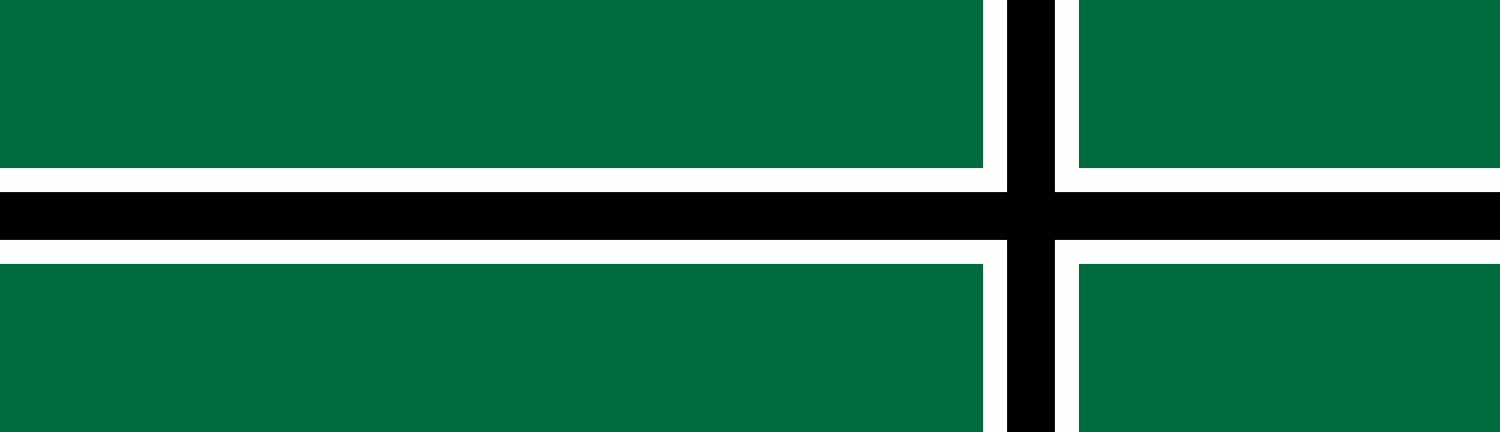
The unofficial flag of the Forest Finns which was introduced in 1978.

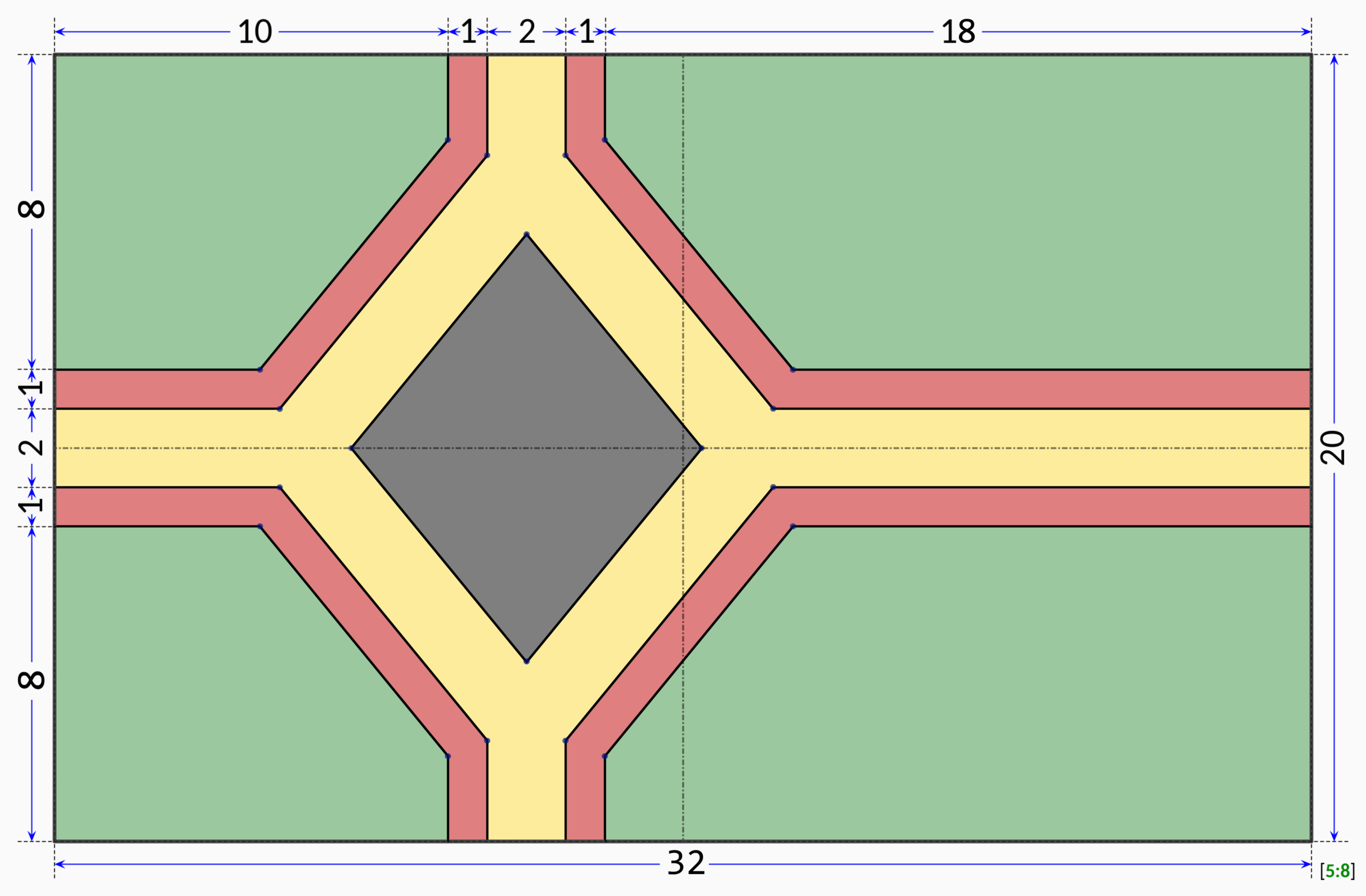
Construction sheet of the flag.

The cultural flag of the Forest Finns was adopted on 29 December 2022 and designed by the Norwegian couple Frédéric M. Lindboe and Bettina Gullhagen. The flag was designed as part of a flag design competition to adopt an official cultural flag for the Forest Finns. The competition was held during the summer of 2021 and received hundreds of proposals. When the original draft of the current flag was chosen, it lacked the red fimbriation between the yellow and green, which was later added by the flag committee before adoption.

The flag is a yellow Nordic cross design on a green canvas with red fimbriation. The centre of the cross is deformed with a black rhombus shape derived from a traditional Forest Finn symbol for fertility, which is found on old Forest Finn settlements. The proportions and placement of the cross is the same as the Flag of Sweden. The relative thickness of the red and yellow on the cross is 1:2 and matches the Flag of Norway. Representing the Forest Finns in both Norway and Sweden.

The green represents the importance of the forest for the Forest Finns’ slash-and-burn culture, the red represents fire and the holy rowan tree, the yellow represents the rye from slash-and-burn farming and the black represents the soot of slash-and-burn. The color scheme is also meant to match the flags of the Finnish regions of Savonia and Tavastia, in which the Forest Finns originated.

The flag was officially for the first time hoisted at a governmental flag pole on 4 May 2023, at the Oslo City Hall. Marking the 200 year anniversary of the "Tolvmannamarsjen" of 1823.

== Sources ==
- Carl Axel Gottlund – biography.
- Pulkkinen, Risto: Carl Axel Gottlund. (Finnish National Biography)
- C. A. Gottlund: Ruotsin suomalaismetsiä samoilemassa – Suomalaisen Kirjallisuuden Seura, 1928.
- Metsäsuomalaiset Ruotsissa ("Forest Finns in Sweden"). Wallin Väinö. Otava, Helsinki, 1898.
- Sverigesradio.se – Olle Westling (5.53–6.00min) «Hver femte svensk seijs ju härstamma från den skogfinska innflytningen» – one of each five Swedes are said to descend from the Forestfinn immigration.
- Finnkulturcentrum.com – the Center of Finnish Culture.
