= Five Christmas Songs =

Collection of art songs by Jean Sibelius (1899–1900)

- Song collection by Jean Sibelius
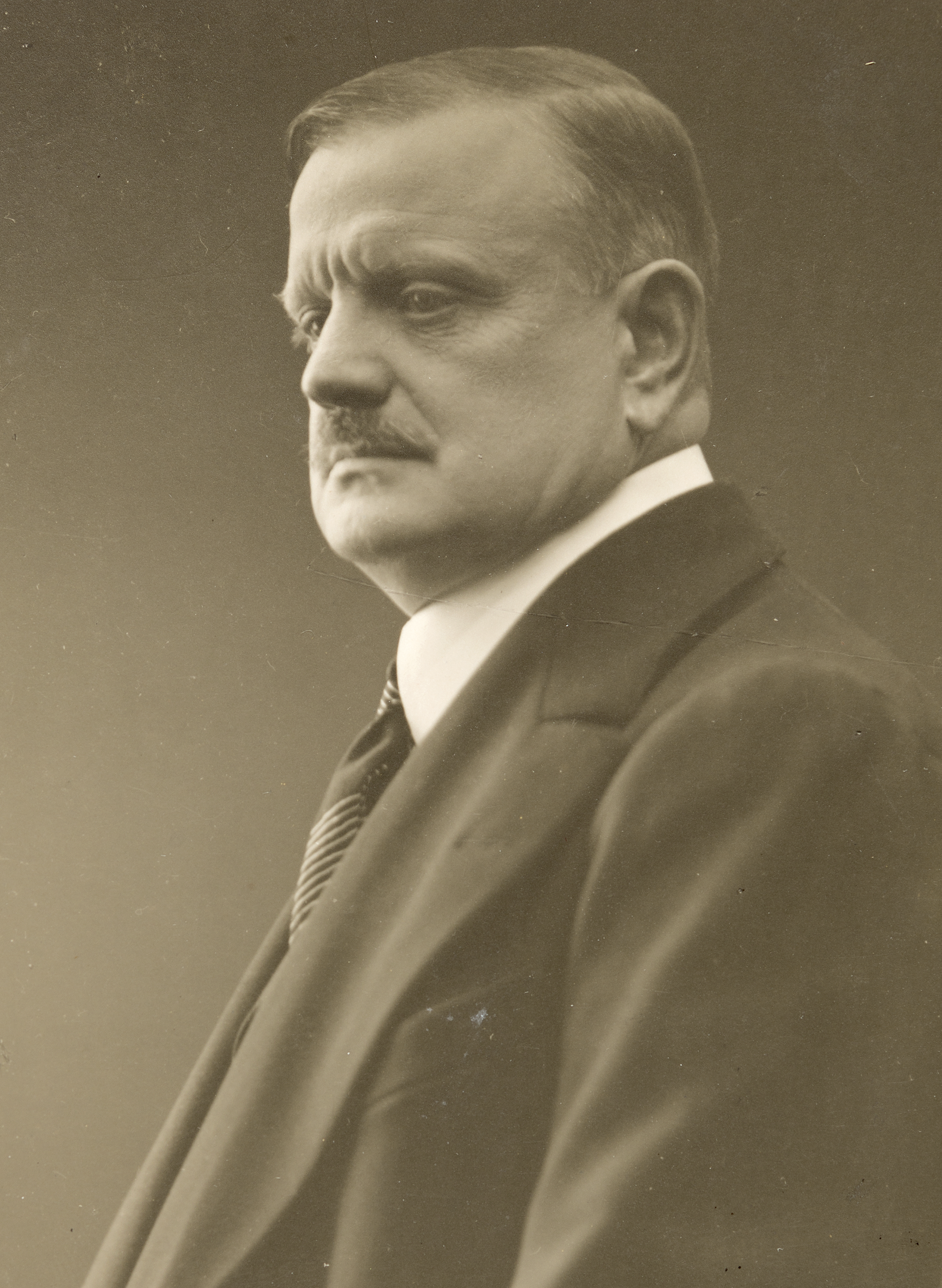
- The composer (c. 1900)
- Opus: 1
- Language: Swedish
- Composed: 1897–1913

The Five Christmas Songs, Op. 1, (Note: Because Sibelius's Op. 1 songs are sung in Swedish, this article gives preference to each song's native title, rather than the English translation.) is a collection of Swedish-language art songs for vocal soloist and piano written from 1897 to 1913 by the Finnish composer Jean Sibelius.

== Constituent songs ==
Ordered by catalogue, the Op. 1 songs are as follows:

- "Nu står jul vid snöig port" ("Now Christmas Stands at the Snowy Gate"), Op. 1/1 (1913); text by the Finnish poet Zacharias Topelius
- "Nu så kommer julen" ("Now Is Christmas Coming"), Op. 1/2 (1913); text by Topelius
- "Det mörknar ute" ("Outside It is Growing Dark"), Op. 1/3 (1897); text by Topelius
- "Giv mig ej glans, ej guld, ej prakt" ("Give Me No Splendor, Gold or Pomp"), Op. 1/4 (1909); text by Topelius
- "On hanget korkeat, nietokset" ("High are the Snowdrifts"), Op. 1/5 (1901); text by the Finnish poet Wilkku Joukahainen

=== Arrangements of Nos. 4–5 ===
Sibelius made several arrangements of "Giv mig ej glans, ej guld, ej prakt": for male choir a cappella in 1935; for voice and female choir a cappella in 1942; for two unaccompanied female voices in 1942; and for children's choir and organ in 1954. Moreover, he also made several arrangements of "On hanget korkeat, nietokset": for two voices and piano in 1903–1905; and for two unaccompanied female voices in 1942.

== Notes, references, and sources ==
=== Sources ===
- Barnett, Andrew (2007). Sibelius. New Haven, Connecticut: Yale University Press. ISBN 978-0-300-16397-1.
- Dahlström, Fabian [in Swedish] (2003). Jean Sibelius: Thematisch-bibliographisches Verzeichnis seiner Werke [Jean Sibelius: A Thematic Bibliographic Index of His Works] (in German). Wiesbaden: Breitkopf & Härtel. ISBN 3-7651-0333-0.
- Layton, Robert (1993) [1965]. Sibelius. (The Master Musicians Series) (4th ed.). New York: Schirmer Books. ISBN 0028713222.
