= Parkumäki =

Village in Rantasalmi, Finland

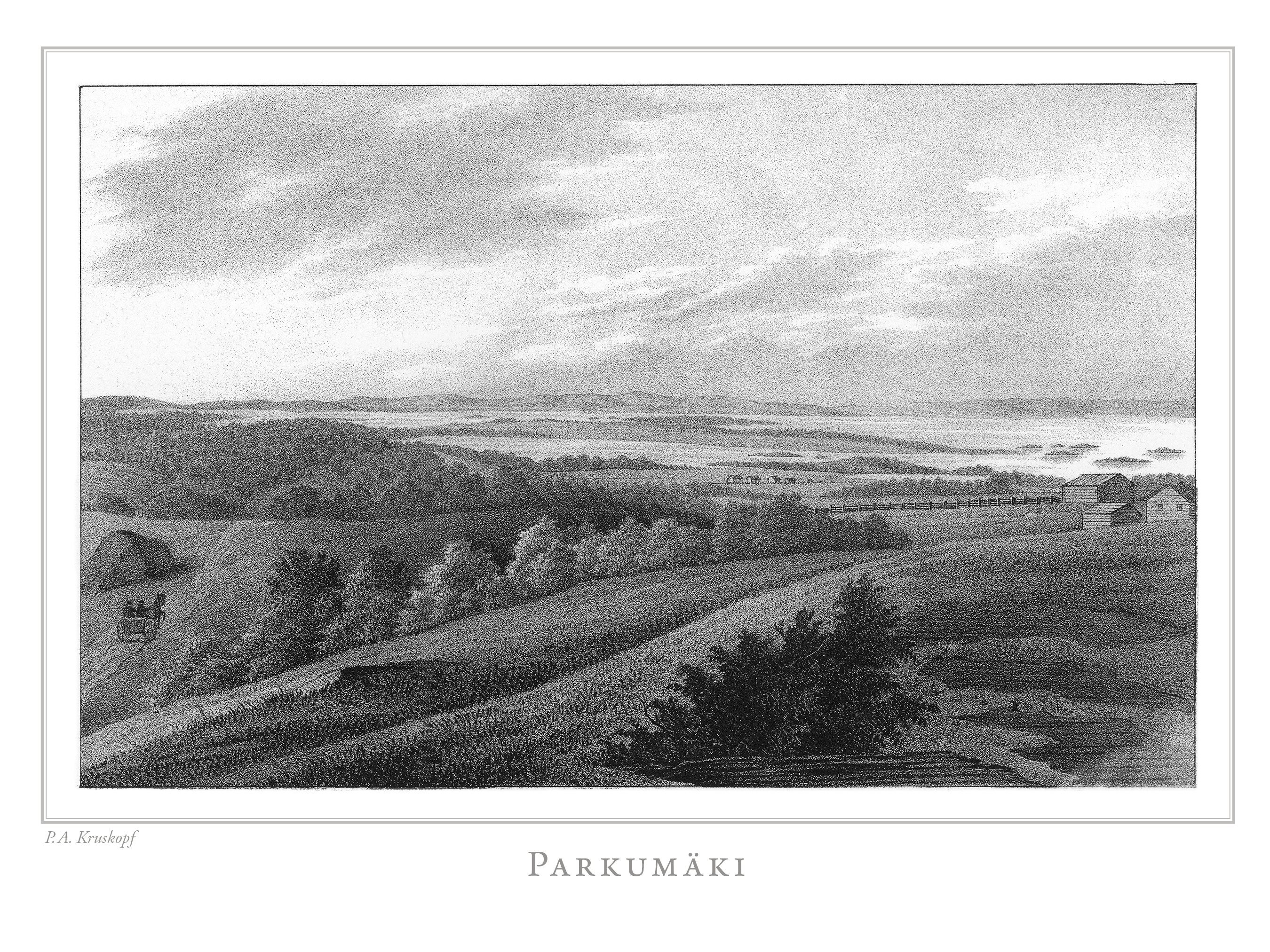
Illustration of Parkumäki in Finland framstäldt i teckningar edited by Zacharias Topelius and published 1845-1852.

Parkumäki is a Finnish village that was the site of the Battle of Parkumäki and its memorial. It is located in the Rantasalmi municipality in Southern Savonia.
