= Turku Castle =

Castle In Finland

- Turun linna Åbo slott
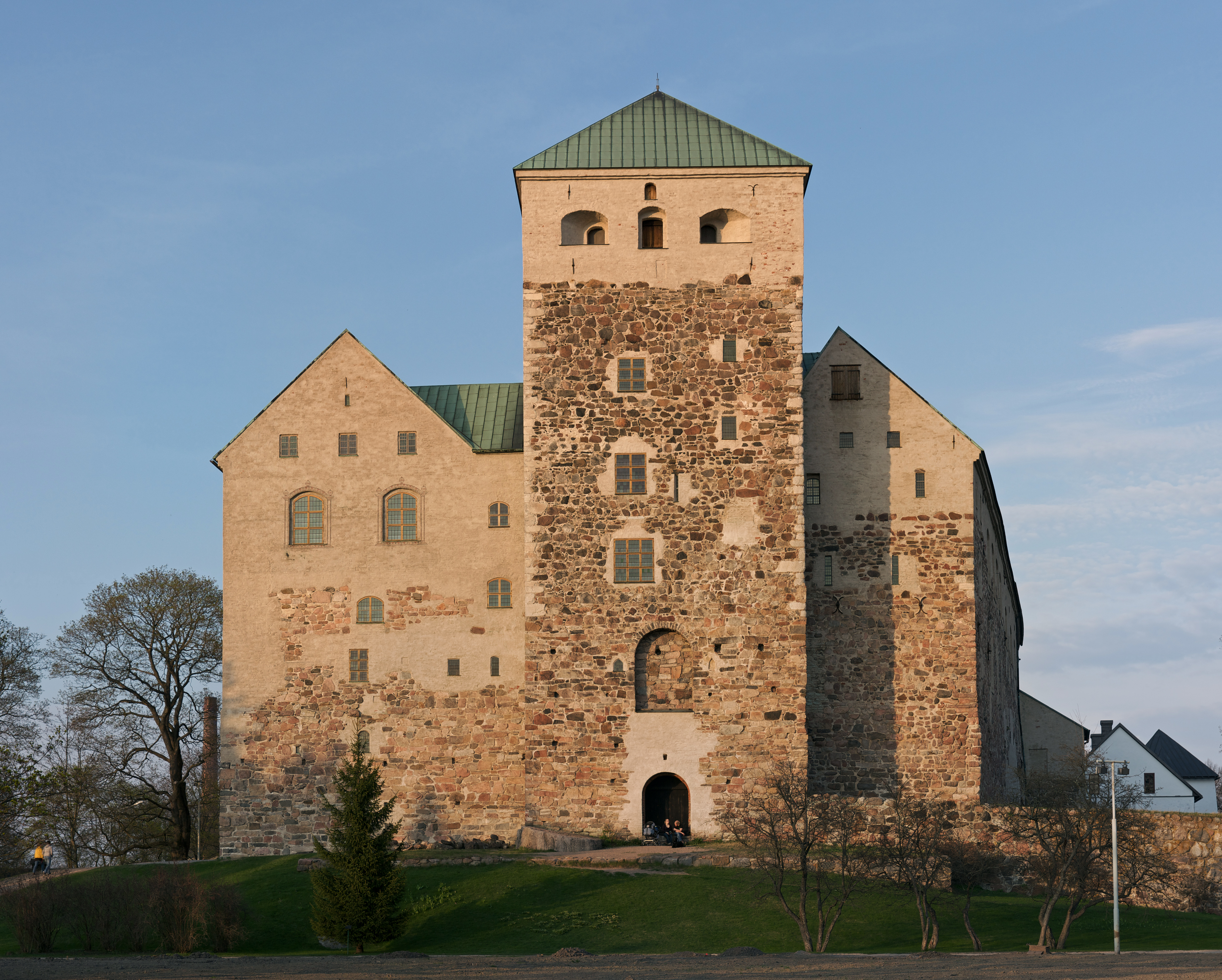
- Seen from the Port of Turku. The western end is iconic and is a symbol of the city.
- Interactive map of the Turku Castle area

General information
- Type: Medieval castle
- Location: Turku, Finland, Linnankatu 80; FI-20100 Turku; Finland
- Coordinates: 60°26′07″N 022°13′43″E

Turku Castle (Finnish: Turun linna, Swedish: Åbo slott) is a medieval structure in the city of Turku, Finland. Together with Turku Cathedral, the castle is one of the oldest buildings still in use in Finland. It is also the largest surviving medieval building in Finland. It was founded in the late 13th century and stands on the banks of the Aura River. The castle served as a bastion and administrative center in the historical region of Finland until the early 19th century. It played a role in power struggles within Sweden and the Kalmar Union and stood sieges, with additional battles fought outside its walls. The castle was at its peak in the mid-16th century, during the reign of Duke John of Finland and Catherine Jagellon. It lost its status as an administrative center in the 17th century, after Per Brahe's period as governor-general of Finland came to an end. Turku Castle is Finland's most visited museum. Visitations reach well over 100,000 people annually. Some of the rooms in the castle are used for municipal functions.

The castle was the center of the historical province of Finland Proper, and the administrative center of all of Finland.

== History ==
The construction of the fort began at around the year 1280. Swedes stationed in the region constructed it as a military fortress and outpost. The fort's defenses were bolstered and living quarters constructed during the following two centuries. The castle served as a defensive structure and administrative center in Österland, which was the name of the region known today as Finland, until the end of the 15th century. The main part of the castle was extended considerably during the 16th century, after Gustav Vasa had ascended to the Swedish throne. His son, John III of Sweden, was the head of the administration and duke of Finland at that time. The castle was generally improved upon during this time, with an addition of a tower at the southeast corner of the castle. These were the last additions to the main structure of the castle, and all work on the castle since then has focused on repairs and reconstruction.

Between 1395 to 1398, Turku Castle may have been used as a base of operations by the Victual Brothers, a band of privateers turned pirates, invited there by the chief of the castle, Knut Bosson Grip due to some larger international political intrigue and allegiances concerning trade in the Baltic Sea. In Paulus Juusten's episcopal chronicle, it is said that at the turn of the 15th century, pirates were causing havoc in and around the Turku archipelago. They looted the Turku Cathedral, a historical building in the center of Turku, also on the Aura river. It is on the opposite side of the town away from the sea. The cathedral is open for guided tours and unguided visitations.

The castle was at its peak in the mid-16th century, during the reign of Duke John of Finland and Catherine Jagellon. They constructed the Renaissance Floor and the King's and Queen's hall, along with some other new features.

In 1573 to 1577, the deposed Swedish Queen Karin Månsdotter was kept prisoner there.

In 1614, a great fire destroyed the wooden structures of the old parts of the castle almost completely. King Gustav II Adolf was at the castle for a visit. After the fire, the main castle structure was largely abandoned and used as storage.

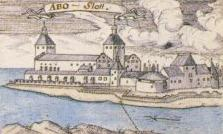
Castle seen in 1724

In the 18th century, the Renaissance bailey functioned as an administrative center, with the old main structure abandoned and in disrepair. The castle housed the provincial government after a period of turmoil called the Greater Wrath. The castle was used as a prison from the 18th to the end of the 19th century.

During the Finnish War between Sweden and Russia (1808-1809), the castle was used by the Russian Navy. It was later handed back to the Finnish regional authorities, as the Grand Duchy of Finland was granted larger autonomy by the Tzar of Russia.

In 1881, the Turku Historical Museum gained control of the castle. Finland gained full independence at the end of 1917, and thus the republic of Finland gained ownership of the castle.

The renovation of the castle began before the start of the Second World War. As Finland was drawn into conflict in the Winter War (1939), and then the Continuation War (1941 to 1944), the renovation project was halted. The renovation was continued after the wars ended. The castle was damaged during the Continuation War by Soviet incendiary bombardment.

The castle was fully restored in 1987. Responsibility over the now restored castle was handed over to the City of Turku on October 12, 1993. The city is currently entrusted with all Turku Castle related events and administration, on behalf of the government of Finland.

Since then, the castle has been a historical museum and it functions as part of the Turku Provincial Museum.

The old part of the castle holds the banquet rooms and a church for the local congregation. The castle courtyard hosts a restaurant and a souvenir shop. Turku castle is one of Finland's most visited historical attractions and museums. Entrance to the inner castle is not free. Tickets are sold at a lowered price to pensioners, children, and the unemployed. The tickets cost under 20€, as of summer 2024.

There is a public park surrounding the castle.

== Structure ==
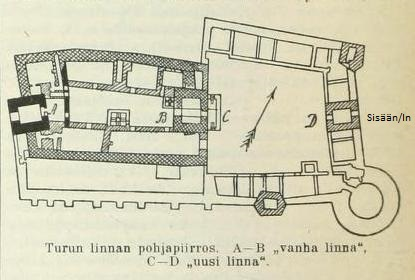
Turku Castle plan

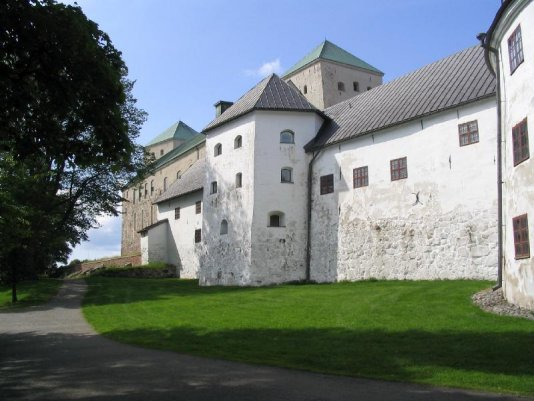
Turku castle bailey

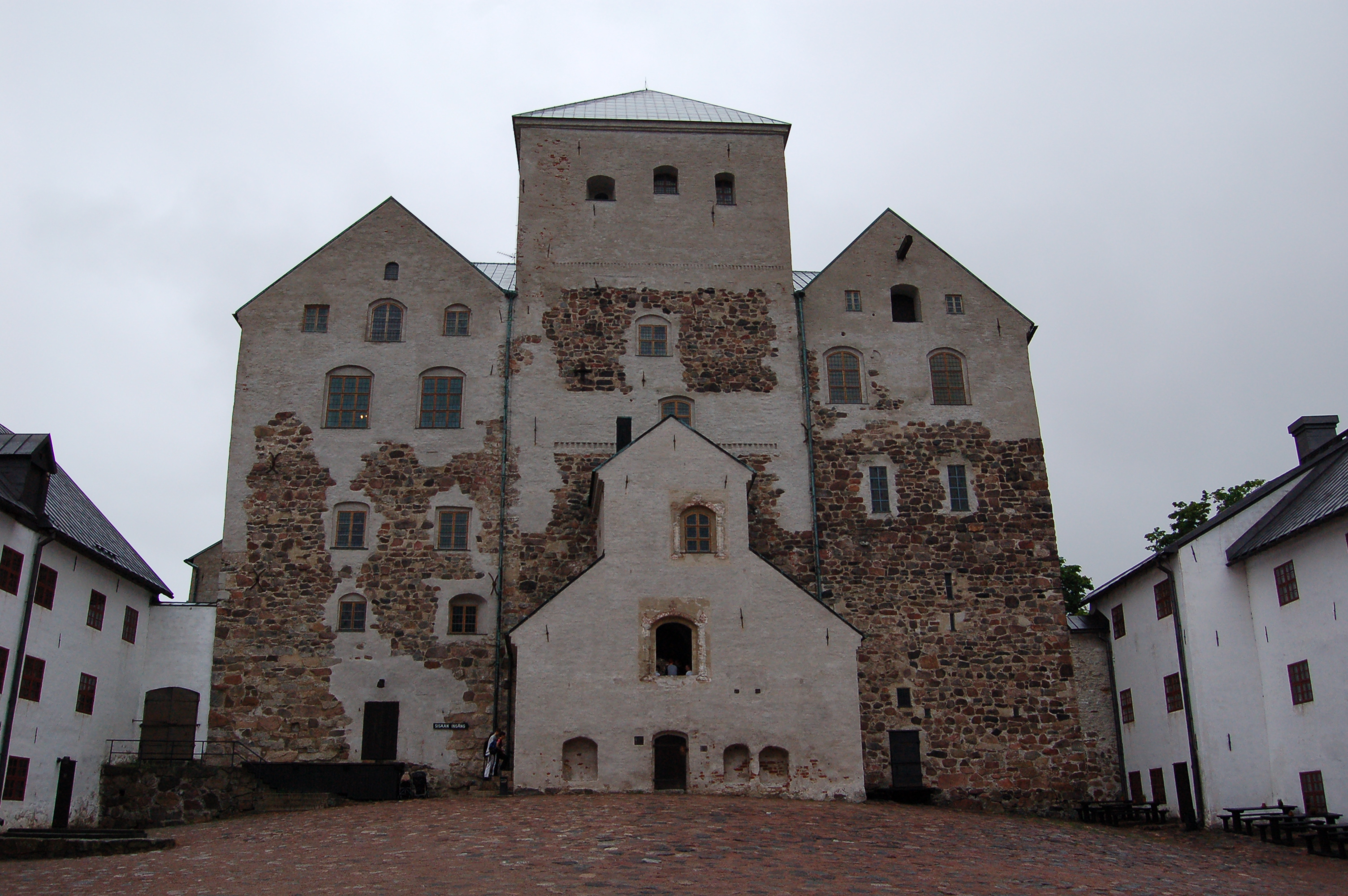
The castle's courtyard

The layout of the castle consists of the Medieval keep (päälinna) and the Renaissance bailey (esilinna). The keep consists of a square fort, with two square gateway towers. The walls are 5 metres (16 ft) at the base.

In the Middle Ages the castle was surrounded by a moat, conjoining it with the River Aura. The castle was basically an island. The keep was finalized in the early 15th century. Construction of the bailey began in the late 15th century. It was finished in the 16th century. The bailey is not as fortified as the keep, but it boasts several turrets. The Renaissance construction work included heavy modifications of nearly all the rooms in the old part of the castle. Since the Renaissance, no additions have been made to the main structure, or functionality and appearance of the castle.

== Castellans ==
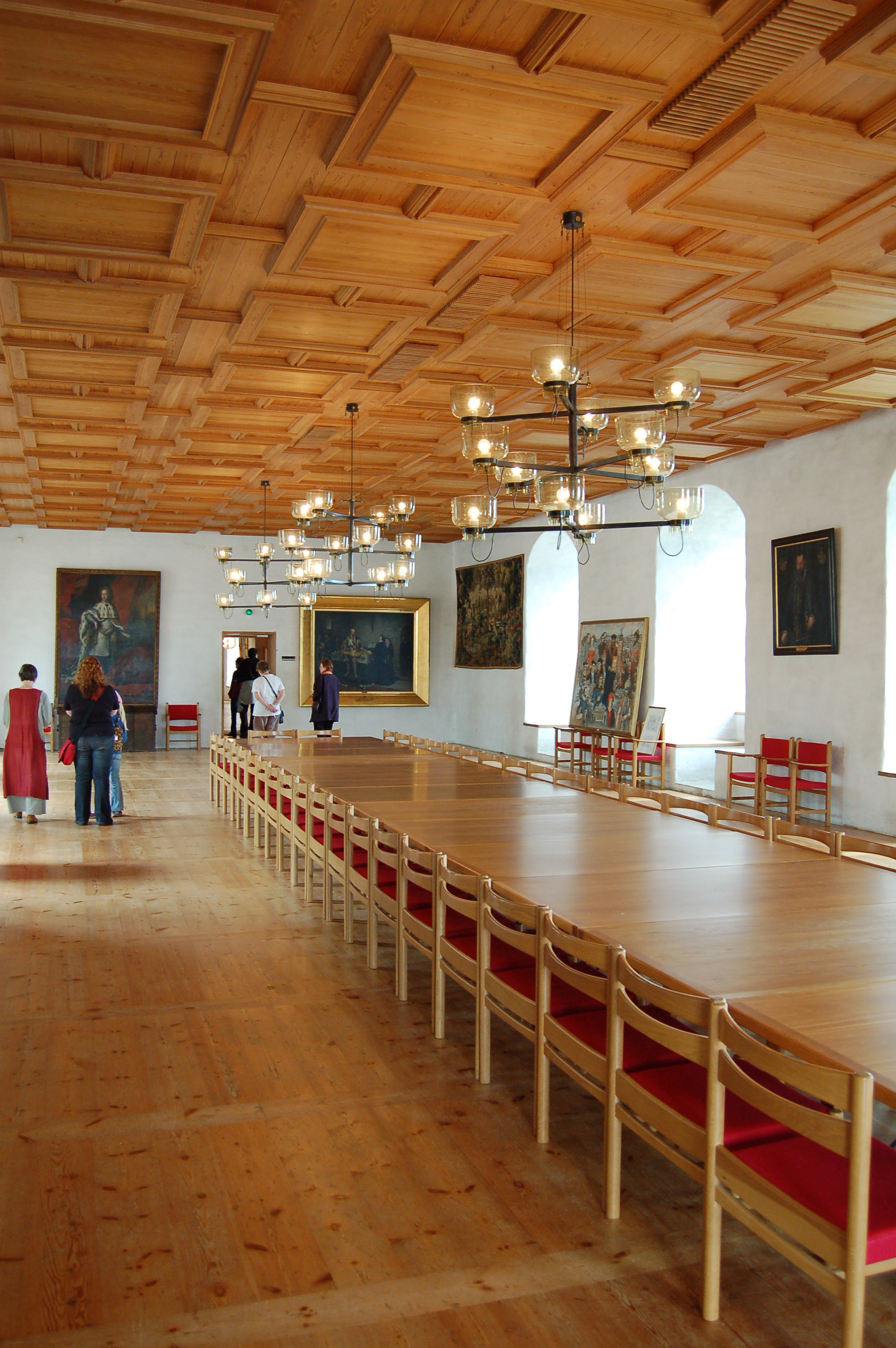
King's Hall inside the castle

Various castellans, bailiffs, military commanders, governors who held Turku Castle in the Middle Ages:

- 1280s: Carolus Gustavi
- 1300s (early): Nils Andersson and Harald Torsteinsson
- 1315–22: Lyder van Kyren, from Holstein
- 1324–26: Matts Kettilmundsson (concentrated commerce in Turku, brought a courtly and knightly culture)
- 1326: Karl Näskonungsson
- 1340: Dan Nilsson
- 1348 (circa): Gerhard Skytte
- 1358: Nils Turesson Bielke
- 1359: King Magnus IV, represented by Bishop Hemming
- 1360 (circa): Narve Ingevaldsen from Norway
- 1375: Bo Jonsson Grip, died 1386
- 1387: Jeppe Abrahamsson Djäkn
- 1395: Knut Bosson (Grip)
- 1399: the Union monarchs (Margaret I of Denmark & Eric of Pomerania)
- 1411: Klaus Lydekesson Djäkn
- 1435: Hans Kröpelin
- 1441: Karl Knutsson (the future Charles VIII of Sweden)
- 1457–63: Kristofer Bengtsson Oxenstierna
- 1465: Erik Axelsson Tott
- 1469: Sten Sture the Elder
- 1499: Magnus Frille (appointed by King Hans)
- 1501: Sten Sture the Elder
- 1503: Svante Nilsson
- 1512: Kristofer Klasson Horn

== In popular culture ==
The Turku Castle is the setting for the fairy tale The Tomten in Åbo Castle, written by Zachris Topelius in 1849. Turku Castle was badly damaged during the time the story was written. Following the release of the fairy tale, there were calls for the restoration of the castle.

The walls of the castle and the castle itself are featured in many Finnish films like the adventure film Sadan miekan mies from 1951, directed by Ilmari Unho, and a drama film The Girl King from 2015, directed by Mika Kaurismäki.

== Gallery ==
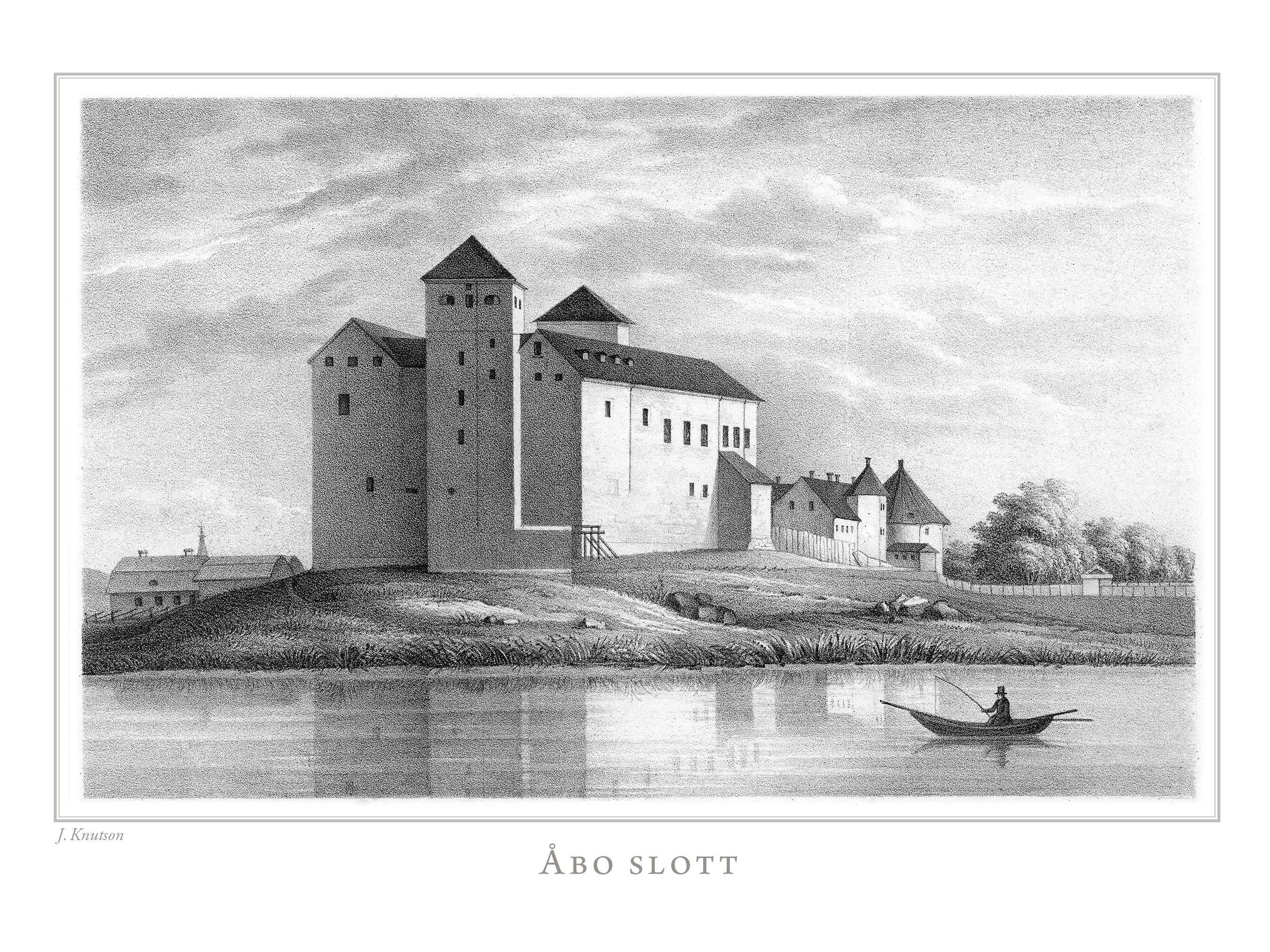
The castle drawn by Johan Knutson and published in Finland framställdt i teckningar in 1845

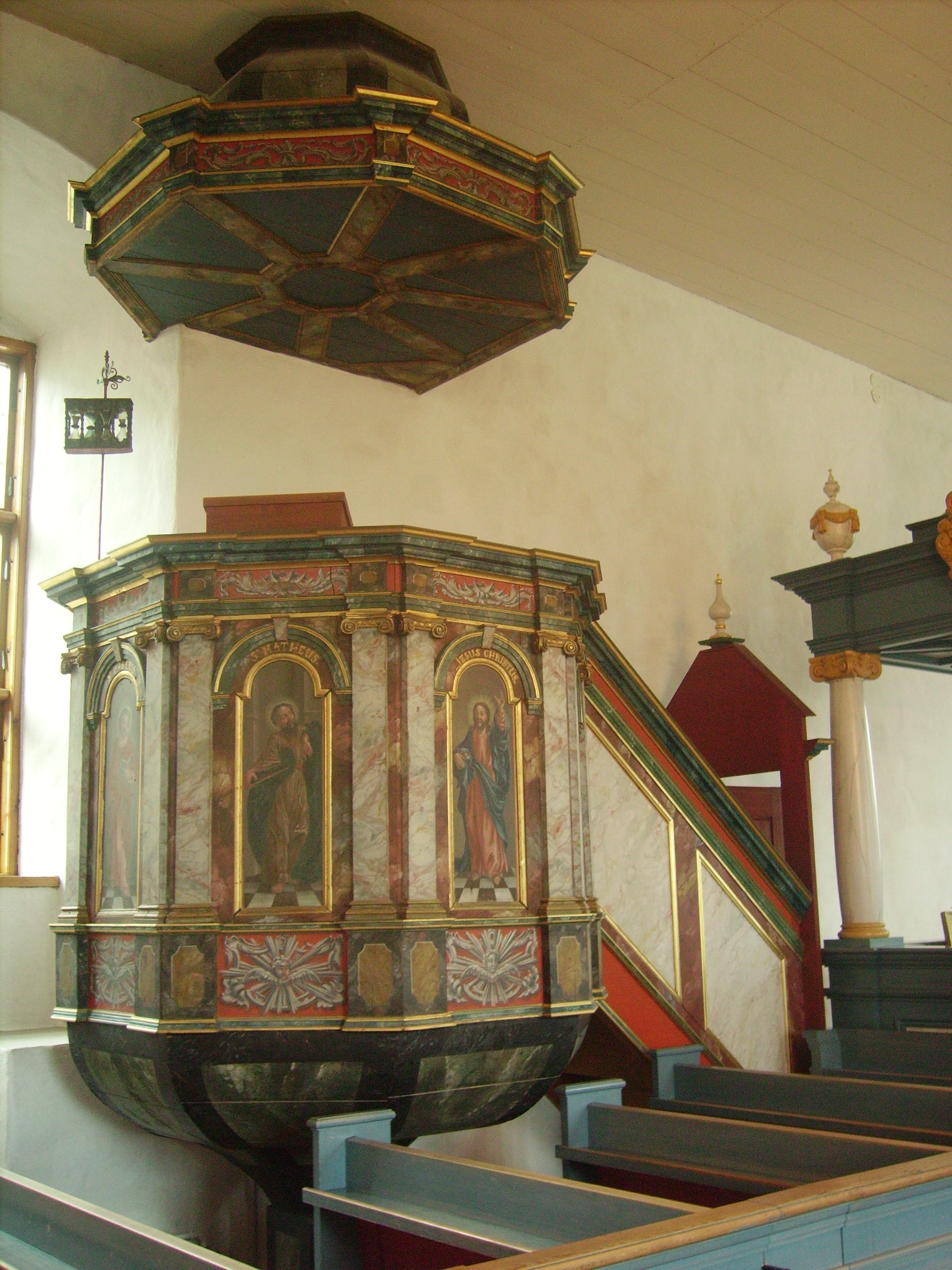

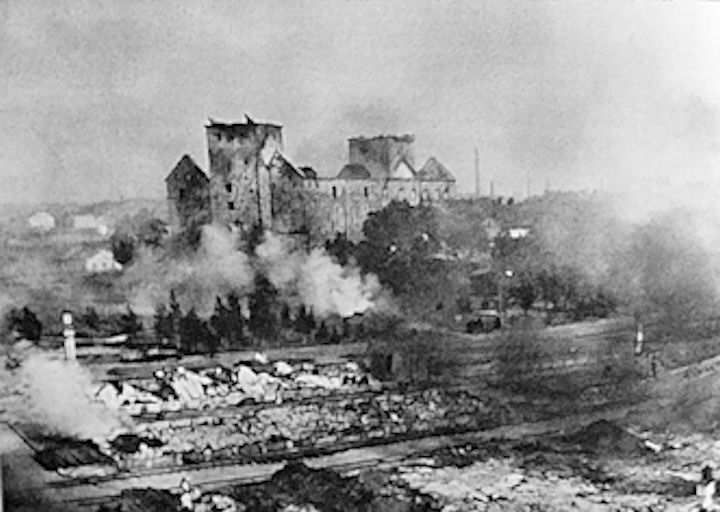

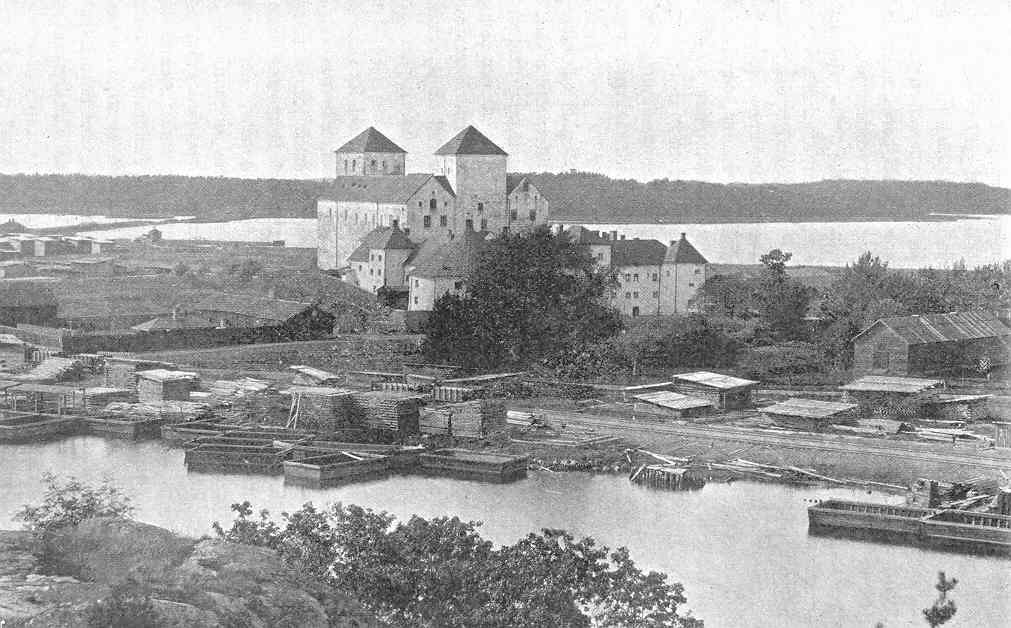

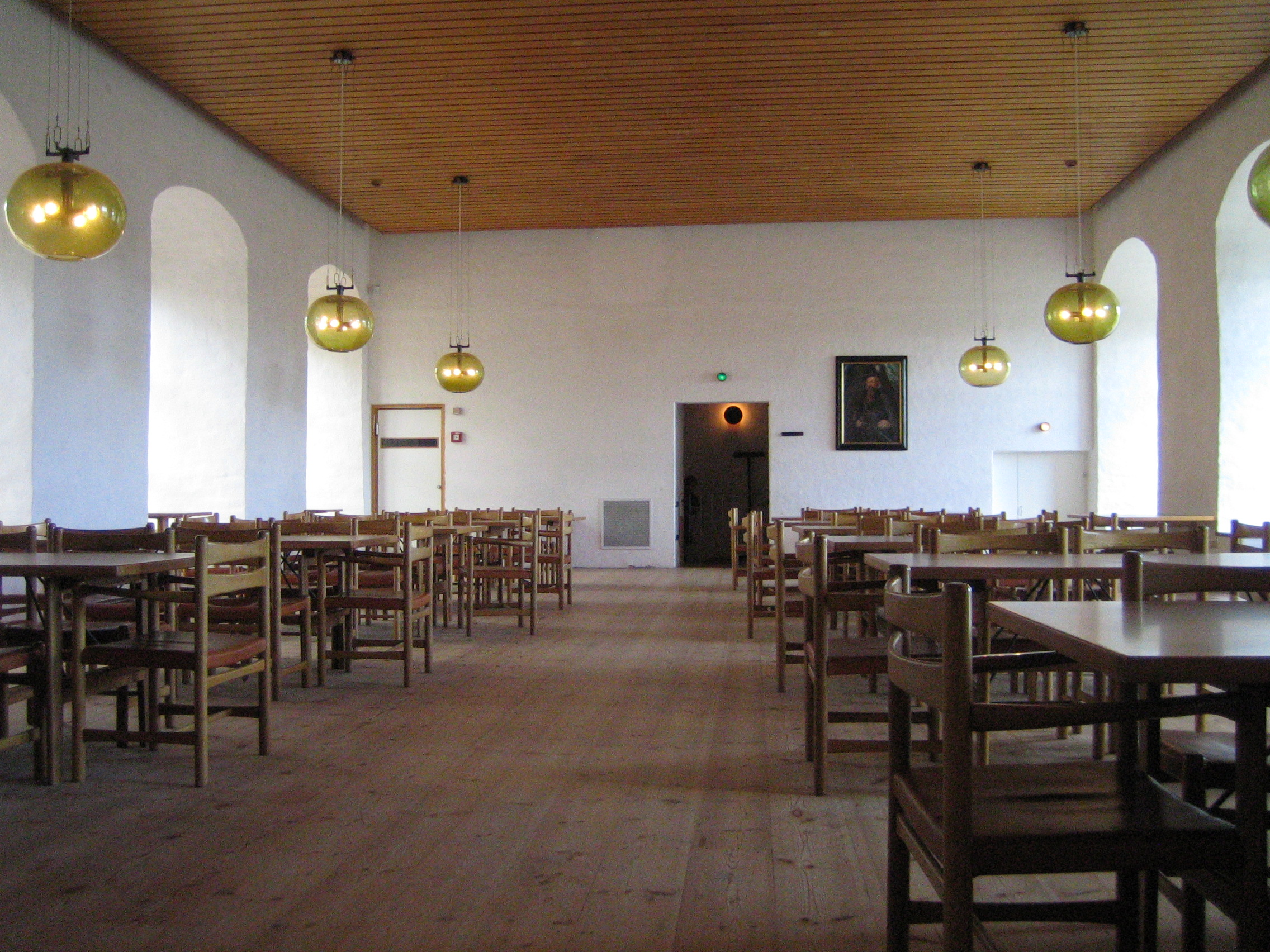

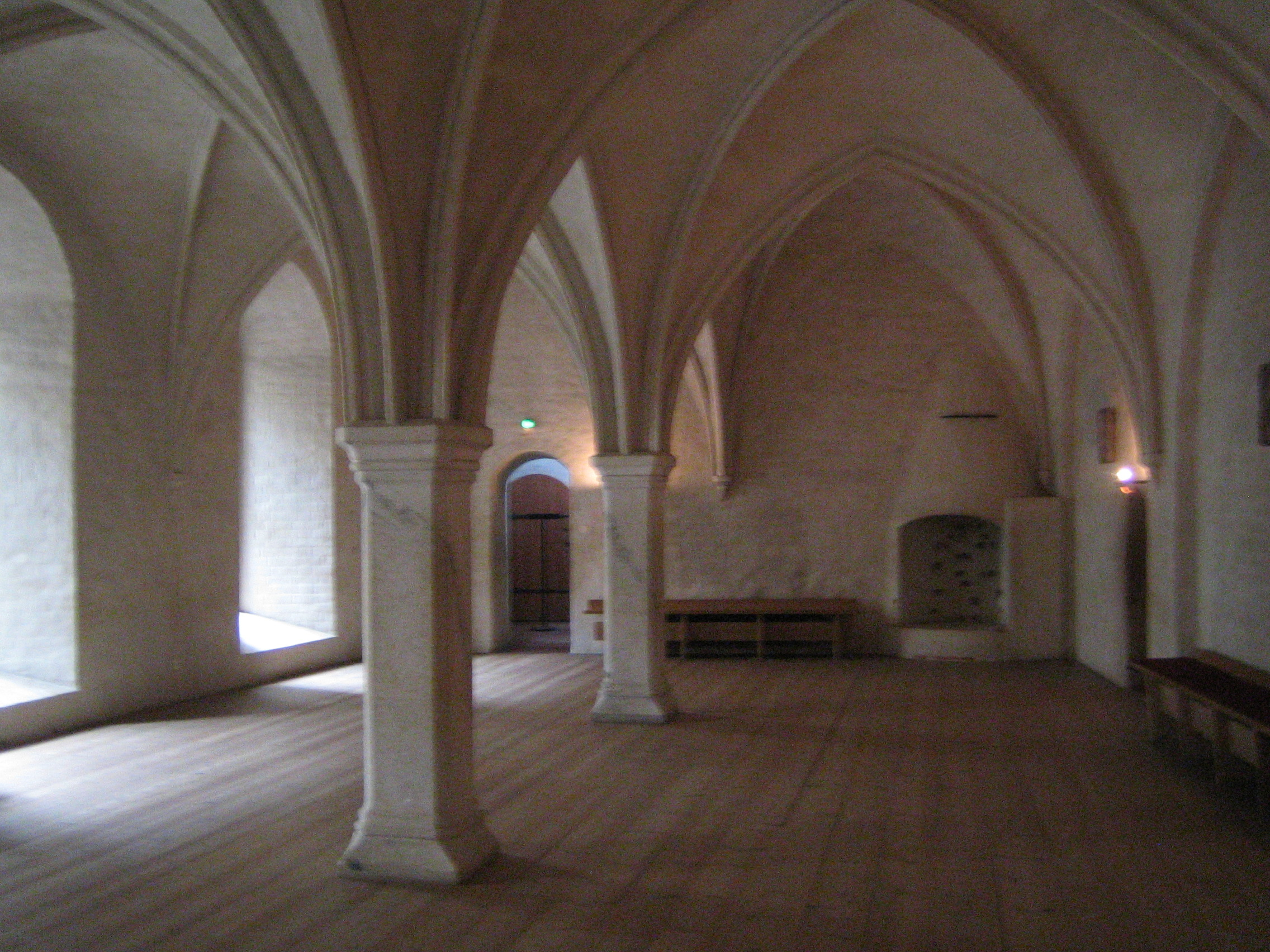

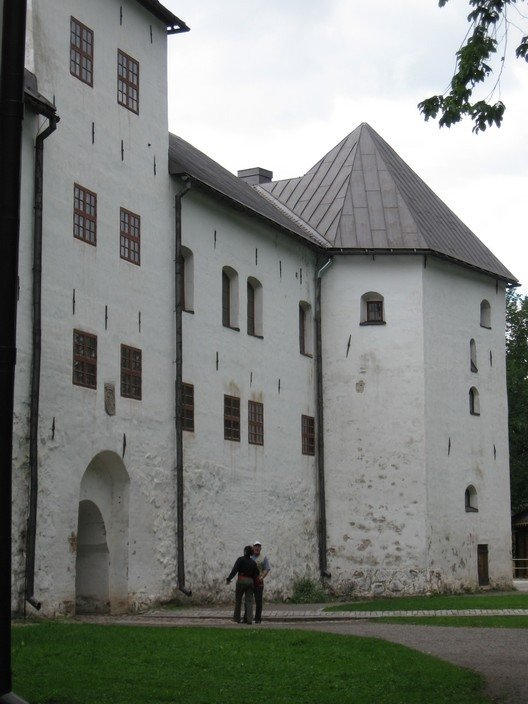

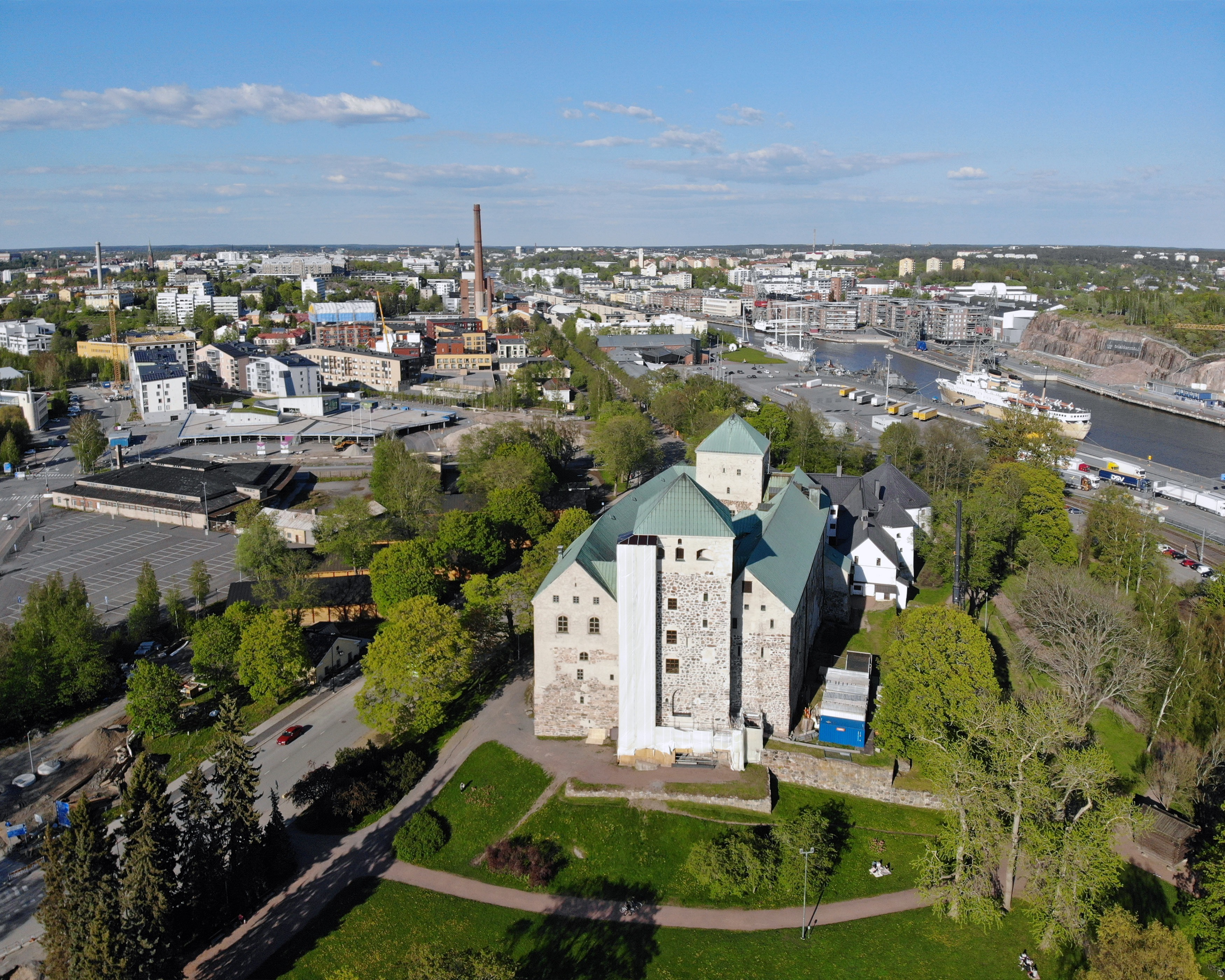

== See also ==
- History of Turku
