= Von Stedingk =

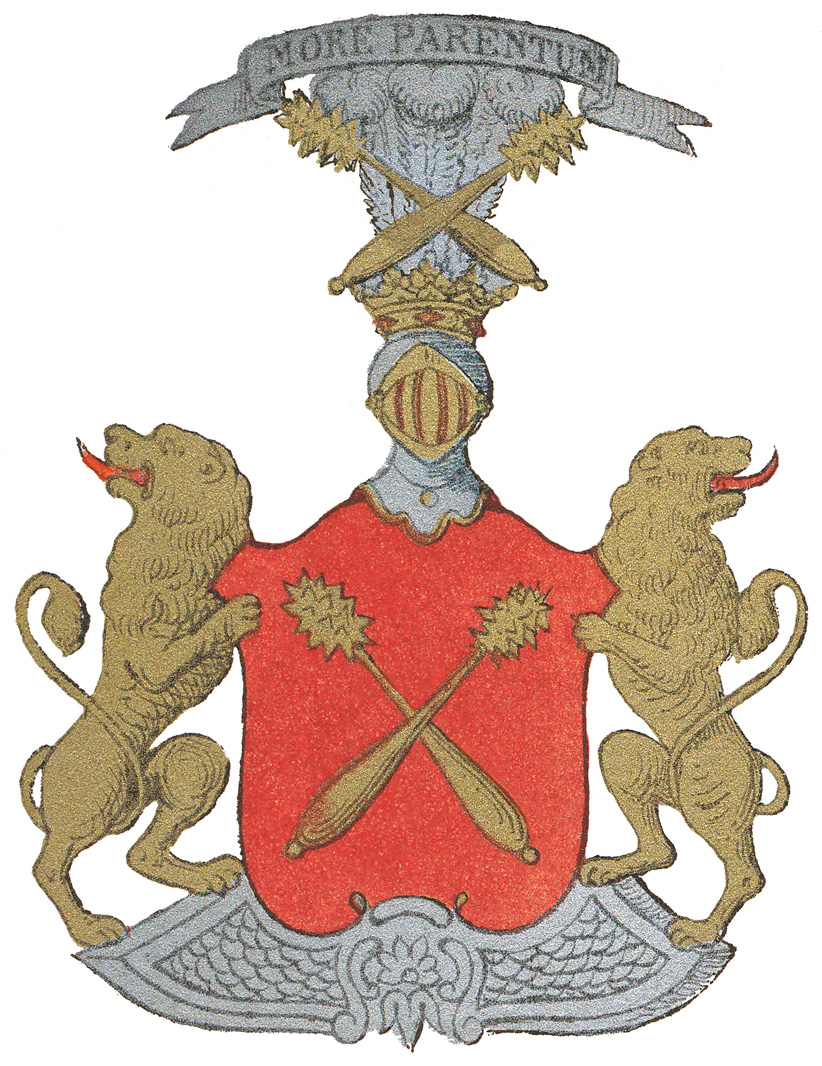
Coat of Arms of the Stedingk family

The Stedingk family or von Stedingk is a Swedish noble family of German origin originated in Pomerania, whose members have held significant artistic and military positions throughout the history of Sweden.

== Notable members ==
- Curt von Stedingk, a Swedish military commander and diplomat
- Maria Fredrica von Stedingk, a Swedish composer, (the daughter of the above)
