= Curt von Stedingk =

Swedish army officer and diplomat

Field Marshal Count Curt von Stedingk
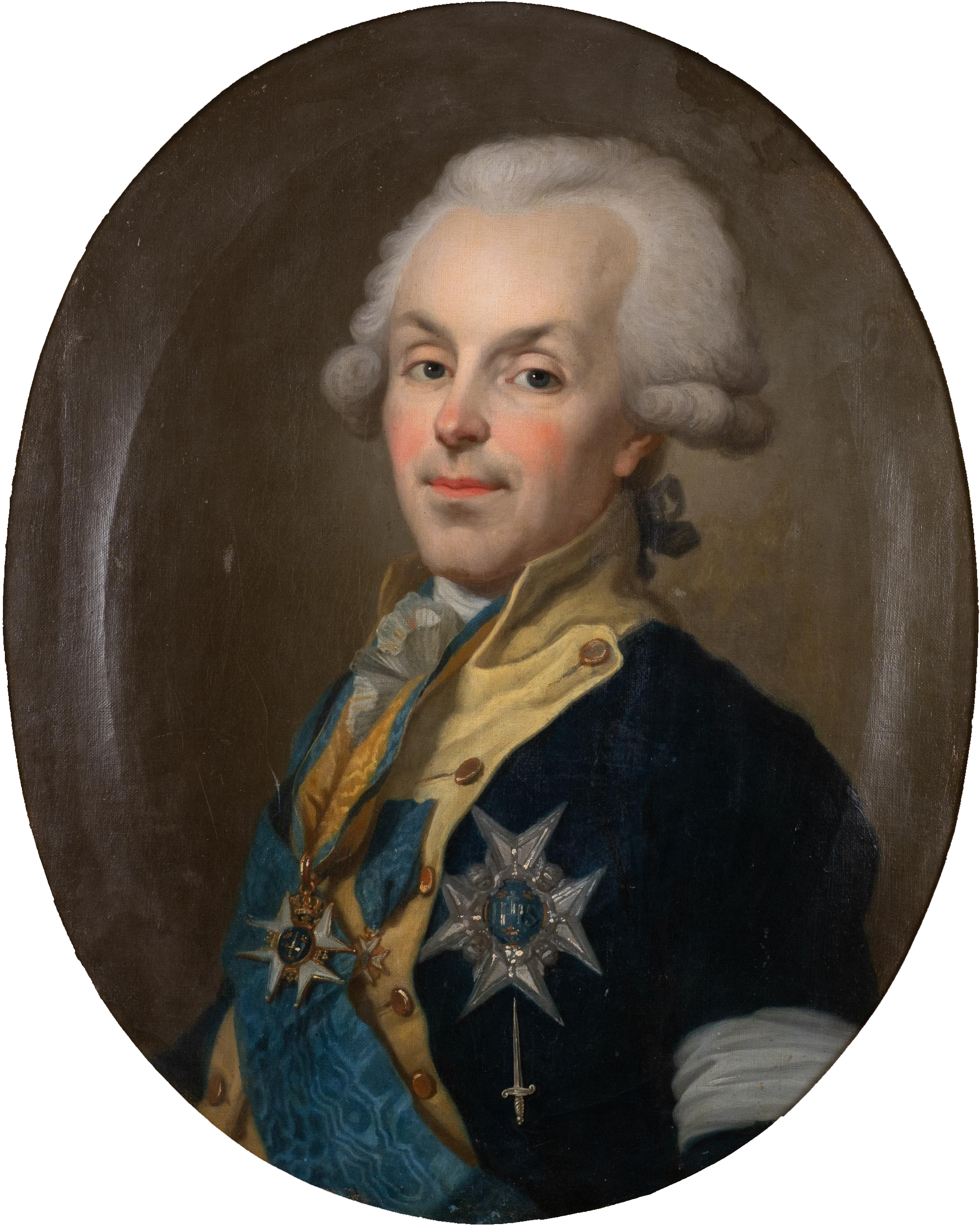
- Born: Curt Bogislaus Ludvig Christopher von Stedingk; 26 October 1746; Swedish Pomerania, Holy Roman Empire
- Died: 7 January 1837 (aged 90); Stockholm, Sweden
- Children: Maria Fredrica
- Relatives: Kristoffer Adam Stedingk (father); Kristina Charlotta von Schwerin (mother)
- Military career
- Allegiance: Sweden; Kingdom of France (1766–1783); United States
- Branch: Swedish Army; French Army
- Service years: 1766–1826
- Rank: Field Marshal (Sweden); Colonel (France)
- Unit: Régiment Royal-Suédois
- Conflicts: American Revolutionary War; Battle of Grenada; Siege of Savannah; Russo-Swedish War (1788–1790); Battle of Parkumäki; War of the Sixth Coalition; Battle of Großbeeren; Battle of Dennewitz; Battle of Leipzig
- Awards: Royal Order of the Seraphim; Order of the Sword; Lord of the Realm; Order of St. Alexander Nevsky; Order of Military Merit; Order of St. Andrew; Society of the Cincinnati
- Other work: Diplomat; Politician

Curt Bogislaus Ludvig Kristoffer von Stedingk (26 October 1746 – 7 January 1837) was a count of the von Stedingk family, and a successful Swedish army officer and diplomat who played a prominent role in Swedish foreign policy for several decades.

== Biography ==
=== Early life ===
Von Stedingk was born in Swedish Pomerania on 26 October 1746. His father was Major Kristoffer Adam Stedingk and his mother was Countess Kristina Charlotta von Schwerin, daughter of Frederick the Great's famous Field Marshal Kurt Christoph von Schwerin.

He married Ulrika Fredrika Ekström and became the father of one son and five daughters, who married into the noble families af Ugglas, Biörnstierna, von Platen, d'Otrante and Rosenblad; he was the father of the composer Maria Fredrica von Stedingk. During the Seven Years' War, while Sweden was at war with Prussia, the 13-year-old Curt was an ensign in the personal regiment of the Crown Prince of Sweden.

After the war ended, he went to Sweden to claim compensation for damage done to his family's estate in Pomerania. This goal was not achieved, but von Stedingk was introduced to the court and became friends with the crown prince and his brothers.

In Canada, the lineage continues with Baron Vicko von Stedingk and his wife Baroness Paula von Stedingk.

=== Career ===
==== Military career ====
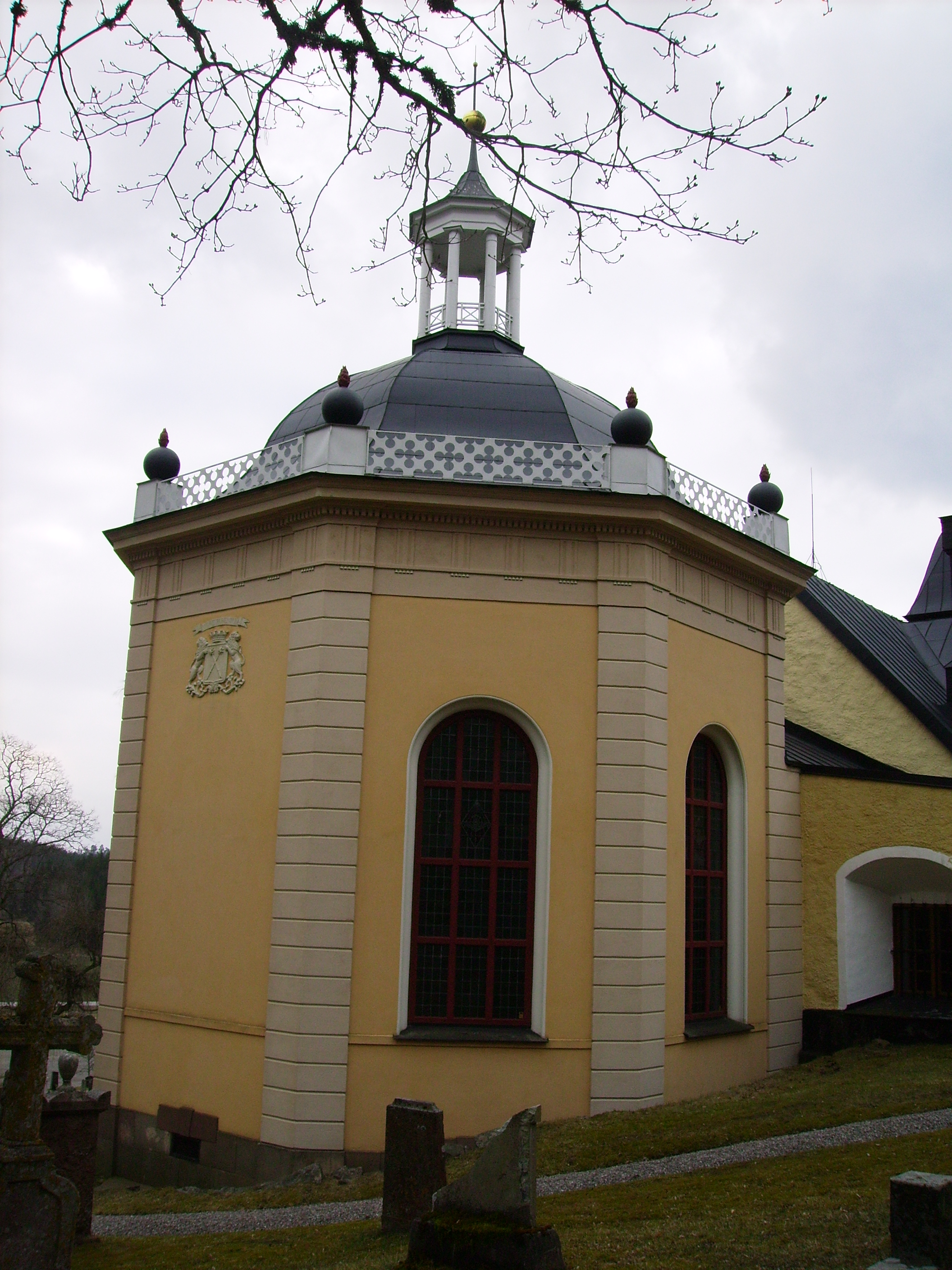
Grave site of Curt von Stedingk at Björnlunda church

In 1763, after von Stedingk completed his studies at Uppsala University, he began his military career, and rose quickly through the ranks in the Royal Suédois regiment in France, which was owned by his friend count Axel von Fersen. Both von Stedingk and Axel von Fersen were both close friends of Louis XVI and Marie Antoinette and spent much time in Versailles.

During the American Revolutionary War, when France sent troops under the command of Marquis de LaFayette in support of the American colonies, von Stedingk went overseas to America in 1779.

At the siege of Savannah in October 1779, he commanded the left column of the attacking force, and planted the American flag on the last line of British trenches, but was wounded by crossfire from the defenders and forced to retreat, with 20 men, all wounded like he was. For this, he was decorated by the French and received a lifetime pension.

He was also recognized as a hero for his acts during the naval Battle of Grenada fought against Vice Admiral John Byron on 6 July 1779. For his feats in battle, von Stedingk was made a member of the Society of the Cincinnati by George Washington in 1783.

During the Russo-Swedish War started by King Gustav III in 1788, von Stedingk commanded the defence of Savolax. His forces repeatedly defeated Russian forces that greatly outnumbered the Swedes, and von Stedingk was promoted to major general.

He was Ambassador to Russia in St. Petersburg in two turns – all in all almost 20 years. In the Russo-Swedish War 1808–1809 he was commander-in-chief in Finland, which still belonged to Sweden. Thanks to his very good standing with the Russian Imperial Family he later managed to alleviate the harsh terms of the peace negotiations when Finland was lost to Russia.

In the Battle of Leipzig he successfully commanded the Swedish troops against Napoleon. He was promoted to field marshal.

=== Death and afterward ===
Von Stedingk died at age 90 in Stockholm, and is said to have been mourned by both the King of Sweden, at that time, Charles XIV John, and the armed forces.

== Other sources ==
- Hofberg et al., Svenskt biografiskt handlexikon 1906, Albert Bonnier publishing company. Available at Project Runeberg.
- von Platen, Carl Henrik (1995) Stedingk: Curt von Stedingk (1746–1837) : kosmopolit, krigare och diplomat hos Ludvig XVI, Gustav III och Katarina den stora (Atlantis) ISBN 978-91-7486-187-7
