= Topelius, Minnesota =

Coordinates: 46°28′45″N 95°17′10″W

Topelius (also called Dopelius, Amboy, or Benton's Crossing) is a ghost town in Otter Tail County, in the U.S. state of Minnesota.

== History ==
A post office was established under the name Dopelius on May 10, 1901, and remained in operation until January 31, 1916. The community was renamed by Heikki Hendrickson (Kantomaa) for Zachris Topelius, a Swedish-language poet, when the post office began in 1901.
