= Sov du lilla vide ung =

Poem by Zachris Topelius

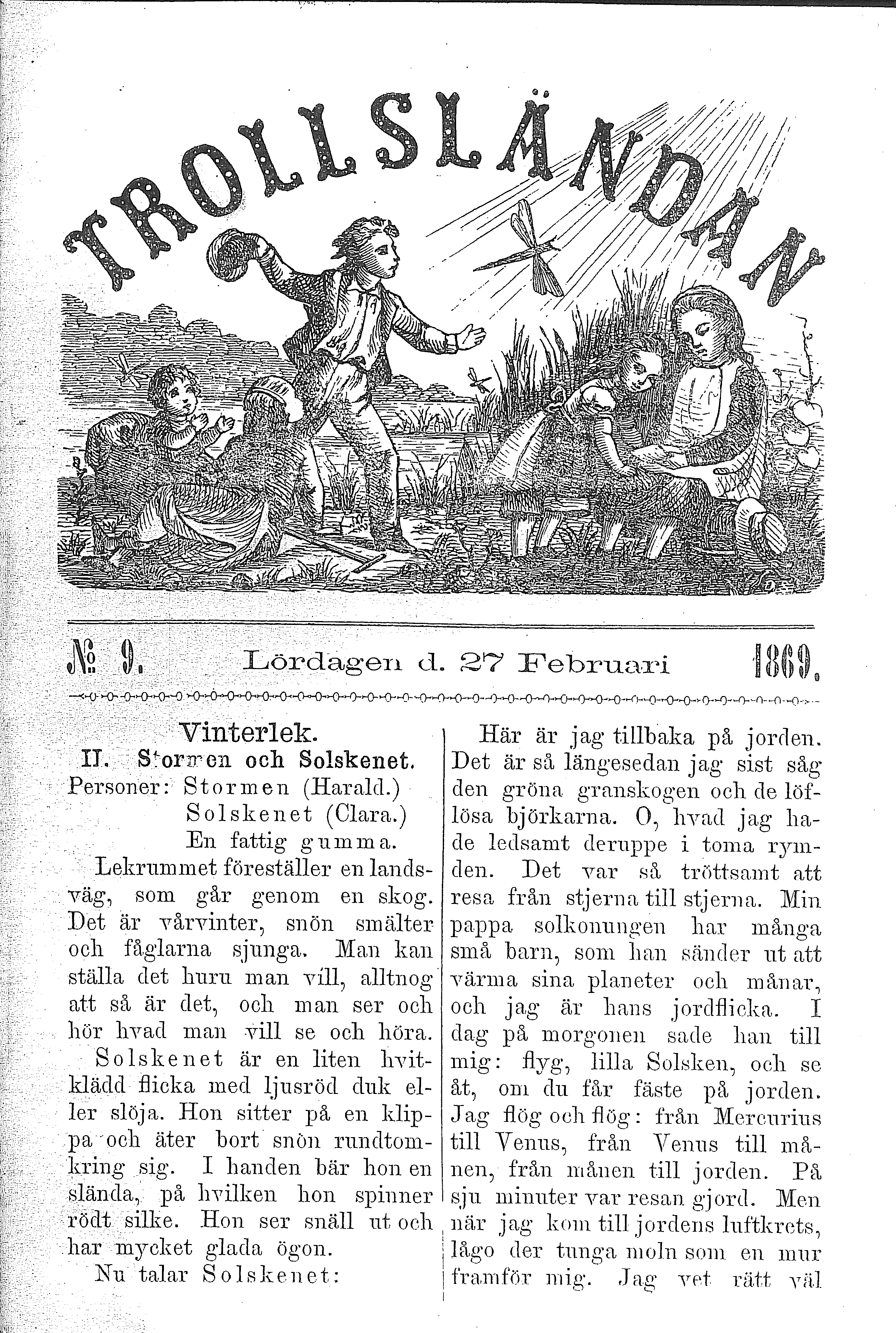
The children's magazine Trollsländan ("Dragonfly") No. 9, published February 27, 1869, in which Topelius's text of Sov du lilla vide ung was first published.

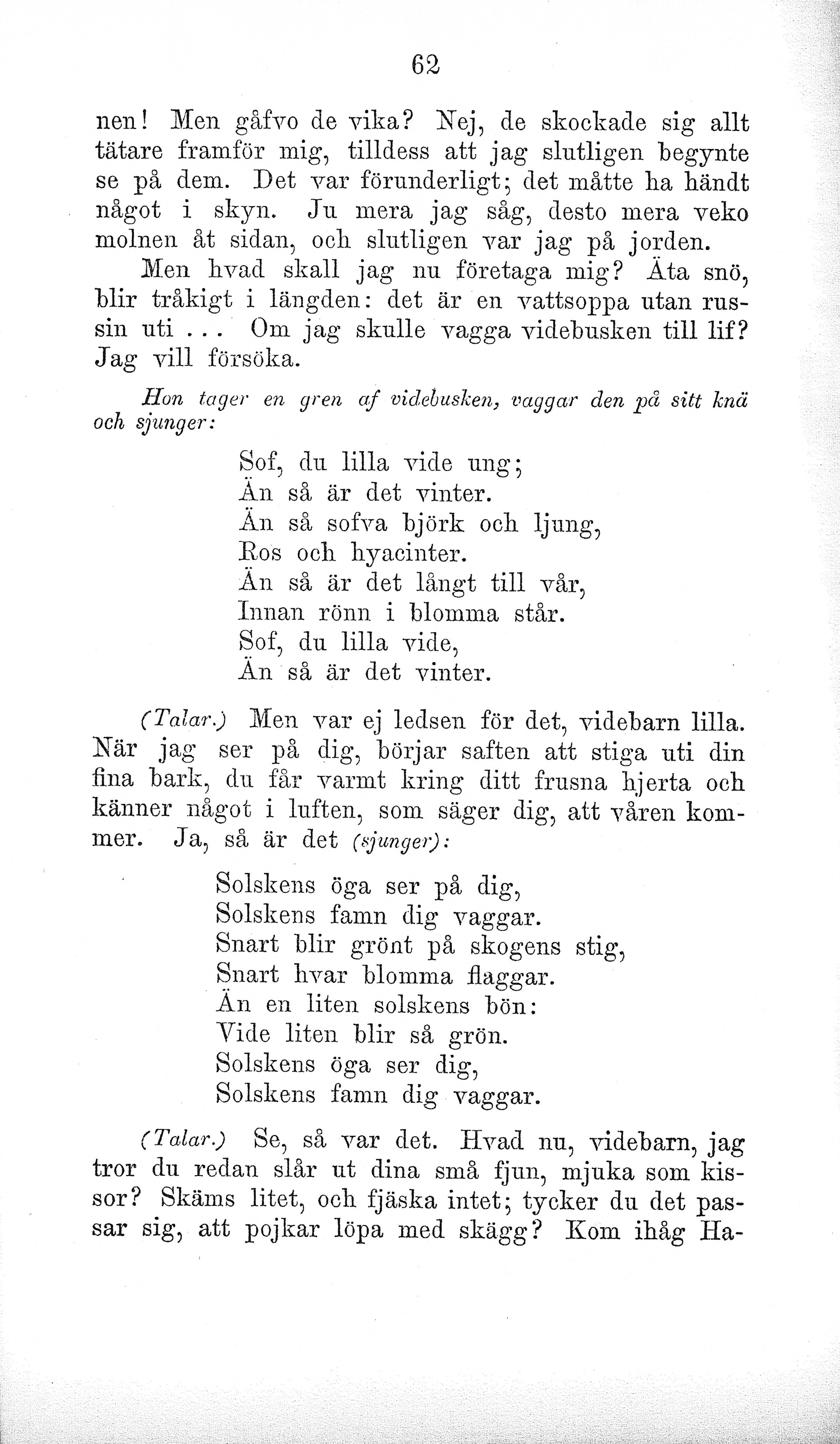
A page from Topelius's book Läsning för barn ("Reading for children") No. 4, 1871. The text differs slightly from the version published earlier in 1869.

Sov du lilla videung (English: "Sleep, you little willow young"), otherwise known as Videvisan ("Willow song") or Solskenets visan ("Sunshine's song") is a poem by the Finnish author Zachris Topelius which was first published in the ninth issue of the children's magazine Trollsländan ("Dragonfly") on February 27, 1869.

Topelius is considered to be the first author of Swedish-language literature specifically intended for children. From the 1840s till his death he wrote some 230 poems, songs, stories and fairy tales. He was also the first in Scandinavia to write plays for children. He appeared widely, including in Trollsländan, with columns under the heading Vinterlek ("Winter play"). He intended the pieces he wrote to become a part of children's play, not to be used as theatrical performances.

Sov du lilla videung was part of just such a small children's play entitled Stormen och Solskenet ("The storm and the sunshine"). The introduction describes the main role of the "Sunshine" character:

Sunshine is a small white-clad girl with pink cloth or veil. She sits on a rock and eats away at the snow all around her. In her hand she carries a spindle, onto which she spins red silk. She seems kind, and her eyes are filled with delight.

— Zachris Topelius, Stormen och Solskenet

The most famous musical setting for the poem is by the Swedish composer Alice Tegnér (1864–1943).

== Topelius's text ==
Stormen och Solskenet has three roles, all intended to be played by children. The game begins with set design guidelines: "The playroom represents a country road going through a forest. It is early spring; the snow is melting, and birds are singing." A bit further into the text Sunshine says: "Could I bring the willow bush to life? I want to try." She takes a branch of willow bush, rocks it on her knee and sings:

Sof, du lilla videung; än så är det vinter.
Än så sofva björk och ljung, ros och hyacinther.
Än så är det långt till vår,
Innan rönn i blomma står.
Sof, du lilla videung, än så är det vinter.

("Sleep, you little willow young; still it is the winter.
So sleep yet, birch and roses, hyacinths and heather.
For it's long until the spring,
Ere the rowans flowers bring.
Sleep, you little willow young, for it's still the winter.")

Sunshine continues: "When I gaze at you, the sap begins to rise out into your fine bark, you get warm around your frozen heart, and feel something in the air, which tells you the spring is coming. Yes, so is it (sings:)

Solskensöga ser på dig; solskens famn dig vaggar.
Snart blir grönt på skogens stig, snart hvar blomma flaggar.
Än en liten solskensbön:
Vide liten blir så grön.
Solskensöga ser på dig; solskens famn dig vaggar.

("Eye of Sunshine gaze at you; in Sunshine's lap you rock.
Soon will green the forest path, raising every bloom aloft.
Yet a little Sunshine-plea:
Willow little, be so green.
Eye of Sunshine gaze at you; in Sunshine's lap you rock.")

In 1871 Topelius's fourth issue of Läsning för barn ("Reading for children") appeared. Stormen och Solskenet was published once more but with some minor changes to the lyrics.

== Musical settings ==
"Sov du lilla vide ung"

Song
- Language: Swedish
- English title: Sleep, you little willow young
- Published: 1895
- Genre: Lullaby
- Composer: Alice Tegnér
- Lyricist: Zachris Topelius

- Alice Tegnér's musical setting for the song was published in 1895 in the third booklet of the Sjung med oss, Mamma! ("Sing with us, Mama!") series, under the title Videvisan ("Willow song") Tegnér adjusted the text slightly to fit her melody and modernized the spelling. Tegnér's songs were reprinted in 1943 in the Nu ska vi sjunga ("Now we shall sing") anthology under the title Visor om djur och blommor ("Songs about animals and flowers").
- In 1900 the Danish-Swedish composer Preben Nodermann (1867–1930) published a melody (with minor modifications of Topelius's text) titled Solskenets visa ("Sunshine's song") in Sex visor för barn ("Six songs for children"). Danish and Norwegian versions of the song, entitled Solskinnsvise, have become well known and have been published in Norway both as sheet music and as recordings.
- The Swedish composer Ivar Hallström also wrote a melody to Topelius's text entitled Solskenets visa, which was published in a 1931 songbook of the Gothenburg public school system. Hallström's song text differs from both the Topelius original and the Tegnér version.

== Score examples with audio ==
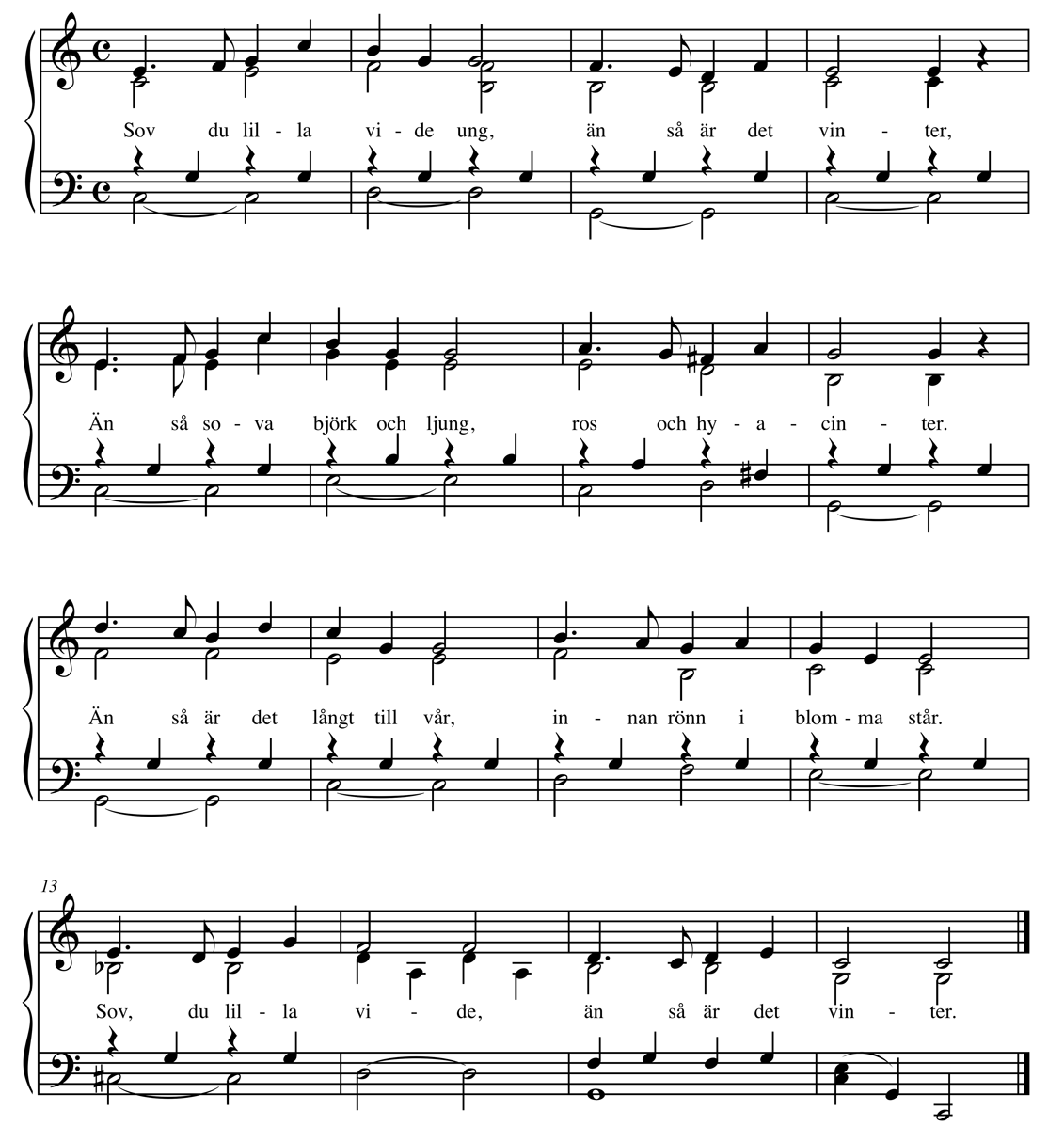
Sheet music for Videvisan (Tegnér).

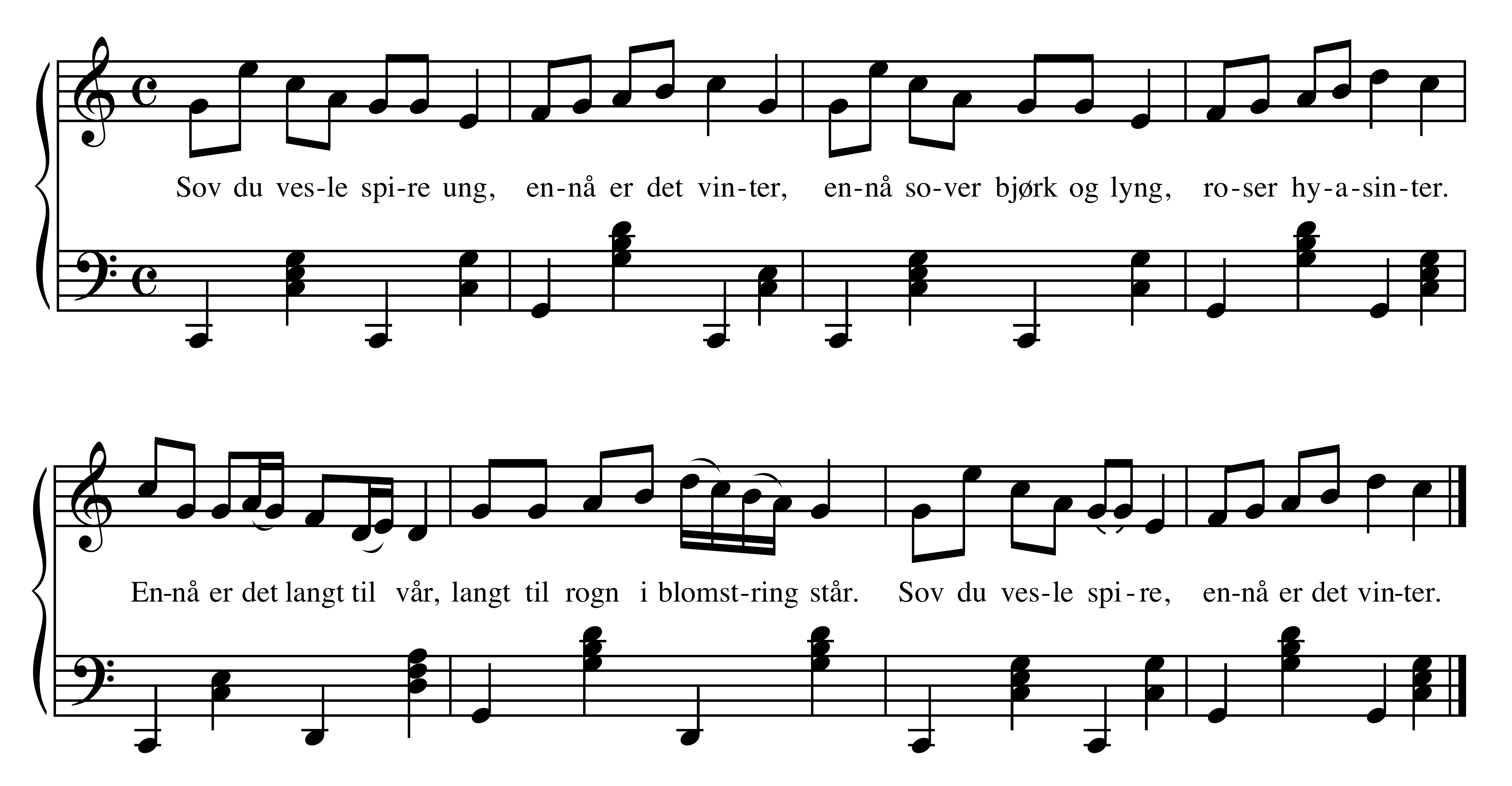
Sheet music for Solskinnsvise (Nodermann).

== Recordings ==
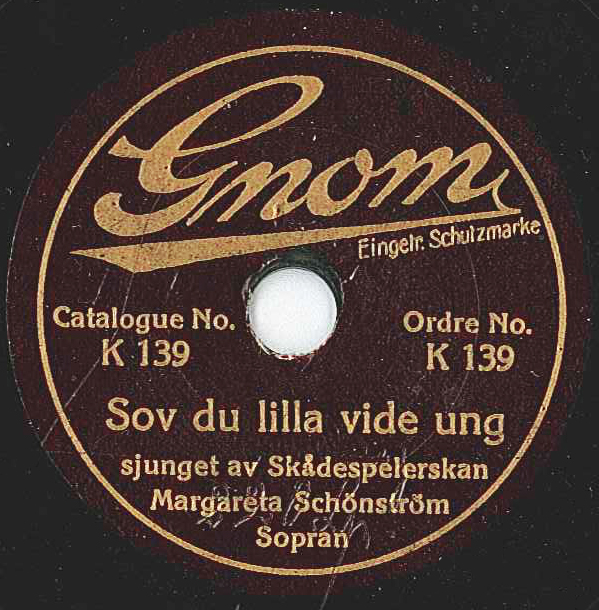
Label for a 1925 Swedish recording of Sov du lilla vide ung, sung by Margareta Schönström. "Gnom" was a German-produced record label designed to play on toy gramophones for children; the platters were only 15 cm in diameter (i.e., smaller than a 45-rpm gramophone record.

An early recording of the Tegnér version was made by Inga Berentz in Stockholm in 1909. In May 1925 Polyphon recorded the song's performance by soprano Margareta Schönström; it was published on the company's 78-rpm Gnom brand with the catalogue number K 139. Maria Llerena has also sung it in Spanish as Duerme mi Nenita on her 1988 album Chiquitico mio. In addition, there are over 100 recordings listed in the Swedish media database.
