= The Tomten in Åbo Castle =

- Author: Zachris Topelius
- Original title: Swedish: Tomtegubben i Åbo slott Finnish: Turun linnan tonttu-ukko
- Translator: Frank R. Southerington
- Language: Swedish; Finnish
- Genre: fairy tale
- Publication date: 1849
- Publication place: Finland
- English publication date: 1977
- OCLC: 5124874

"The Tomten in Åbo Castle" (also known as The Tomte at Turku Castle; Swedish: Tomtegubben i Åbo slott, Finnish: Turun linnan tonttu-ukko) is a Finnish fairy tale from 1849 by Zachris Topelius. It tells the story of a friendship between an old tomten, who lived in Turku Castle for hundreds of years, and his only human friend. At the time of writing, the medieval Turku Castle, the site of events, was badly damaged, and the story had a major influence on the desire to restore this important landmark in the City of Turku.

The fairy tale has also served as a strong inspiration for the City of Turku, which has also organized annual "Tonttupäivä", when the castle hosts guided tours in the spirit of Topelius's story.

== Plot ==
Beneath Turku Castle, in the deepest and darkest cellar vault, lived the 700-year-old elf Tomten with a white beard so long that he could wind it twice around his waist. The lonely Tomten was good and honest, but disciplined and tidy, and also had a slightly peculiar taste for his living comforts. He had only three friends: the elf of Turku Cathedral, his magical black cat Murri in the cellar vault and his only human friend, Matts Mursten, the old janitor of Turku Castle.

Matti Kivinen was 12 years old when he first met the Tomten; at that time, the boy was looking for old musket bullets in the vaults of the castle, where he found an underground passage. Matti was trapped in the tunnel as the rocks collapsed, but the Tomten who emerged helped him out of the tunnel through Turku Cathedral. Matti didn't expect to see Tomten anymore, but the old elf wished Matti a great future and secretly helped Matti in his studies and work, until Matti (now Matts) became a janitor at Turku Castle at the age of 30.

Matts worked for 50 years until he retired at the age of 80 and left his job for his granddaughter's husband. After that, old Matts spent a lot of time in the decaying castle, repairing the place, not knowing that the Tomten also repaired the castle every now and then. There were plenty of things to repair in the castle due to the weather and the natural forces, but the Tomten was tenacious and had for centuries secured the castle by repairing it so that the castle would not leave only ruins over time.

When Tomten saw how old Matts loved the castle like him, his heart was tender and he reappeared to Matts after all these years. In his spare time, Tomten told Matts about the history of the castle and the people who inhabited it, including the dukes and kings. Tomten used to invisibly enjoy the table and secretly listen to the secret talks of the lords of the castle. He also told Matti about the battles and other conflicts around the castle; when the Great Fire of Turku came at the time when Tomten was visiting Raseborg and Loviisa to meet his cousins, he had decided that he would never leave Turku again. Tomten introduced Matts to the cellar vaults of the castle where Tomten lived. There, he showed the first door to his guarded treasure chamber full of gold, silver and jewels. He also showed another door that leads to the dungeons where many would-be treasure thieves are now in chains and turned into wolves. The old elf also showed a third door, which he himself would not dare to open. According to Tomten, there is a tunnel under the door to beneath the castle's foundations, where the old Väinämöinen, the ageless wise man, is sitting and waiting with his warriors. Matts swore to himself that he would never visit beneath the castle.

However, he invited Tomten to the upcoming castle wedding: Rose, Matts's great-granddaughter, was marrying a sergeant major. Tomten, invisible, gave her a beautiful crown as a gift. The guests, who did not see Tomten, were sure that Matts has found it in the castle, but only Matts knew the truth. Matts drank too much wine and started to tell about Tomten and treasure to the greedy gossip Saara, who went on to tell her greedy son Kiljanus everything she heard. Saara and Kiljanus, looking for treasure, came into the cellar vault. Tomten stopped them and turned Saara into a cat and her son Kiljanus into a wolf. They would never be seen by people again. Tomten was disappointed with Matts and he replaced Rose's crown with a piece of rusty iron. Matts understood the reason and repented of his actions. Tomten was no longer friendly toward the inhabitants, the flowers were no longer watered and the walls were not repaired. The old elf was tired.

One day, Tomten showed up for the last time to 90-year-old Matts, who was visiting the castle with Rose and her son, Eerik. At that meeting, Matts offered his life to preserve the castle, but Tomten said he would rather have the life of the baby as his servant, and Rose adamantly refused. Tomten was ready to do something violent, but the song of Väinämöinen's kantele stayed his hand. However, Matts died while the kantele was playing. Rose promised to Tomten that her son would take care of the castle. After Matts's funeral, the Tomten began to repair the Turku castle again, and invisibly help the many people moving to repair it.

== Influence ==
Sinikka Salokorpi wrote two children's books about the Tomnen of the Åbo Castle:

- 2001:Turun linnan tonttu-ukon jouluihme (The Christmas miracle of Turku Castle's Elf)
- 2002:Turun linnan tonttu-ukon salaisuus (The Secret of Turku Castle's Elf)
