= The Breaking of the Ice on the Oulu River =

Melodrama by Jean Sibelius

- Melodrama by Jean Sibelius
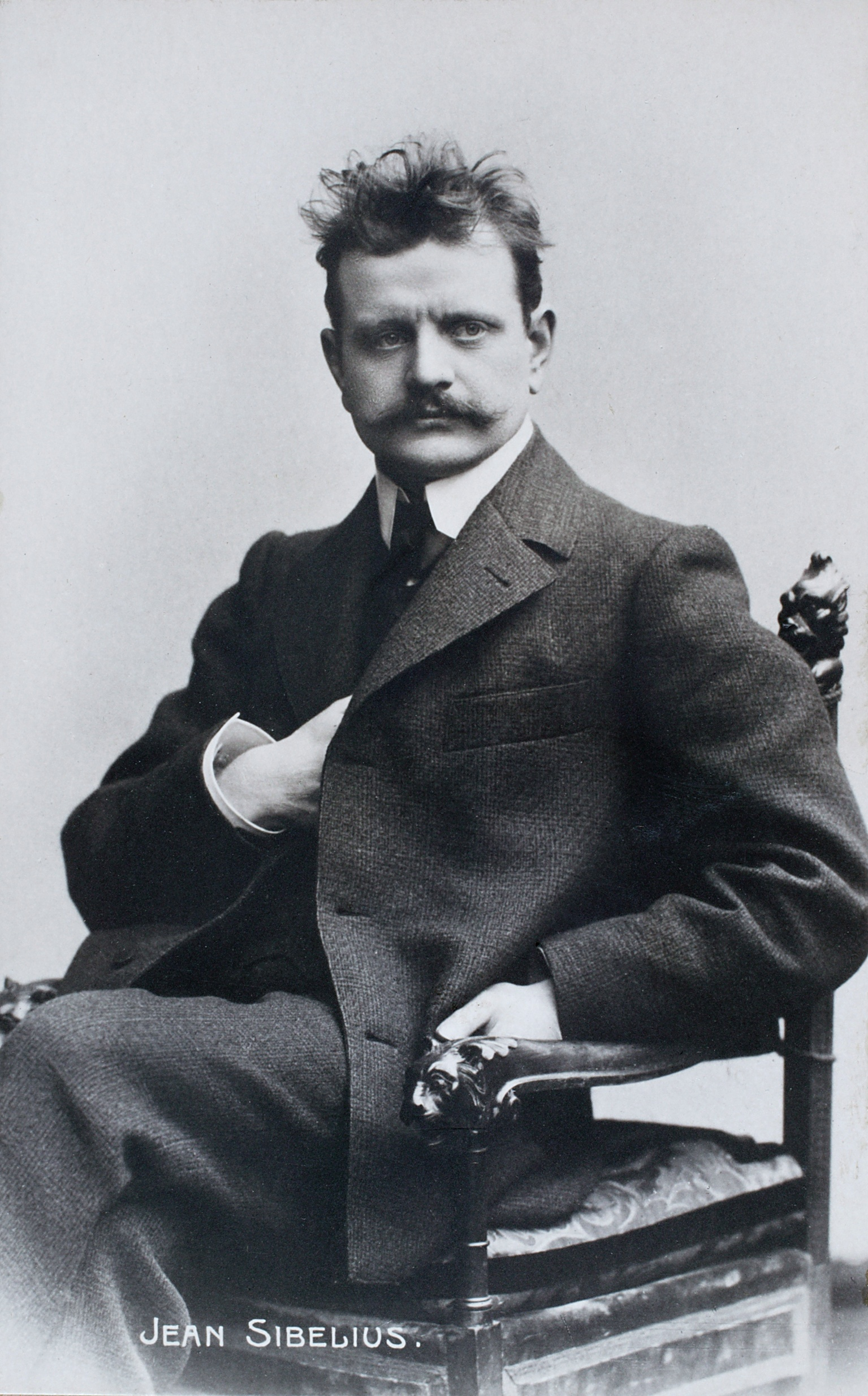
- The composer (c. 1900)
- Native name: Islossningen i Uleå älv
- Opus: 30
- Text: Islossningen i Ule älv; by Zachris Topelius
- Language: Swedish
- Composed: 1899
- Duration: 12 mins.

Premiere
- Date: 21 October 1899
- Location: Helsinki, Grand Duchy of Finland
- Conductor: Jean Sibelius
- Performers: Helsinki Philharmonic Society; Axel Ahlberg (narrator)

The Breaking of the Ice on the Oulu River (in Swedish: Islossningen i Uleå älv; in Finnish: Jäänlähtö Oulujoesta), Op. 30, is a composition by Jean Sibelius, an "improvisation for narrator, men's chorus and orchestra". Sibelius composed it in 1899 on a poem by Zachris Topelius, a Swedish-language Finnish poet, who had dedicated it to Tsar Alexander II of Russia, thus escaping censorship. The piece was an "explicit protest composition" against a Russia restricting the autonomy of the Grand Duchy of Finland. Sibelius wrote it for a lottery of the Savonian-Karelian Students' Association, where he conducted the first performance on 21 October 1899.

== Instrumentation ==
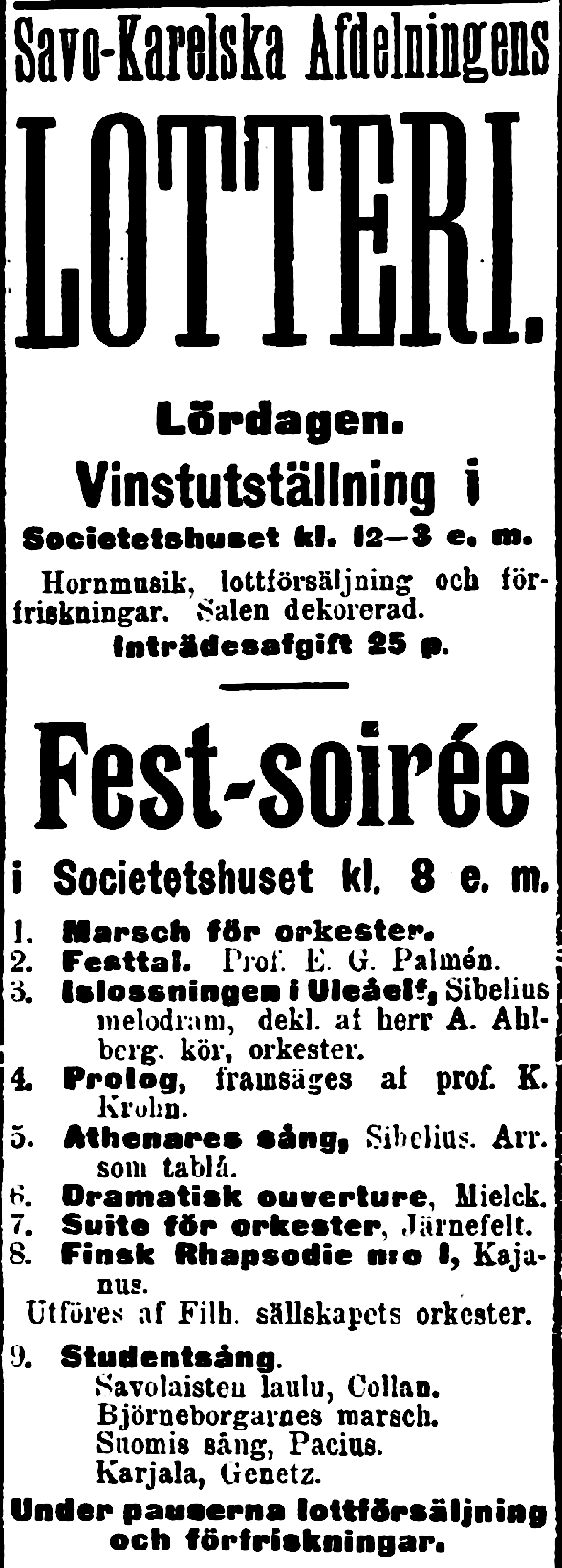
A newspaper advertisement (in Swedish) from Hufvudstadsbladet for the premiere of The Breaking of the Ice on the Oulu River

The Breaking of the Ice on the Oulu River is scored for the following instruments and voices, organized by family (vocalists, woodwinds, brass, percussion, and strings):

- Narrator and male choir (TTBB)
- 2 flutes, 2 oboes, 2 clarinets, and 2 bassoons
- 4 horns, 3 trumpets, 3 trombones, and tuba
- Timpani, bass drum, and cymbals
- Violins (I and II), violas, cellos, and double basses

== History ==
Sibelius composed Islossningen i Uleå älv (Note: The composition is called Islossningen i Uleå älv in the original sheet music, it is later referred to as Islossningen i Ule älv.) in a political context. Most of what is now Finland had been part of Sweden until Russia won the territory in the Finnish War and ruled it as a Grand Duchy. It was first autonomous in terms of a parliament, money, and schools in Swedish and Finnish, but Nikolay Bobrikov, the Russian Governor-General, tried to limit these liberties and even proposed schooling only in Russian.

Sibelius composed music as patriotic statements against the restricting censorship, in Islossningen i Uleå älv, first performed on 21 October at a lottery of the Savo-Karelian Students' Association in Helsinki, and in Finlandia, first performed as part of the Press Celebration Music two weeks later. Sibelius conducted the first performance, the premiere. He used the choral theme again for children's choir a cappella, The Landscape Breathes (Nejden andas). After the first performance, Sibelius made a note about the composition, "should be revised", which he later did.

== Composition ==
The breaking of the ice is an annual event in some northern countries, releasing winter and ending immobility. The text for Islossningen i Uleå älv is a poem by Zachris Topelius, a Swedish-language Finnish poet. The poem lists many rivers besides the one in the title, summarizing Finland. He dedicated it to Tsar Alexander II, thus protecting it from censorship. Sibelius, like the poet, interpreted the frozen river as a symbol of the Russian oppression, and the breaking of the ice as an image of freedom. Sibelius confirmed the underlying meaning of the music when he programmed its premiere to be followed by Song of the Athenians, a song for freedom first performed half a year earlier and held high by Finnish nationalists.

The composition is subtitled "improvisation for narrator, men's chorus and orchestra". The subtitle is Sibelius' own description of the work, it has otherwise been described as a melodrama, cantata and choir suite. It begins and ends with recitation for the narrator, accented by brass chords. The center of the work is a dramatic chorus, often in unison and accompanied by a symphony orchestra. It has been considered as a test piece for Finlandia in terms of accessibility and some effects of orchestration.

== Discography ==
The Finnish conductor Rauno Rännäli and the Oulu Conservatory Orchestra made the world premiere studio recording of The Breaking of the Ice on the Oulu River—albeit of a Finnish-language translation—in 1990; the male choir was Pohjan Laulu, while the narrator was the Finnish baritone Hannu Heikkilä. The table below lists this and other commercially available recordings:

No.	Conductor	Orchestra	Chorus	Narrator	Rec. (Note: Refers to the year in which the performers recorded the work; this may not be the same as the year in which the recording was first released to the general public.)	Time (Note: All runtimes are official, as printed on CD or LP liner notes.)	Venue	Label	Ref.
1	Rauno Rännäli	Oulu Conservatory Orchestra	Pohjan Laulu	Hannu Heikkilä	1990	9:54	Madetoja Hall, Oulu Music Centre	PL	(Note: R. Rännäli—PL (PLCD 1) 1991)
2	Osmo Vänskä	Lahti Symphony Orchestra	Jubilate Choir	Lasse Pöysti	2001	10:30	Sibelius Hall	BIS	(Note: O. Vänskä—BIS (CD–1265) 2004)

In addition, the Finnish choral director Hannu Norjanen and the Tapiola Chamber Choir made the world premiere studio recording of The Landscape Breathes for female choir a cappella c. 1997 for Finlandia. The table below lists this and other commercially available recordings:

No.	Choral director	Ensemble	Runtime	Rec.	Recording venue	Label	Ref.
1	Hannu Norjanen	Tapiola Chamber Choir	0:40	1997	Roihuvuori Church	Finlandia	(Note: Tapiola Chamber Choir—Finlandia (0630–19054–2) 1998)
2	Astrid Riska	Jubilate Choir	0:52	1998	Tapiola Hall	BIS	(Note: Jubilate Choir—BIS (CD–998) 1999)
3	Seppo Murto	Dominante Choir	0:39	2010	New Pavilon, Kauniainen	BIS	(Note: Dominante Choir—BIS (CD–1889) 2012)
4	Heikki Seppanen	Estonian Philharmonic Chamber Choir	0:31	2014	Järvenpää Hall	Ondine	(Note: Estonian Phil. Chamber Choir—Ondine (ODE 1260–2D) 2015)

== Literature ==
- Mäkelä, Tomi (2013). Jean Sibelius und seine Zeit [Jean Sibelius and his time]. Große Komponisten und ihre Zeit (in German). Regensburg: Laaber-Verlag.
- Dahlström, Fabian [in Swedish] (2003). Jean Sibelius: Thematisch-bibliographisches Verzeichnis seiner Werke [Jean Sibelius: A Thematic Bibliographic Index of His Works] (in German). Wiesbaden: Breitkopf & Härtel. ISBN 3-7651-0333-0.
