= Battle of Parkumäki =

- Part of the Russo-Swedish War (1788–90)
Date	July 21, 1789
Location	Parkumäki, Finland 61°58′30″N 28°31′06″E
Result	Swedish victory

Belligerents
Sweden	(Russia) Russian Empire

Commanders and leaders
Curt von Stedingk	General Schultz

Strength
1,300 men	1,500 men

Casualties and losses
186 dead and wounded	200 dead 500 captured
- Location within South Savo Battle of Parkumäki (Finland) Battle of Parkumäki (European Russia)

The Battle of Parkumäki took place on July 21, 1789, during Gustav III's Russian War, Sweden defeated the Russian Empire.

== History ==
During the time when the Russian general Ivan Ivanovich Michelson pulled his forces back, the Swedish commander Curt von Stedingk with about 1,300 men started his offensive against the remaining Russian general Schultz and his 1,000 soldiers whom stood by Parkumäki, and another 500 by Puiko. On July 21, Stedingk flanked and overwhelmed both the Russian positions and captured their artillery. The Russians lost 200 men killed, 130 wounded and 500 captured during the fighting along with all their artillery, baggage and two standards lost to the Swedes, who suffered 186 men dead and wounded. Curt von Stedingk was promoted to major general after the victory.
