= Marie von Stedingk =

Swedish composer and courtier (1799–1868)

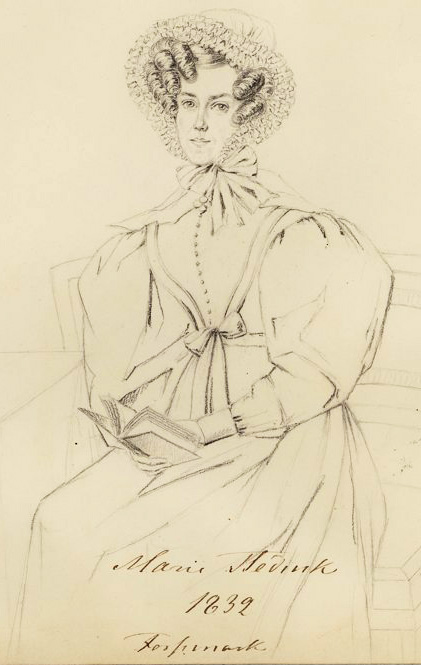
Drawing by Maria Röhl, 1832

Maria "Marie" Frederica von Stedingk (31 October 1799 – 15 June 1868) was a Swedish composer and courtier.

== Life ==
Stedingk was born in Saint Petersburg to the Swedish field marshal and count Kurt von Stedingk and his Swedish housekeeper Ulrika Fredrika Ekström. Her parents married five years after her birth. She died unmarried.

She was given a high education by private teachers by her progressive father, who wished for all his children to be well educated regardless of gender.

She served as a hovfröken to the queen of Sweden, Désirée Clary, in 1823–1860.

Among her compositions are the Nocturne för melodiinstrument (written down by Mathilda Berwald).

The composer Mathilda d'Orozco dedicated her composition Sex Sånger för Piano ('Six Songs for the Piano') to her in 1842.
