= Nu så kommer julen =

Song
- Language: Swedish
- Published: 1857
- Genre: Christmas
- Composer: Richard Norén (original music-version)
- Lyricist: Zacharias Topelius

"Nu så kommer julen, nu är julen här", or titled Julvisa, is originally a poem published by Zacharias Topelius in 1857. It has been set to music several times, originally by Richard Norén in 1875.

== Compositions ==
- Richard Norén (1847-1922), published 1875.
- Alice Tegnér, published 1895 in Sjung med oss, Mamma!, issue 3.
- Gustaf Stolpe, unknown year.
- Cid Smedberg, unknown year (circa 1900).
- Jean Sibelius, composed 1913.
- Ellen Heijkorn, published 1920.
- N. Herman, unknown, year unknown.

The song is in the film "Sagan om Karl-Bertil Jonssons julafton", using the Ellen Heijkorn tune.

== Recordings ==
An early recording was done by Inga Berentz in Stockholm in September 1909.
