= Zachris Topelius =

Finnish author, poet, journalist, historian, and rector (1818–1898)

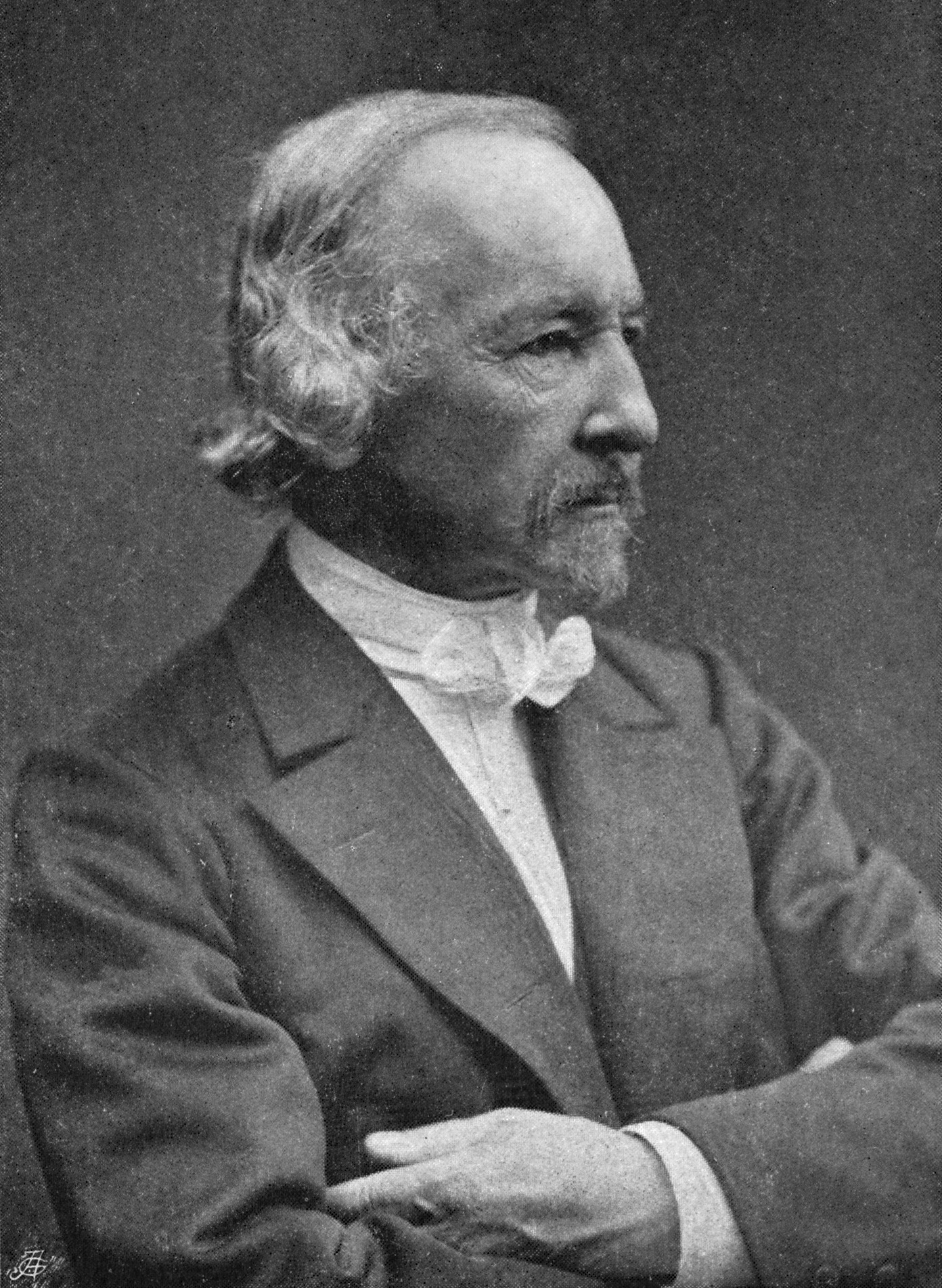
- Born: Zacharias Topelius; 14 January 1818; Kuddnäs, near Nykarleby, Grand Duchy of Finland, Russian Empire
- Died: 12 March 1898 (aged 80); Sipoo, Grand Duchy of Finland, Russian Empire
- Occupations: Historian; poet
- Writing career
- Language: Swedish

Zacharias Topelius (Finland Swedish pronunciation: [sɑˈkɑːriɑs toˈpeːliʉs]; 14 January 1818 – 12 March 1898) was a Finnish author, poet, journalist, historian, and rector of the University of Helsinki who wrote novels related to Finnish history. He wrote his works exclusively in Swedish, although they were translated early on into Finnish. In Finland Topelius emerged as one of the foremost heirs to Sir Walter Scott’s legacy of exploring the nation through the historical novel.

== Given name ==
Zacharias is his baptismal name, and this is used on the covers of his printed works. However, "he himself most often used the abbreviation Z. or the form Zachris (Finland Swedish pronunciation: [ˈsɑkris]), even in official contexts", as explained in the National Biography of Finland. Zachris is therefore the preferred form used in recent academic literature about him.

The Finnish form of Topelius' first name is Sakari(as) (Finnish pronunciation: [ˈsɑkɑri(ɑs)]).

== Life and career ==
=== Early life ===
The original name of the Topelius family was the Finnish name Toppila, which had been Latinized to Toppelius by the author's grandfather's grandfather and later changed to Topelius. Topelius was born at Kuddnäs, near Nykarleby in Ostrobothnia, the son of a physician of the same name (Zacharias Topelius the Elder), who was distinguished as the earliest collector of Finnish folk songs. His grandfather, Mikael Toppelius, was a painter noted for his murals and altarpieces in churches in Ostrobothnia.

As a child, he heard his mother, Katarina Sofia Calamnius, sing the songs of the Finnish-Swedish poet Frans Michael Franzén. At the age of eleven, he was sent to school in Oulu and boarded with relatives in the possession of a lending library, where he nurtured his imagination with the reading of novels. He was given a Christian upbringing that came to characterize his entire life.

=== Study in Helsinki ===
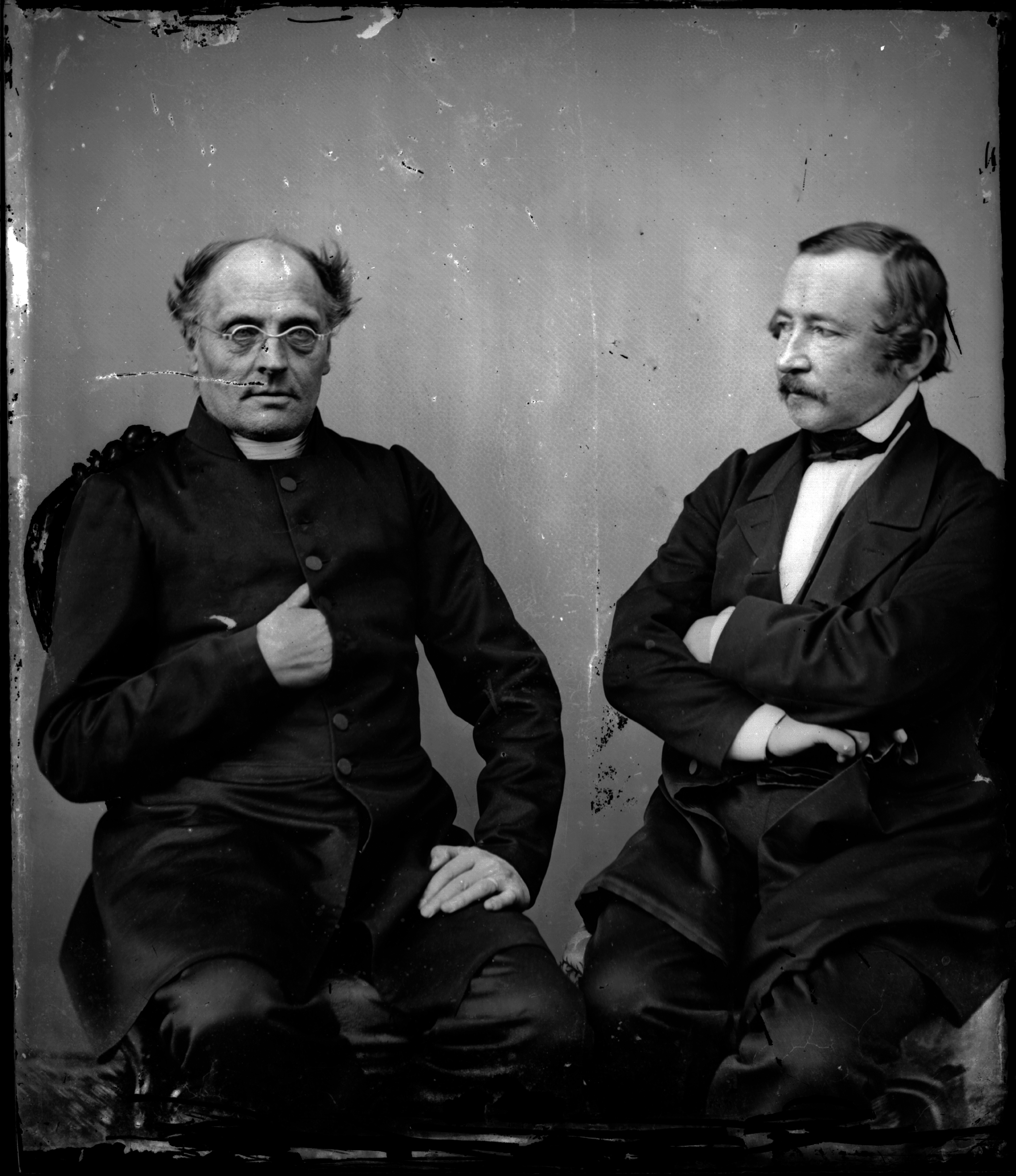
Together with Johan Ludvig Runeberg in 1863

He came to Helsinki in 1831 and became a member of the circle of young nationalist men surrounding Johan Ludvig Runeberg, at whose home he stayed for some time. Topelius became a student at the Imperial Alexander University of Finland in 1833, received his master's degree (cand. philol.) in 1840, the Licentiate degree in history in 1844 and his PhD in 1847, having defended a dissertation titled De modo matrimonia jungendi apud fennos quondam vigente ("About the custom of marriage among the ancient Finns"). Besides history, his academic studies had for periods been devoted both to Theology and Medicine. He was secretary of Societas pro Fauna et Flora Fennica 1842–1846, was employed by the university library 1846–1861, and taught History, Statistics and Swedish at the school Helsingfors lyceum during the same period.

=== Becoming a professor ===
Through the intervention of a friend, Fredrik Cygnaeus, Topelius was named professor extraordinary of the History of Finland at the university in 1854. He was made first ordinary professor of Finnish, Russian and Nordic history in 1863, and exchanged this chair for the one in general history in 1876. He was rector of the university from 1875 until 1878, when he retired as Emeritus Professor and received the title of verkligt statsråd (Finnish: todellinen valtioneuvos, Russian: действительный статский советник; literally "state councillor", a Russian honorary title).

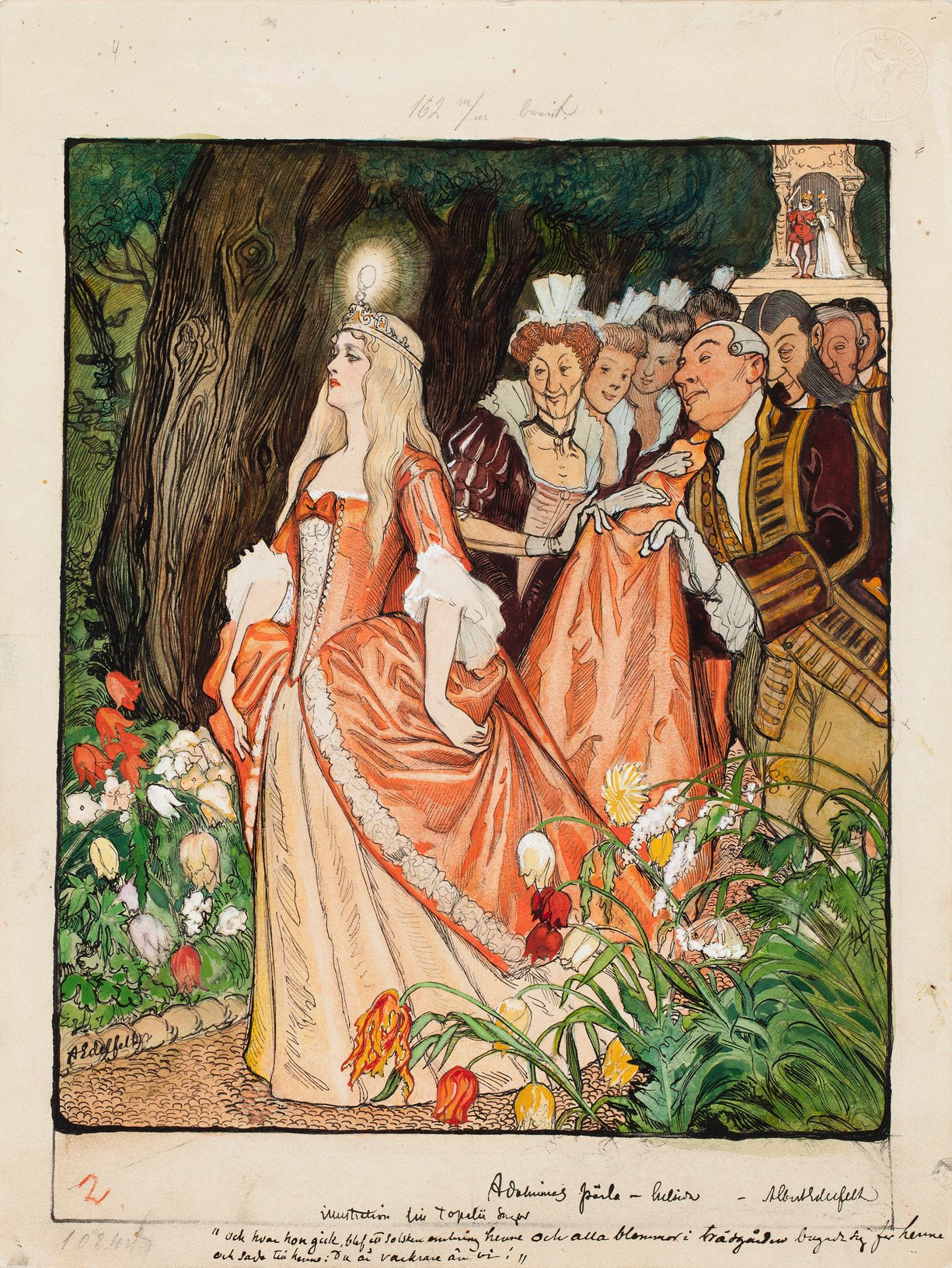
Albert Edelfelt's illustration of Adalmina's Pearl, a fairy tale by Topelius

=== Focus on writing ===
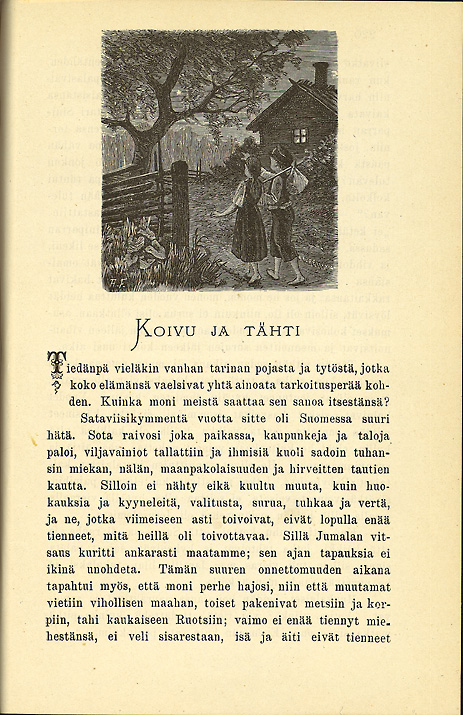
The first page of Finnish-language The Birch and the Star (Koivu ja tähti) from 1893

Quite early in his career he began to distinguish himself as a lyric poet, with the three successive volumes of his Heather Blossoms (1845–54). The earliest of his historical novels was The Duchess of Finland, published in 1850. He was also editor-in-chief of the Helsingfors Tidningar from 1841 to 1860. In 1878, Topelius was allowed to withdraw from his professional duties, but this did not sever his connection with the university; it gave him, however, more leisure for his abundant and various literary enterprises. Of all the multifarious writings of Topelius, in prose and verse, that which has enjoyed the greatest popularity is his The Surgeon's Stories, episodes of historical fiction from the days of Gustavus II Adolphus to those of Gustavus III, treated in the manner of Sir Walter Scott where Topelius like Scott explored the history of the nation through the new genre of historical fiction. The novel made a substantial mark on the Finnish national identity. Topelius also emerged as a Nordic Lutheran writer in the novel exporing religious themes emphasizing good morals and ideals for the emerging Finnish nation and its citizens. The five volumes of this work appeared between 1853 and 1867.

Topelius also attempted to write drama, too, enjoying the most success with his tragedy Regina von Emmeritz (1854). Topelius aimed at the cultivation of a strong Finnish patriotism. He wrote a poem which Jean Sibelius used for a composition with a political statement, Islossningen i Uleå älv.

Together with the composer Friedrich Pacius, he wrote the libretto (in the style of Romantic nationalism) to the first Finnish opera: Kaarle-kuninkaan metsästys (Swedish: Kung Karls jakt, English: King Charles' Hunt). Topelius initially thought of writing a trivial entertainment, but having heard extracts from the opera project at a concert in 1851, he realized that Pacius was writing a grand opera on the theme of salvation, following the early Romantic style of Carl Maria von Weber's Der Freischütz (1821) and Oberon (1826). Topelius wrote the libretto in Swedish (though it was translated later by others), but its subject is emphatically Finnish. He also wrote the libretto for Prinsessan av Cypern, set by Fredrik Pacius and Lars-Erik Larsson.

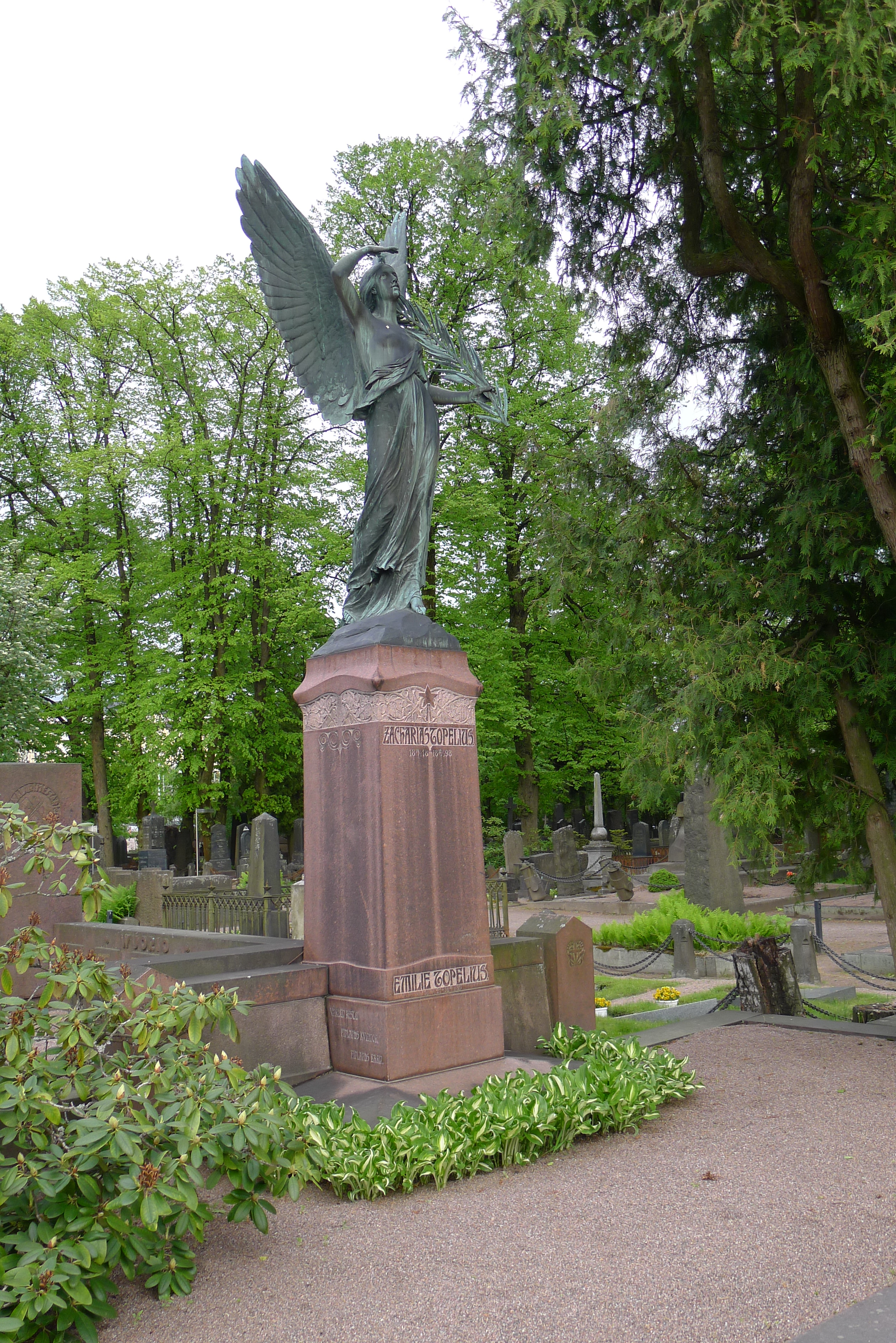
Grave of Topelius at Hietaniemi Cemetery with 1905 sculpture Towards the Light by Walter Runeberg

=== Death ===
Topelius died in his manor house in Koivuniemi, Sipoo, Finland, where he had continued to write. He is buried in the Hietaniemi Cemetery in Helsinki.

== Legacy ==
According to tradition, the modern flag of Finland was based on a design by Topelius in about 1860.

The literary archetypes that Topelius created in The Surgeon's Stories and in Boken om Vårt land (The Book About our Country, 1875) where later adapted by Väinö Linna in his famous work Tuntematon sotilas (The Unknown Soldier, 1954).

There was a small Finnish American village named after Topelius, platted in 1901 in Otter Tail County, Minnesota, US.

== Selected works ==
- The Tomten in Åbo Castle, 1849 (Swedish: Tomtegubben i Åbo slott, Finnish: Turun linnan tonttu-ukko)
- Sov du lilla vide ung, 1869 (Trollsländan)
- Nu så kommer julen, 1857
- Boken om vårt land, 1875 (Maamme-kirja, Book of Our Land)
- Vinterqvällar, 1881 (Talvi-iltain tarinoita)
- Fältskärns berättelser, 1884 (Välskärin kertomukset)
- Läsning för barn, 1881 (Lukemisia lapsille)
- Stjärnornas kungabarn, 1899–1900 (Tähtien turvatit)
- Sampo Lappelill (1860)

== Gallery ==
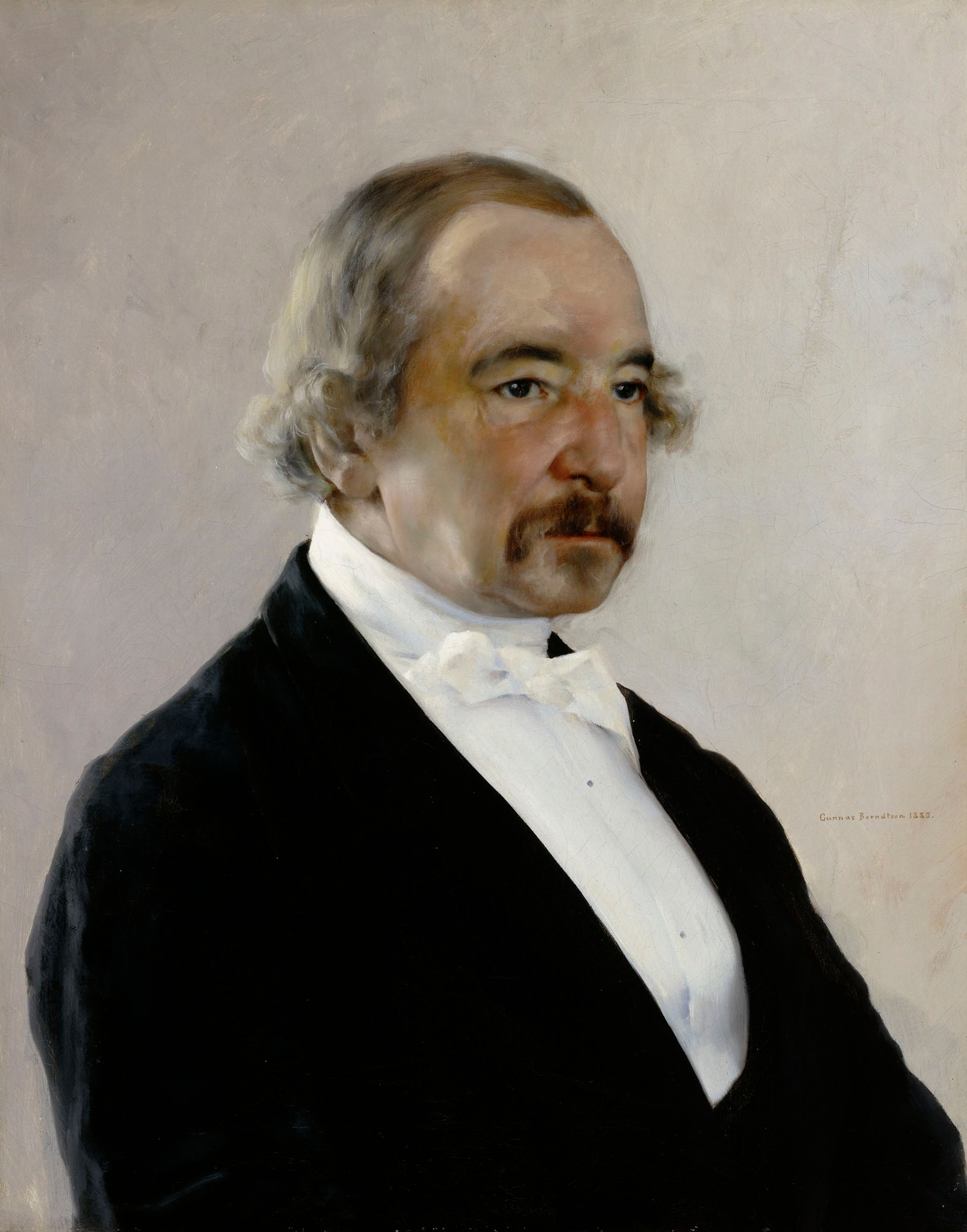
Painted by Gunnar Berndtson in 1880

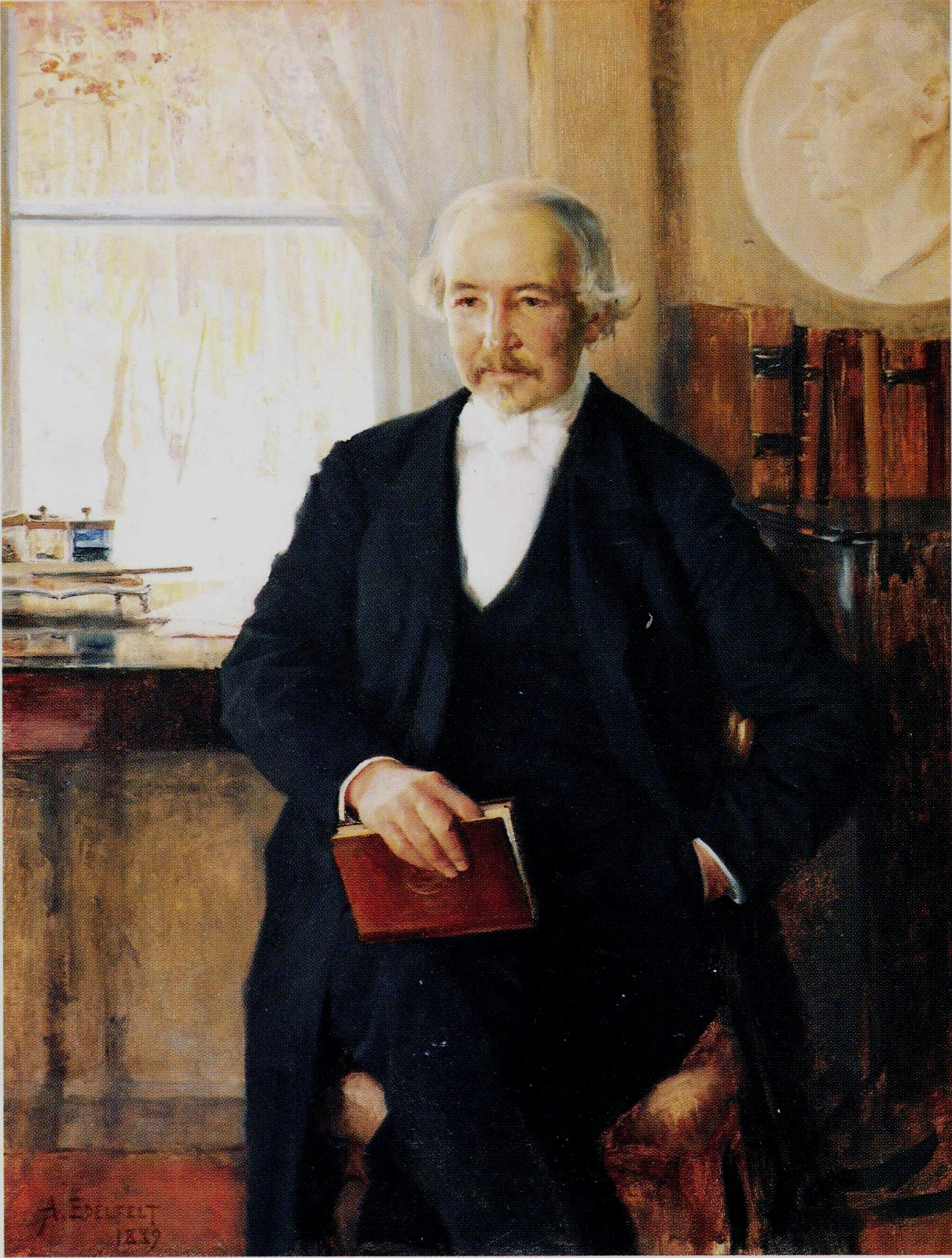
Portrait by Albert Edelfelt, 1889

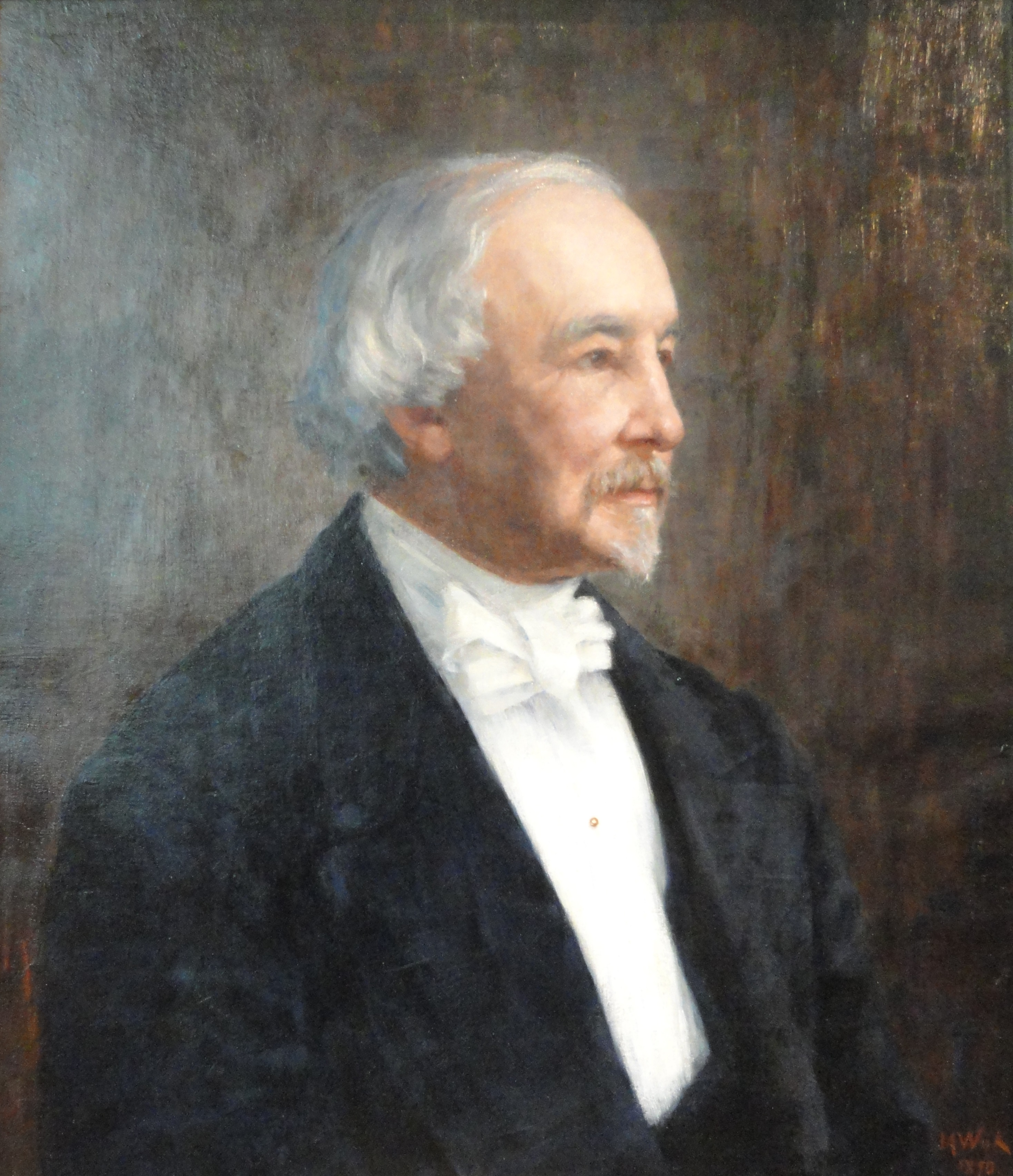
Portrait by Maria Wiik, 1890

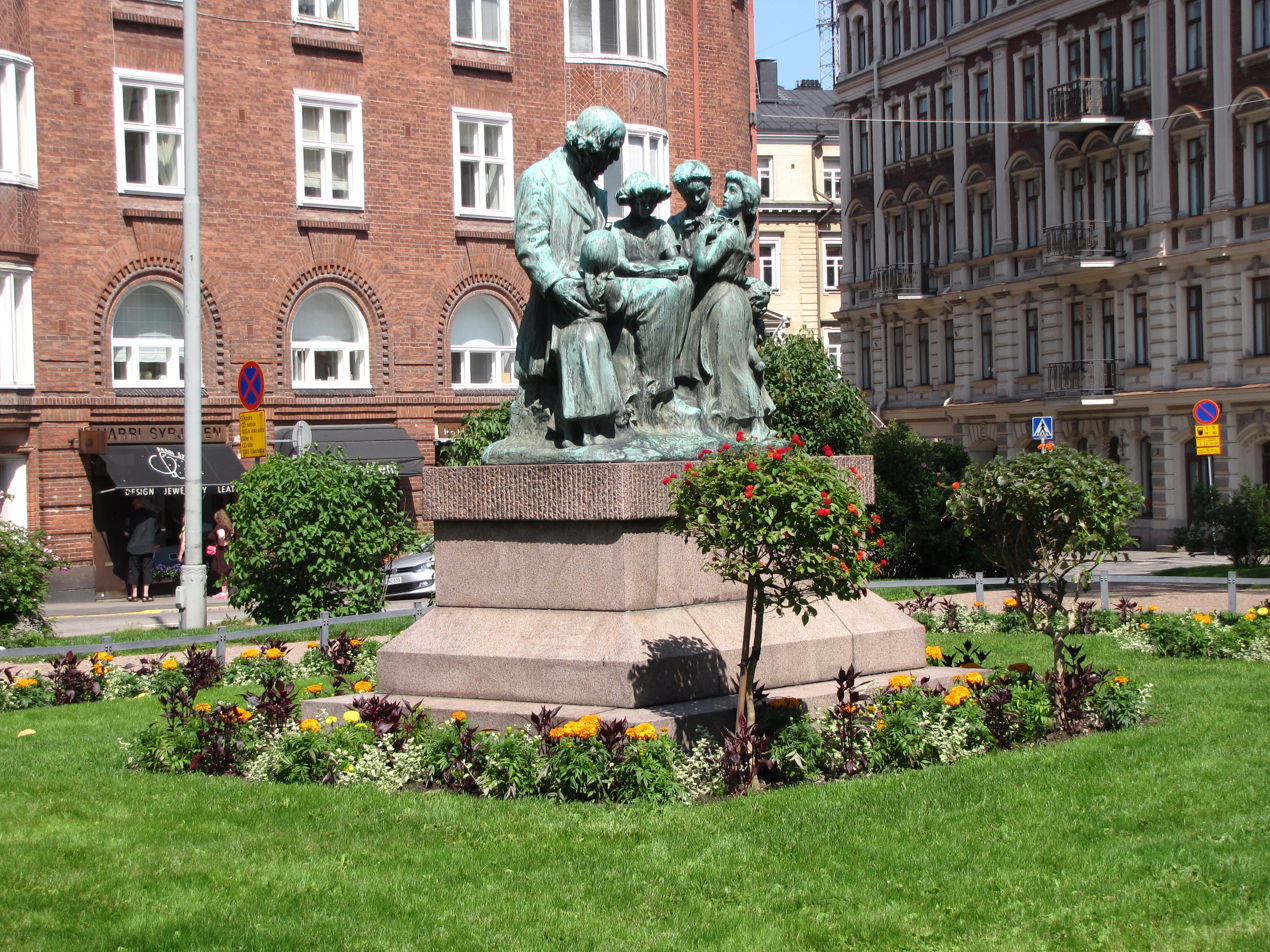
Topelius and Children by Ville Vallgren in Helsinki, 1932

Educational offices
Preceded by Adolf Moberg	Rector of Imperial Alexander University; 1875–1878	Succeeded by Wilhelm Lagus
