= National landscapes of Finland =

Enviromental and cultural features of Finland

National landscapes of Finland were selected by the Finnish Ministry of the Environment in 1992 as a part of the 75th anniversary of the Independence of Finland. The 27 selected landscapes represent the special environmental and cultural features of Finland. They have great symbolic value and significance in cultural or historical terms.

== National landscapes ==
Landscape	Municipalities	Historical province	Modern province	Image	Coordinates
Helsinki seascape	Helsinki	Uusimaa	Uusimaa		60.16605°N 24.955788°E
Tapiola	Espoo	Uusimaa	Uusimaa		60.176449°N 24.808494°E
Snappertuna River, Raseborg Castle and Fagervik Ironworks	Raseborg, Ingå	Uusimaa	Uusimaa		59.997175°N 23.651446°E
Ironworks of Fiskars, Billnäs, Antskog and Åminnefors	Raseborg	Uusimaa	Uusimaa		60.129627°N 23.542236°E
Porvoonjoki Valley and Old Porvoo	Porvoo	Uusimaa	Uusimaa		60.39616°N 25.655737°E
Aura River Valley	Oripää, Pöytyä, Aura, Lieto, Turku	Finland Proper	Southwest Finland		60.46539°N 22.291818°E
Archipelago Sea		Finland Proper, Åland	Southwest Finland, Åland		59.825213°N 21.825578°E
Sund	Sund	Åland	Åland		60.23255°N 20.081044°E
Lake Köyliö	Köyliö	Satakunta	Satakunta		61.120962°N 22.35014°E
Rautavesi Lake	Sastamala	Satakunta	Pirkanmaa		61.351003°N 22.941084°E
Hämeenkyrö	Hämeenkyrö	Satakunta	Pirkanmaa		61.625267°N 23.192482°E
Tammerkoski	Tampere	Satakunta, Tavastia	Pirkanmaa		61.498056°N 23.763889°E
Vanajavesi Valley	Hämeenlinna, Valkeakoski, Akaa, Lempäälä, Hattula, Janakkala	Tavastia	Kanta-Häme, Pirkanmaa		61.160615°N 24.250764°E
Olavinlinna Castle and Pihlajavesi Lake	Savonlinna, Sulkava, Puumala	Savonia	Etelä-Savo		61.863939°N 28.901069°E
Punkaharju Ridge	Punkaharju	Savonia	Etelä-Savo		61.769916°N 29.358559°E
Heinävesi Route		Savonia	Etelä-Savo		62.514343°N 28.641787°E
Väisälänmäki Village	Lapinlahti	Savonia	Pohjois-Savo		63.342339°N 27.23467°E
Imatrankoski	Imatra	Karelia	South Karelia		61.169409°N 28.773837°E
Koli	Lieksa	Karelia	North Karelia		63.093457°N 29.81123°E
Villages of North Karelian hillside		Karelia	North Karelia		62.376268°N 30.759538°E
Kyrönjoki Valley and agricultural area of Southern Ostrobothnia		Ostrobothnia	Southern Ostrobothnia		62.801968°N 22.818947°E
Kvarken	Korsnäs, Malax, Korsholm, Vaasa, Vörå	Ostrobothnia	Ostrobothnia		63.409615°N 20.948981°E
Hailuoto Island	Hailuoto	Ostrobothnia	Northern Ostrobothnia		65.033333°N 24.7°E
Oulankajoki River	Salla, Kuusamo	Ostrobothnia	Lapland		66.297227°N 29.599733°E
Aavasaksa and Torne Valley	Tornio, Ylitornio, Pello, Kolari, Muonio, Enontekiö	Ostrobothnia, Lapland	Lapland		66.4°N 23.733333°E
Pallastunturi	Muonio, Enontekiö	Lapland	Lapland		68.072439°N 24.060059°E
Utsjoki Valley	Utsjoki	Lapland	Lapland		69.903332°N 27.022591°E
