= Names of Finland =

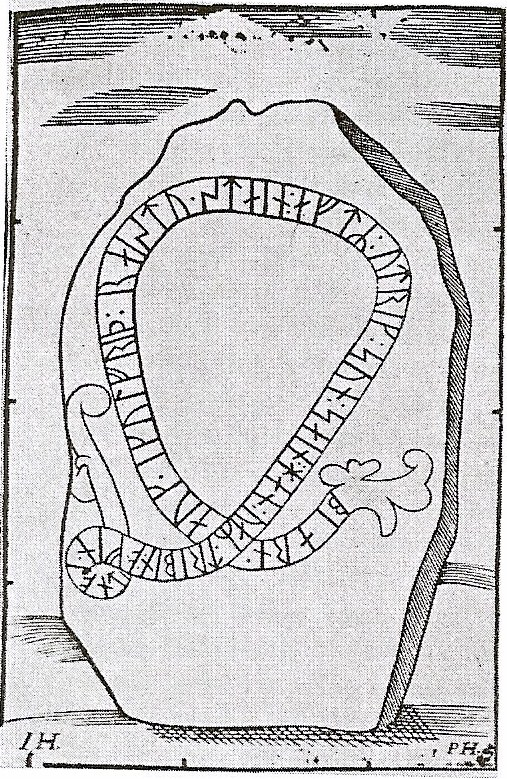
The lost runestone U 582 from Söderby-Karl in Uppland, in a 17th-century drawing by Johan Hadorph. Its inscription commemorates a man who "was killed in Finland" (á Finnlandi), one of two known runic attestations of the name.

The country of Finland is known by two unrelated names: Finnish: Suomi, used in Finnish and, in corresponding forms, in the other Finnic languages; and Finland, a name of Old Norse origin used in Swedish and, in various forms, in most other languages. The origin of both is uncertain, and neither has an explanation that is generally accepted.

Explanations deriving Suomi from the Finnish words suo ('mire') or suomu ('scale') are of long standing but are rejected in modern scholarship on both semantic and morphological grounds. Two accounts dominate current discussion: one derives Suomi through a chain of loans between Proto-Finnic, Proto-Sámi and the Baltic languages from a Baltic word for 'land', linking it to the province name Häme and to the Sámi endonym sápmi; the other treats Suomi and sápmi as reflexes of a common Finno-Samic self-designation of unclear origin. The Old Norse element finnr behind Finland, by contrast, appears to have been a Scandinavian term for northern neighbours in general, denoting the Sámi in Norwegian usage and the inhabitants of south-western Finland in Swedish usage.

Both names originally referred only to the coastal region around Turku (Swedish: Åbo), later known as Finland Proper. From 1308 Österland ('the Eastern Land'), originally the territories east of Finland Proper, was the official designation of the eastern part of the Swedish realm; from 1464, and especially after 1500, Finland displaced it, and Österlandet appeared in official documents for the last time in 1525. The style grand duke of Finland, adopted by John III of Sweden in 1581, remained a heraldic element of the royal titulature until 1809, when the Grand Duchy of Finland became the official designation of autonomous Finland within the Russian Empire.

== Etymology ==
=== Suomi ===
Suomi is recorded as a personal name as early as 811 and as a place name in forms such as Somewesi (1323); the derivative suomalainen ('Finn') appears as the personal name Somalayni in 1340. Corresponding forms occur across the Finnic languages: Ingrian sōmi, Votic sōmi, Estonian Soome and Livonian sūom, while the Karelian, Ludic and North Sámi forms are borrowings from Finnish. Latvian sāms ('Finn') has been derived from Finnic *sōme.

The name is demonstrably old. It is an e-stem, and such stems are, with few exceptions, at least 1,500 years old; the derivative suomalainen also lacks the stem alternation found in younger names such as Lappi–lappalainen. Whether it was originally a place name or an ethnonym is unclear; before its reference widened, it denoted the region around Turku now called Finland Proper.

Older explanations connected the name with phonetically similar Finnish words: suo ('mire'), suomu ('scale', taken to allude to totemism or to prehistoric fish-skin clothing), and suoda ('to grant', hence "the land granted by God"). These are unsuitable as starting points for suomi and suomalainen, partly on grounds of word formation and partly on semantic grounds. The derivation from suo fails semantically because Finland Proper has fewer mires than the regions surrounding it, and morphologically because the remainder of the word cannot be analysed as any suitable derivational suffix.

In 1993 Jorma Koivulehto proposed that Suomi had reached Finnish through a chain of borrowings, reviving in a new form the old idea that suomi and saame are ultimately the same word: Baltic *žemē ('land') was borrowed into early Proto-Finnic as *šämä, the source of Finnish Häme; this passed into Proto-Sámi as *sǡmǡ, the source of Sámi sabme; it was borrowed back into Baltic as *sāmas; and from there into Finnic as *sōme. Repeated borrowing has to be assumed in order to account for the irregular sound correspondences between Suomi, Häme and Sámi sabme.

In 1998 Petri Kallio instead derived Suomi independently of Häme and Sámi, from an Indo-European or pre-Baltic word for 'land' (*ǵʰom-, *gʰom-yā), or alternatively from Baltic *stō-mē, whose descendants in the modern Baltic languages mean only 'body, build' but which belongs to the same word family as German Stamm ('tribe'). Kallio's etymology was for a time the most widely accepted, but he has since abandoned it himself. It presupposes contacts between the Uralic and Proto-Indo-European proto-languages, which are now placed in the Uralic homeland far to the east rather than on the shores of the Baltic, making it difficult to explain how such a name could have travelled west and attached itself to one particular province.

It has more recently been proposed that suomi and Sámi sápmi both go back to a word *sämä of the Finno-Samic (early Proto-Finnic) proto-language, whose own origin is unclear, and that Häme is a loan from the later Proto-Sámi form of that word. Advances in the study of Uralic historical phonology underlie the proposal: if Suomi is old enough to go back to early Proto-Finnic, its form at that stage would have been *sämi, which may in turn derive from an earlier *sämä. On this account the three names still belong together, but in a different way than had been assumed, and the motivation behind the original word remains unknown. None of the proposed explanations can be regarded as certain, but neither can any of them be ruled out.

=== Finland ===
The Old Norse element finnr denoted different peoples in different Scandinavian languages: in Norwegian usage it traditionally referred to the Sámi and to Lapland, whereas in Swedish usage it referred to the inhabitants of Finland Proper. A parallel has been drawn with the Germanic word behind Welsh, Walloon and Vlach, which in different Germanic languages came to designate quite different neighbouring peoples: it meant, roughly, 'those who are not us', and its various forms attached themselves to different regions and populations. The same is likely to hold for finnr and Finland.

Old village names containing the element finn- — Finne, Finby, Finböle — occur in Denmark and southern Sweden and have sometimes been taken as evidence that Finns once lived that far west. Place-name research does not support this, since Finnish-speaking settlement would be expected to have left other kinds of place names as well. The Scandinavian languages spread northwards comparatively late — some 1,500 years ago they were still spoken in Denmark and southern Sweden — and as they advanced in successive waves along the Norwegian coast and up through Sweden, the old name for the earlier inhabitants was transferred to each new set of neighbours: to the Sámi in the case of the Norwegians, and to the Finns in the case of the Swedes. As Swedish rule expanded eastward at the end of the Middle Ages, the referents of Suomi and Finland widened in step with one another.

== Historical usage ==
=== Finlandia and Österland ===
Viking Age runestones record Scandinavians who died in the east; one, in Gästrikland and dated to 1030–1050, commemorates a viking named Egil who died in Tavastland. Two inscriptions name Finland itself. U 582, now lost, stood at Söderby-Karl church in Uppland and was raised by Bjǫrn and Ígulfríðr in memory of their son Ótryggr, who "was killed in Finland" (Hann vaʀ drepinn a Finnlandi). G 319, a grave slab at Rute church on Gotland, was made for Auðvaldr, "who died in Finland" (a Finnlandi do). That so few runestones commemorate deaths in Finland may indicate that expeditions there were successful and casualties few, or simply that they were raised at a time when runestones were already going out of fashion.

Finlandia, the Latin name for Finland, began to appear in the titles of the bishops of Åbo from 1221 and denoted the south-western provinces around Åbo (Turku). As the lands east of Åbo were incorporated into Sweden, the official designation Österlanden, later Österlandet ('the Eastern Land'), was introduced in 1308 and became established particularly after the 1330s, covering the territories east of what was then called Finland. From 1464, and especially after 1500, Finland came to be used for the whole area; Österlandet appeared in official documents for the last time in 1525, in a charter granted by Gustav Vasa.

The shift was more than terminological. As Finland replaced Österlandet in the later 15th century, the older province-based designations for the inhabitants — nylänningar, tavaster, karelare, savolaxare and bottningar — could be replaced by finnar ('Finns'), a word that at the time carried no linguistic meaning and covered the Swedish-speaking and Finnish-speaking populations alike.

=== Duchy and Grand Duchy ===
The lion arms, created together with the grand-ducal style in the late 16th century, remain Finland's coat of arms.

Finlandia also appeared in secular Swedish offices. The highest was dux Finlandiae, duke of Finland, attested from the end of the 13th century and normally held by a member of the royal house who did not live in Finland at all. Next in rank was the praefectus or advocatus Finlandiae, the governor or bailiff of Finland and the highest Swedish office-holder resident in the country, and his military counterpart the capitaneus terrae Finlandensis, commander of Finland. Bengt Birgersson, son of Birger Jarl, was duke of Finland in 1284–1291, as was Valdemar Magnusson, son of Magnus Ladulås, in 1302–1317. The extent of this duchy is unknown, but Finland at that time meant Finland Proper.

In 1518 Johannes Magnus used the heightened form Magnus Ducatus Finlandiae, 'Grand Duchy of Finland', in a letter to the Polish historian Maciej Miechowita; he was among the first to express in writing the view that Finland was something more than a Swedish region. Gustav Vasa in turn repeated the medieval idea that Finland was a duchy, Ducatus Finlandiae, in his letters abroad, among them a letter to the pope in 1523. In 1556 Gustav Vasa granted his son Johan the counties of Åbo and Kumogård together with Åland as a hereditary fief, to which Raseborg county was added in 1557; the duchy was taken from him again in 1563, and his own son Johan bore the ducal title in 1594–1606.

To assert himself against the tsar and grand prince of Moscow, Johan, by then King John III, assumed the title grand duke of Finland in 1581, and it was borne by all his successors until 1809; Finland's lion arms were created at the same time. The grand duchy received no defined borders during the Swedish period. Gustavus Adolphus bore the title as heir to the throne, as did Karl Gustav, Grand Duke of Finland, the younger son of Gustav IV Adolf, in 1802–1805.

From 1809 Grand Duchy of Finland became the official designation of autonomous Finland within the Russian Empire. The grand duchy thereby changed from a purely heraldic concept in the royal titulature into one denoting a concrete administrative and political entity. It remained the country's official name until 1917 and was formally abolished in 1919.

=== Historical cartographic delimitation ===
Although the grand-ducal title was instituted in 1581, it took almost a century before a delimited Grand Duchy of Finland appeared in cartographic material. It first occurs on a map made in 1662 by the Dutch cartographer Joan Blaeu, but the image is internally contradictory: the colouring suggests a boundary running from the Neva to the Kalix River, while the accompanying series of coats of arms omits both Kexholm county and Åland. The Swedish central government's own appointments to office were likewise mutually inconsistent during the 17th century as to which areas were counted as belonging to the Grand Duchy.

On Swedish national maps a delimited Grand Duchy of Finland was entirely absent until the 1790s. The Land Survey's national map of 1747 instead labels "Finland" as one of the realm's main divisions, on a par with the unclassified Norrland.

=== In Relation to Ostrobothnia, Åland, and Karelia ===
The status of Ostrobothnia within the concept of Finland was long unclear. The province belonged to the Diocese of Åbo, but its clergy held favourable privileges of their own dating from the reign of Charles X Gustav, and its judiciary fell under the Åbo Court of Appeal, together with the rest of Finland, until a separate court was established at Vasa in 1776. The watershed of Suomenselkä was regarded as a natural boundary with both Russia and Savolax. Gustavus Adolphus himself distinguished between "here" in Finland and "there" in Ostrobothnia, and in 1695 the naturalist Olof Rudbeck the Younger called Vasa the capital of Ostrobothnia and Åbo the capital of Finland. When the occupying Russian forces issued a proclamation in 1716 during the Greater Wrath, it was addressed to the inhabitants of "the principality of Finland, and the Ostrobothnian province" as two distinct entities.

During the 18th century a concept of Finland that included Ostrobothnia gained increasing currency, though the combined name "Finland and Ostrobothnia" was often retained to make clear that the province was included. When Gustaf Fredrik von Rosen was appointed governor-general "over the Grand Duchy of Finland with Ostrobothnia and Åland" in 1747, the elaborate phrasing reflected the same need for clarity.

The status of Åland was likewise disputed. People who moved there from Finland Proper were called "Finns" by the islanders regardless of what language they spoke, and according to the geographer Eric Tuneld (1741), Åland lay as an island "between Uppland and Finland" rather than as part of the latter. When the bank commissioner Fredrik Silfverstolpe travelled through Eckerö in 1757, he was asked whether he came "from the east or from the west" — according to him, the islanders used neither the concept of Finland nor of Sweden for their own affiliation. The question of Åland's historical state allegiance resurfaced during the Åland crisis of 1917–1921, when Finnish and Swedish historians disputed the matter without either side being able to settle it by historical argument.

Karelia — the counties of Viborg and Kexholm — occupied a similarly uncertain position. The 1634 Instrument of Government states that the Åbo Court of Appeal covered the Grand Duchy of Finland and "both Karelias", an additive formulation implying that neither Vyborg nor Kexholm county formally belonged to the Grand Duchy of Finland. Torbjörn Eng has summarised the situation as a "considerable uncertainty regarding the relationship of Karelia, Åland and Ostrobothnia to the Grand Duchy".

The cartographic record shows the same fluctuation as for Ostrobothnia and Åland: on Joan Blaeu's 1662 map, Kexholm county is included within the coloured area but absent from the accompanying series of coats of arms; on Frederick de Wit's map of around 1688, Ostrobothnia, Åland and Kexholm county are all included; and on Guillaume Sanson's map of 1692, Kexholm county is included while Åland is left out.

Heraldically, however, Karelia held a more clearly equal status: in the hierarchy of Swedish provincial arms, Karelia was consistently ranked, like Northern and Southern Finland, as a duchy, whereas Åland, Nyland, Savolax and Ostrobothnia were always counties — a lower rank. In the royal titulature, moreover, Karelia was named as its own, coordinate element rather than as part of "Finland".

As a summarising illustration, Per Brahe the Younger was appointed governor-general of Finland in 1637, with "Åland and both Karelias" (i.e. the counties of Viborg and Kexholm) explicitly included in his jurisdiction; Ostrobothnia was not yet part of it. A separate order in 1641 detached Kexholm county and transferred it to the governor-generalship of Ingria. When Brahe was appointed to the office a second time in 1648, it instead covered "Finland together with Åland and Ostrobothnia". When the office was given to Herman Fleming on an acting basis in 1655, it was styled "over ... Finland with Viborg county and Åland".

=== "Sweden-Finland" and the "half of the realm" ===
The retrospective construction Sweden-Finland for the joint realm before 1809 is not a contemporary usage. It entered Finnish historiography only in the 1920s, when historians sought to make the eastern part of the realm more visible and to underline Finland's distinct position within it. The Uppslagsverket Finland encyclopaedia advises against using "Sweden-Finland" for the pre-1809 realm, calling it an "occasionally used (improper) designation": it implies, at least by suggestion, a union of two realms comparable to Poland-Lithuania (1569–1795), whereas Finland was never separated from the kingdom in constitutional terms by particular laws or its own representative bodies, and indeed became progressively more integrated during the 17th century.

The designation "half of the realm" (Swedish: rikshalva) has likewise been criticised as misleading, since Finland never constituted half of the realm by area, population or economy — though John III of Sweden, in a politically difficult situation, himself once claimed that Finland was half of his realm. "The eastern" or "the Finnish part of the realm" has been proposed as a more accurate term, paired with "the western" or "Swedish part of the realm" on the far side of the Gulf of Bothnia.

== See also ==
- Finn (ethnonym)
- Finland Proper (historical province)
- Österland
- Grand Duchy of Finland
- List of country-name etymologies

== Bibliography ==
- Tarkiainen, Kari (2008). Sveriges Österland: Från forntiden till Gustav Vasa. Skrifter utgivna av Svenska litteratursällskapet i Finland (in Swedish). Vol. 702:1 (2nd revised ed.). Helsinki/Stockholm: Svenska litteratursällskapet i Finland / Bokförlaget Atlantis. ISBN 978-951-583-155-2.
- Villstrand, Nils Erik (2009). Riksdelen: Stormakt och rikssprängning 1560–1812. Skrifter utgivna av Svenska litteratursällskapet i Finland (in Swedish). Vol. 702:2. Helsinki/Stockholm: Svenska litteratursällskapet i Finland / Bokförlaget Atlantis. ISBN 978-951-583-184-2.
- Eng, Torbjörn (2001). Det svenska väldet: Ett konglomerat av uttrycksformer och begrepp från Vasa till Bernadotte. Studia Historica Upsaliensia (in Swedish). Vol. 201. Uppsala: Uppsala universitet.
- Merovuo, Jenni (2026). "A Grand Duchy without a Grand Duke: Conceptualizing Finland in Eighteenth-Century Sweden". In Liikanen, Ilkka; Marjanen, Jani (eds.). The Grand Duchy of Finland: From Princely Power to National Statehood. Studia Fennica Historica. Vol. 30. Helsinki: Finnish Literature Society (SKS). ISBN 978-952-427-012-0.
