= Duke of Finland =

Medieval title in Sweden and Finland

Duke of Finland (Swedish: hertig av Finland; Finnish: Suomen herttua) was an occasional title granted between the 13th and 16th centuries, usually as an appanage to a relative of the King of Sweden, and associated with areas in today's Finland.

Starting with John III in the 1580s, Swedish monarchs adopted the style of Grand Duke of Finland.

== Background ==
=== Notion of Finland ===
In the medieval period, the term "Finland" initially referred only to the area of Finland Proper, the region around Åbo (today's Turku in Finnish). It was only gradually extended to cover the whole of present-day Finland, including Swedish Karelia. In the 14th and 15th century, this wider area was instead usually called Österland or Österlanden ("the Eastern Land(s)"), a term first attested in Swedish sources in connection with a 1308 settlement at Örebro.

=== Ducal title in Sweden ===
Historians trace the origin of the ducal title in Sweden to the mid-13th century, when it effectively replaced the older title of jarl following the death of Birger Jarl in 1266. Birger Jarl's son Magnus was the first to bear the new title, using it from 1255 as "Sweden's junior duke" (Latin: iunior dux sweorum) and, after his father's death, as "Duke of Sweden by the grace of God" (Dei gratia dux sveorum), until his own coronation as king in 1275. Throughout the medieval period, the title's holders were granted a duchy that more often denoted a collection of estates, revenues, and privileges than a fixed territory.

In the late 15th century, historian Ericus Olai referred to Bishop Kol of Linköping (died about 1196) as Duke of Finland (Colo episcopus Lincopensis et dux Finlandie). The title dux is generally considered inappropriate for a bishop, since it was normally applied to secular magnates.

Olai's description may nonetheless reflect a genuine connection between the Bishopric of Linköping and the eastern Baltic. Philip Line points to mid-13th-century evidence that the Bishop of Linköping held authority over Finland's bishop, tied to well-documented Gotlandic trading contacts in Finland. Per Olof Sjöstrand has similarly linked the title to the bishopric's wider role in the eastern Baltic: the Bishop of Linköping accompanied the Swedish ledung on its unsuccessful Estonian expedition in 1220, and in 1229 the Pope used him to assist the Bishop of Finland in organising the diocese. Birger Jarl, who led the second crusade to Finland, was likewise closely associated with the Bishop of Linköping through family ties, while Bengt Birgersson, the first known Duke of Finland, was himself later elected Bishop of Linköping.

== Middle Ages ==
=== Duke Bengt Birgersson ===
Bengt's seal from 1288.

Bengt Birgersson (1254–1291), the youngest son of Birger Jarl, was granted the title of Duke of Finland (dux Finlandiae) in 1284 by his brother, King Magnus Ladulås. His elevation coincided with the crown consolidating its hold on the territories east of the Gulf of Bothnia. Construction began around this time on Åbo Castle and Tavastehus Castle (in today's Finland).

The duchy's exact extent is unknown. There is also no evidence that Bengt ever visited Finland or exercised independent rule there. Whether the title was purely honorary is disputed. Bengt was elected as the bishop of Linköping in 1286, and in his testament the following year, he requested that debts incurred "for the duchy's sake" be paid from its revenues. This has been read either as evidence of genuine ducal income, or, alternatively, as referring to an older, separate institution unrelated to Finland, in which case the title would have carried little practical substance. He probably held the title until his death in 1291, though this is not explicitly confirmed by the sources.

=== Duke Valdemar ===
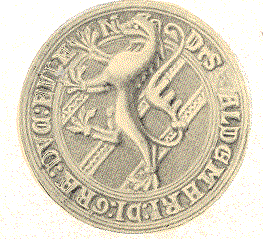
Valdemar's seal from 1307, with the Bjälbo lion.

Valdemar (d. 1318), the youngest son of King Magnus Ladulås, was granted the Duchy of Finland as an appanage at the coronation of his elder brother King Birger in 1302. He thereafter also styled himself Duke of Sweden, like his brother Erik, though he continued to use an earlier seal naming him Duke of Finland.

Following a settlement at Örebro in 1308, the castles of Åbo, Tavastehus, and (according to one account) Viborg, together with the rest of Finland and the eastern territories (Österland), were administered jointly by Valdemar and his brother Erik. (Note: Sources differ on whether Viborg was included in 1308: Gallén (1964) states that all three castles were ceded and that King Birger recovered only Viborg at a further settlement in 1310, while Suvanto (2000) states that Viborg was withheld from the outset.) At a further settlement in Helsingborg in 1310, Birger recovered only parts of northern and eastern Sweden. An old royal genealogy records that Valdemar alone retained Finland Proper, Tavastia, Nyland, and Åland.

The two brothers' duchies became self-governing at this point, on an equal footing with the king's own share of the realm, an arrangement that lasted until 1317. In 1315, Valdemar's holdings were reorganised to also include Åbo and Tavastehus castles and their fiefs outright, alongside Stockholm, part of Uppland, and Öland, and he established his ducal court at Borgholm Castle in Öland. The duchy of Finland lapsed when Valdemar was seized and imprisoned at the Nyköping Banquet in 1317, dying the following year.

=== Duke Bengt Algotsson ===
Bengt Algotsson (d. 1360), unlike the other holders of the title, was a nobleman outside the royal family. A favourite of King Magnus Eriksson, he was made duke of Finland and Halland. The surviving annals date this to 1353, though the dating has been questioned as too early, since the annals themselves are 15th-century compilations. He himself used the Latin title österlandiarum et vtriusque Hallandie dux ("duke of Österland and both Hallands") in 1355. Even the character of Bengt's own duchy is not fully understood.

Following a rebellion against Magnus, a settlement at Jönköping in 1357 forced Magnus to cede all of Österland — that is, the whole diocese of Åbo — to his son Erik, who administered it, including Finland, until his own death in 1359. Bengt was thereby deposed and forced into exile.

No new duke of Finland was appointed for about two centuries. Nevertheless, in a 1523 letter to the Pope, King Gustav Vasa still referred to "the whole duchy of Finland" (Latin: totum Ducatum Finlandie), even though no one had held the ducal title for a long time.

== Early modern period ==
=== Duke John the Elder: from duchy to grand duchy ===
Borders of John's duchy on the contemporary map of Finland

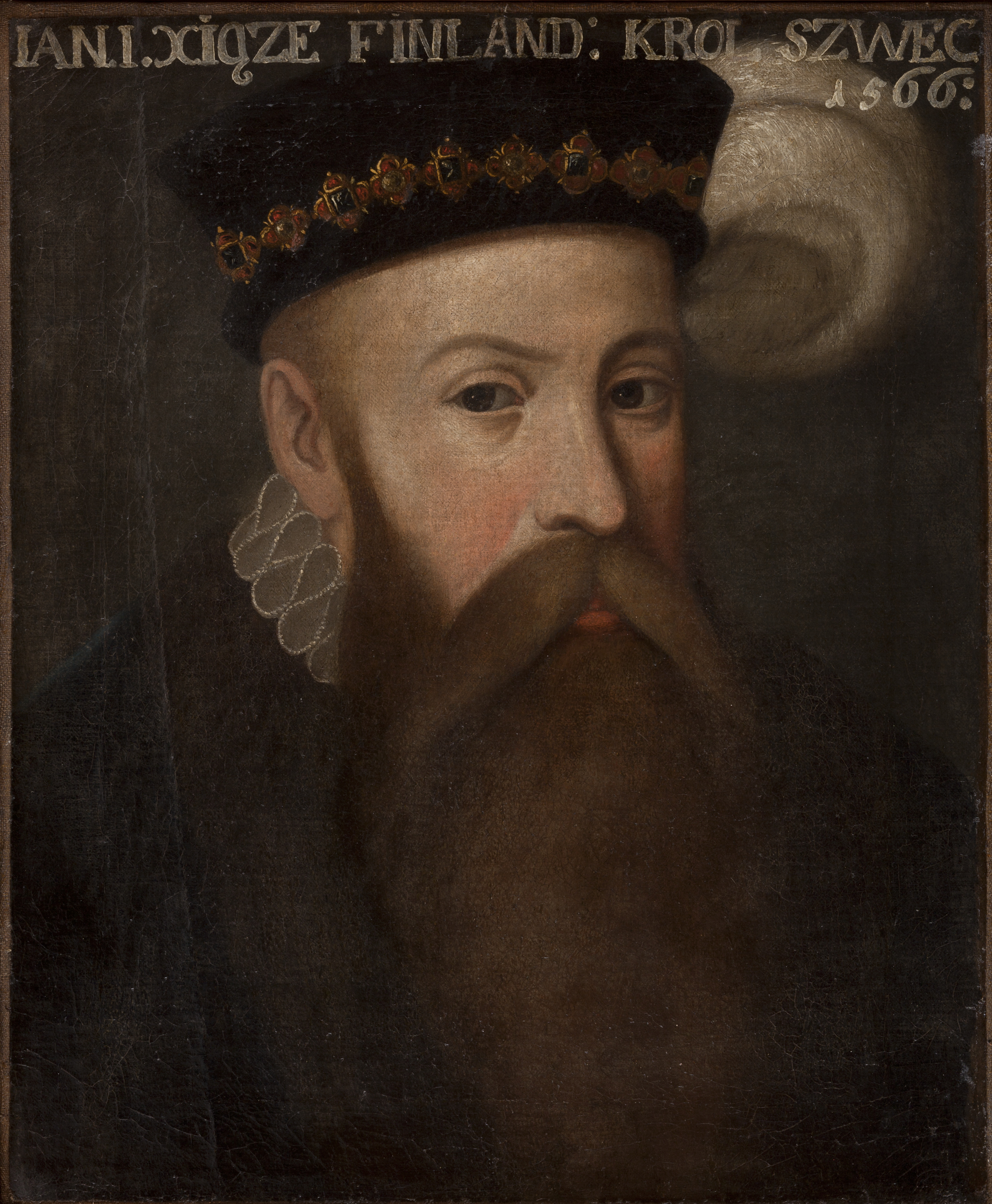
Duke John the Elder (later King John III)

Unlike the medieval dukes, whose duchies had rarely corresponded to a fixed territory, the early modern dukes of Finland were granted specific administrative fiefs (slottslän) centred on named castles. In 1556, King Gustav Vasa gave the Duchy of Finland to his second son, Prince John (1537–1592). The duchy initially included Finland Proper together with Åland, and Satakunda; it was extended the following year, in 1557, to include Raseborg together with Western Nyland. From 1556 to 1560, John also held supreme civil and military authority ("styresman") over all of Finland, beyond the hereditary fief itself.

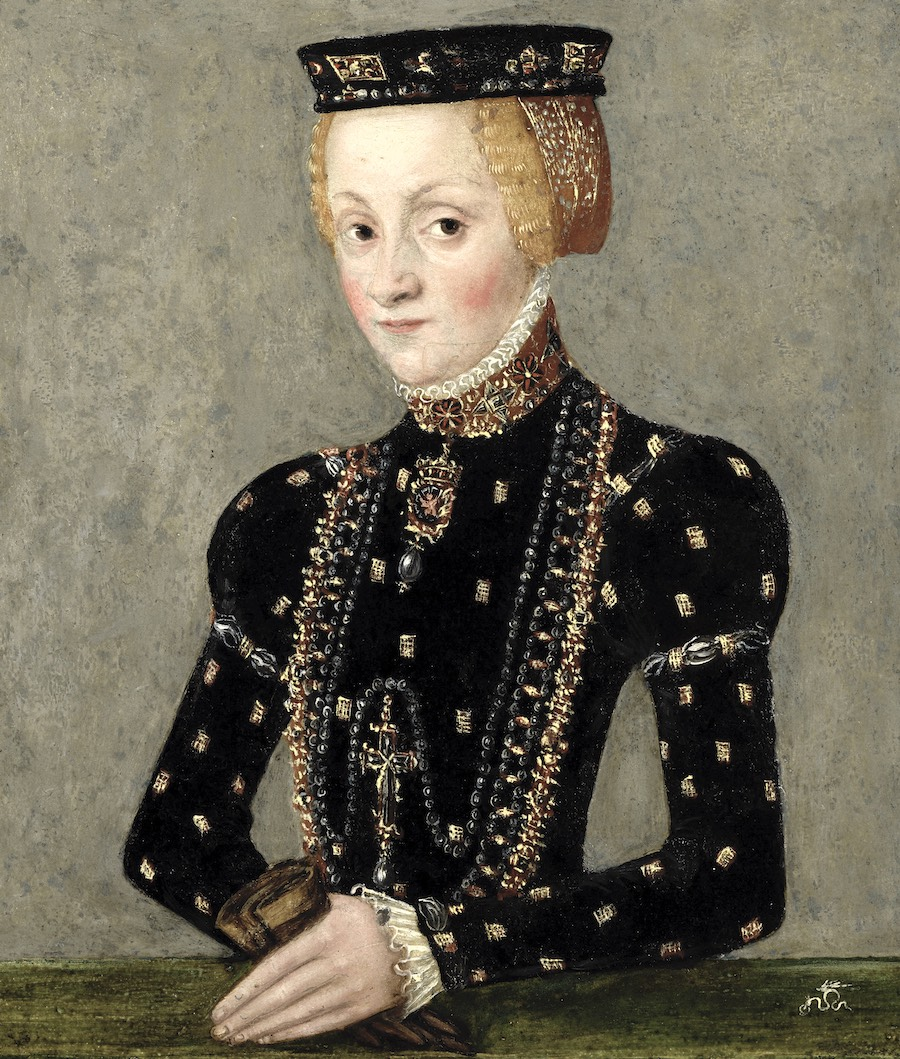
With his wife Catherine Jagellonica, John held his court in Åbo (Turku).

John married Catherine Jagellonica in Vilnius in 1562, without his brother's, king Eric XIV's, consent. Combined with commitments John had made to her brother, King Sigismund II Augustus of Poland, this led to a breach with King Eric XIV, who besieged Åbo Castle and had the ducal couple imprisoned in 1563, shortly after their arrival there.

John was released in 1567 and deposed Eric in turn in 1568, ascending the throne as King John III. He reigned until his death in 1592.

In 1581–1582, King John III assumed the subsidiary title of storfurste ("Grand Duke") of Finland and Karelia. In English this title is rendered Grand Duke of Finland. It was used by his successors until it lapsed from the royal titulature in 1720 but was briefly revived in 1802–1805 for a Swedish prince. It ceased to apply to the Swedish crown when Finland was ceded to Russia in 1809 and became an autonomous Grand Duchy of Finland within the Russian Empire until 1917.

=== John the Younger ===
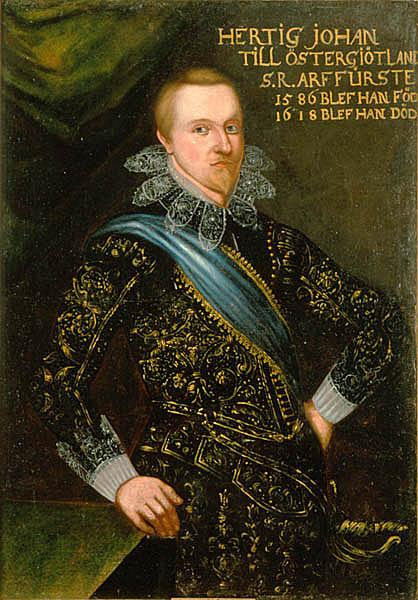
John, Duke of Finland 1590–1606.

King John III granted his old Duchy and its title in 1590 to John the Younger (1589–1618), his infant son from his second marriage. That same year he was also nominally granted Bråborg Castle and its fief in Östergötland, but he never took possession of either grant. Some sources instead date the start of his ducal tenure in Finland to 1594.

As he approached adulthood, he was made Duke of Östergötland in 1600. After renouncing his claims to the Swedish throne in 1604, he took possession of this new duchy in 1606, with extensive powers granted by his uncle, King Charles IX.

== Duchess of Finland ==
Despite the existence of the title Duke of Finland, there is no evidence that the wives of its holders were themselves titled Duchess of Finland. The informal designation "Duchess of Finland" was in popular use for two unrelated women with no connection to any actual duke: Eva Merthen and Pauline Dammert (1835–1871). Merthen was a mayor's daughter from Åbo known as the mistress of the Scottish-Russian general James Keith (whose story was fictionalized by Zacharias Topelius). Dammert was admired for her beauty and courted by Charles XV of Sweden.

Nor do biographical sources on Duke John's wife, Catherine Jagellonica, style her Duchess of Finland. A contemporary rhymed chronicle by Duke Charles instead calls her furstinna ("princely consort"): "Hans [Johans] furstinna dygdefull o from, ändock hennes lära var kommen av Rom" ("His [John's] princely consort, virtuous and pious, though her faith had come from Rome"). Modern biographical dictionaries instead describe her descriptively, as part of "the ducal couple" or as "mistress" of Åbo Castle.

== List of dukes of Finland ==
This list includes Swedish lords of Finland by other titles.

Title held (years)	Name	Notes
1284-1291?	Bengt Birgersson	appointed, also Bishop of Linköping, probably died with title
1302-1318	Valdemar	appointed, also Duke of Uppland & Öland from 1310, died with titles
1353?-1357	Bengt Algotsson	appointed (year debated), deposed, also Duke of Halland until 1356, died c.1360
1556-1563	John	appointed, deposed, became King of Sweden 1569, died 1592
1589-1606	John	from birth, deposed, continued as Duke of Östergötland, died with that title 1618

== See also ==
- Grand Duchy of Finland
- Duchies in Sweden

== Bibliography ==
- Eng, Torbjörn (2001). Det svenska väldet: ett konglomerat av uttrycksformer och begrepp från Vasa till Bernadotte (PhD thesis). Acta Universitatis Upsaliensis. ISBN 91-554-5179-9.
- Gallén, Jarl (1964). "Finland och Österland". Historisk Tidskrift för Finland (4): 121–140 – via Nationalbibliotekets digitala samlingar.
- Line, Philip (2007). Kingship and State Formation in Sweden, 1130–1290. Brill.
- Pirinen, Kauko (1953). "Magnus ducatus Finlandiae". Historiallinen Aikakauskirja. 51 (2): 107–114.
- Sjöstrand, Per Olof (1994). "Den svenska tidigmedeltida statsbildningsprocessen och den östra rikshalvan". Historisk Tidskrift för Finland (in Swedish). 79: 530–573.
- Tarkiainen, Kari (2008). Sveriges Österland: från forntiden till Gustav Vasa. Finlands svenska historia. Vol. 1. Svenska litteratursällskapet i Finland.
- Villstrand, Nils Erik (2009). Riksdelen: Stormakt och rikssprängning 1560–1812. Skrifter utgivna av Svenska litteratursällskapet i Finland. Vol. 702:2. Svenska litteratursällskapet i Finland/Bokförlaget Atlantis. ISBN 978-951-583-184-2.
