= Finland (disambiguation) =

Finland is a country in Northern Europe.

Finland may also refer to:

== Places ==
- Southwest Finland, sometimes referred to and transliterated as Finland Proper, a region of Finland.
  - Finland Proper (parliamentary electoral district), an electoral district of the Finnish Parliament.
- Grand Duchy of Finland, a predecessor state of the modern country, 1809–1917
- Finland Governorate, the name of the Vyborg Governorate of the Russian Empire in 1802–1812
- Diocese of Finland, a predecessor of the Diocese of Turku.
- Finland, Minnesota, an unincorporated community in the United States
- Finland, South Carolina, an unincorporated community in the United States
- Finland, a settlement in New Sweden at the site of modern Marcus Hook, Pennsylvania

== Other ==
- "Finland" (comedy song), a 1980 song by Monty Python, first released on Monty Python's Contractual Obligation Album
- Finland (European Parliament constituency)
- Finland Peak, a mountain in Alaska
- USS Finland (ID-4543), a World War I-era steamship

== See also ==
- Names of Finland
- Category:National sports teams of Finland, teams playing as "Finland"
- Finland Proper (disambiguation)
- Finlandia (disambiguation)
- Finnish (disambiguation)
- Suomi (disambiguation)
