= Varsinais-Suomi (disambiguation) =

Varsinais-Suomi (Egentliga Finland) is the name of a geographical region in Finland which can refer to:

- Varsinais-Suomi - a historical Province of Sweden (Historical provinces of Finland)
- Turun ja Porin lääni - a former Province of Finland (County of Sweden)
- Varsinais-Suomen maakunta - a current Region of Finland
- Western Finland - a current Province of Finland
