= Österland =

Medieval term for eastern part of the Kingdom of Sweden

Coordinates: 60.1733°N 24.9486°E

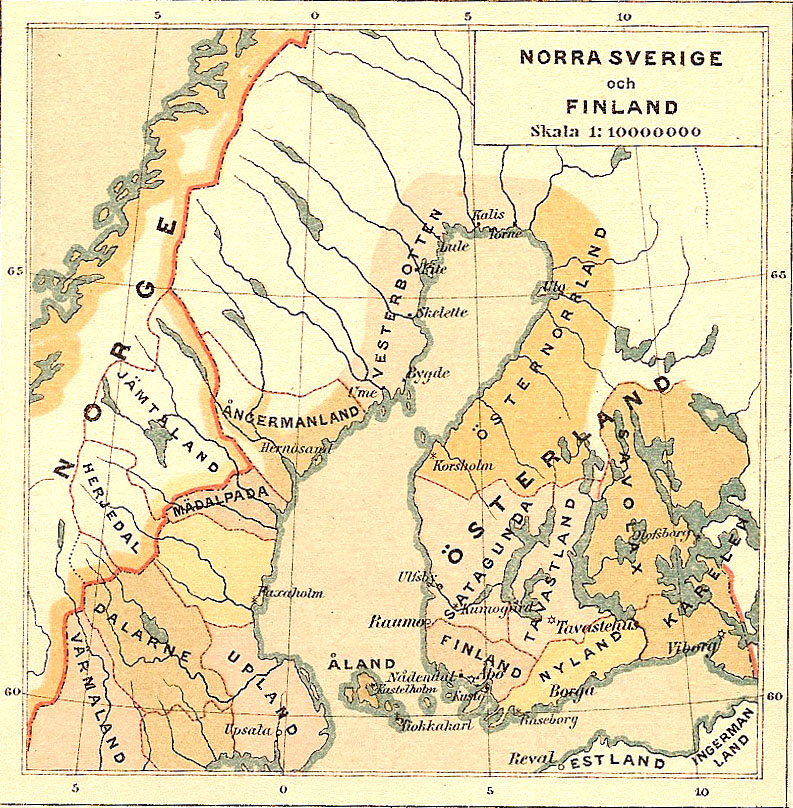
Österland on an 1880 map of medieval Sweden and Finland.

Österland or Österlanden (partes orientales), in Finnish Itämaa, is an older term for the eastern part of the Kingdom of Sweden, east of the Gulf of Bothnia and north of the Gulf of Finland. It corresponded to most of present-day Finland, including the area around Vyborg in what is now northwestern Russia.

The name is first attested in Swedish sources in 1308 and was gradually displaced by the term Finland from the second half of the 15th century onward. The last known instance in an official document dates from 1525.

== History ==
=== Incorporation in the 13th century ===
During the 13th century the Swedish kings claimed overlordship over the area corresponding to present-day southwestern Finland and incorporated it, under the influence of the Catholic Church, into the Swedish kingdom. The details of this process are not well documented: the traditional historiography of three "crusades" has been questioned by modern scholars, who doubt that the First Swedish Crusade took place at all as a crusade in the formal sense, since no contemporary sources attest to one.

=== Origins of the name (1308–1350s) ===
The name Österland is first attested in Swedish sources at the 1308 Örebro settlement between King Birger and his brothers, and became the official term for the area from that point. Use of the term expanded from the 1330s onward. Finland and Österlanden could initially appear as separate, complementary terms, with Österlanden denoting the areas east of Finland proper.

From around 1320 the term instead came to denote the whole of the Swedish territory east of the Bothnian Sea, with Finland proper as one of several constituent lands within Österlanden. By the middle of the 14th century the definite singular form Österlandet had come into written use. Before the shift, Finland had denoted only the southwestern area, corresponding to present-day Southwest Finland, though the term had at times extended over parts of Tavastia already in the 13th century.

The term acquired above all a legal-administrative meaning: a lawspeaker over the law province of Österland is attested from 1332. The central government likewise adopted the term for its developing administration: in 1340 the bailiff of Turku Castle was additionally made bailiff of Häme Castle and Vyborg, and in 1343 styled himself parcium orientalium prefectus ("governor of the eastern parts"). Occasionally the term was also given an ecclesiastical sense, with Österland referred to as a diocese — in practice no different from the Diocese of Turku.

=== The 1357 settlement and the law code ===
All areas of Österlanden were placed on an equal footing with the diocese of Turku at the 1357 Jönköping settlement between King Magnus and his son Eric. Bengt Algotsson, made Duke of Finland and Halland in 1353, styled himself in 1355 osterlandiarum et vtriusque Hallandie dux ("duke of Österlanden and both Hallands"); the precise meaning of the title is not established.

In ecclesiastical terms, the diocese of Turku was included in Magnus Eriksson's country law code (landslag) of around 1350, but no named law province was listed under it. Österland was thus not counted among the realm's law provinces in that particular enumeration, even though the right to take part in royal elections, according to Kari Tarkiainen, was already inscribed in the same code. According to Torbjörn Eng, this shows that the area was not, at that time, regarded in legal-political terms as a full part of the realm.

=== The 1362 royal election and division of the law province ===
A letter of 15 February 1362 concerning the region's right to take part in the Swedish royal election at the Stones of Mora described Österland as "a diocese and a law province" (lagsaga). The letter has long been regarded as marking Österland's final entry as a province on equal footing with the rest of the realm, though the Finnish delegation itself never reached the election site.

Österlandet was originally a single law province, which was divided in 1435 into the Norrfinne and Söderfinne law provinces, with the Aura River as the boundary. According to Jarl Gallén, the designations "northern" and "southern Österland" were considered unsuitable, though he does not explain why. Eng has objected that comparable name constructions did in fact work on other occasions — Ostrobothnia was already recorded in Latin as Østernorlandia in 1329, and a Västernorrland law province was formed in the 17th century — and suggests instead that the 1435 renaming reflected an ongoing process of political-legal integration of the province into the realm. Shortly afterward, the province's status gained a constitutional basis when "northern and southern Finland" were included among the realm's law provinces in the revised law code of 1442.

At the enfeoffment of Karl Knutsson on 4 July 1441, the council of the realm listed "all the realm's castles in Österland" as Vyborg, Raseborg, Häme, Turku and Korsholm; King Christopher of Bavaria confirmed the grant that same year using the equivalent phrase "all our castles in the diocese of Åbo", excepting Kastelholm and Åland.

As late as the 15th century, those who joined the Engelbrekt Rebellion and laid siege to Kastelholm were referred to as "österleningar" (Österlanders). It is unclear whether this was a term they used of themselves or simply how others referred to them.

=== Decline of the name ===
Around 1470, Ericus Olai described the realm east of the Bothnian Sea as "Finland with its associated provinces, namely: Tavastia, Karelia, Lapland, Nyland, Ostrobothnia and Åland", without mentioning Österland.

From 1464, and especially after 1500, the term Finland instead came to be used for the whole of the realm's eastern territory. Österlandet was mentioned in an official document for the last time in Gustav Vasa's charter of privileges for the city of Åbo on 7 June 1525, by then in a purely geographical rather than legal sense.

== Interpretation of the concept ==
=== Origins and function ===
Jarl Gallén has pointed out that the designation Österland occurred in Scandinavia as a more general description of the lands east of the Baltic Sea already in the early Middle Ages, so that an existing tradition of naming could be drawn on when the Swedish territories east of the Bothnian Sea needed a name. P. O. von Törne regarded the term as a purely geographical orientation, coined in Sweden by inhabitants describing "the land east of the sea". Both Gallén and von Törne consider it a term used by people in general, but Eng argues that much suggests it was also the central government's way of defining these areas of the Swedish realm — a view shared by the scholar Aulis Oja.

In a still broader sense, the term Österland was used throughout the Middle Ages to denote the Orient as well. At the 1617 Treaty of Stolbovo, for instance, there is mention of "Persia, Turkey, Crimea and other places in Österlanden". According to Eng, this ambiguity may have contributed to the term becoming unworkable once the region needed to be given an unambiguous status as a Swedish province.

=== Comparison with Norrland and political integration ===
The term Norrland, to which Österland is often compared, is attested later (the first half of the 15th century) but may be older. Ostrobothnia is already mentioned in the Latinised form Østernorlandia in 1329, which, according to Eng, suggests that the terms Österland and Norrland arose at roughly the same time, though Ostrobothnia was at that point related to a Norrland rather than an Österland.

Unlike Österland, Norrland never became a province in the political sense: no separate law province was formed there, and the national law code gave inhabitants of Norrland no right or obligation to take part in royal elections. Eng links this to the area's lack of a local frälse (nobility) on which the crown could rely, as well as to its never acquiring the same economic and strategic importance for the realm.

Eng argues that it was primarily an ongoing process of political-legal integration, rather than mere naming convenience, that lay behind the gradual replacement of Österland by Finland: a vague term that could suggest something outside the realm became increasingly unworkable as the area instead became one of the realm's central parts. He also points to the persistent conflict, first with Novgorod and later with Moscow, as a likely foreign-policy reason to give the area a clearer, unambiguous status within the realm.

== See also ==
- Finland under Swedish rule
- Historical provinces of Finland
- Lands of Sweden
- Götaland
- Norrland
- Svealand
