= Uusimaa (historical province) =

Historical province of Finland

Coordinates: 60.2167°N 24.9500°E

- Historical province
- Coat of arms

- Historical province of Uusimaa in blue (borders of the modern regions in yellow)
- Country: Finland; Sweden (before 1809)
- Regions: Uusimaa; Part of Kymenlaakso

Uusimaa (Swedish: Nyland; lit. 'new land') is a historical province in the south of Finland. It borders Finland Proper, Tavastia, Savonia, and Karelia. From the Middle Ages to 1809, most of the present-day Finland was a part of Sweden. Uusimaa was thus also included among the historical Swedish provinces. The modern province of Uusimaa is included within the borders of the historical province.

== History ==
Along with the rest of southern and western Finland, Uusimaa was ruled by the Kingdom of Sweden from the 12th or 13th century onwards. Coastal Uusimaa had earlier been semi-deserted, but was soon populated by Swedish settlers.

All the provinces of Finland were ceded to Russia in September 1809, after the 1808-1809 Finnish War. Uusimaa became Uudenmaan lääni in the old lääni (province) system until 1997, when it was merged into the new administrative province of Southern Finland. In 2010 the administrative provinces were abolished and Uusimaa was divided between two new regions of Finland, Uusimaa and Eastern Uusimaa. However, this arrangement lasted for only one year, and in 2011 Eastern Uusimaa was merged into Uusimaa, which now forms a single administrative unit once again.

== Culture ==
Historically, coastal Uusimaa was a Swedish-speaking area. However, the capital of Finland, Helsinki, and most of the other towns in Uusimaa now have Finnish-speaking majorities.

== Heraldry ==
The arms of Uusimaa were granted at the burial of Gustav I of Sweden in 1560. The arms are crowned by a count's coronet, though by Finnish tradition this more resembles a Swedish baronial coronet. Blazon: "Azure, between two bars wavy Argent, a boat Or with rudder."
