= Landskap =

Landskap is common Scandinavian word which means landscape or province and can refer to:

- Districts of Norway, the historical provinces of Norway
- Provinces of Sweden, the historical provinces of Sweden and Finland
- Historical provinces of Finland, the subset of historical provinces in current day Finland
- Regions of Finland, the regions of Finland from 1997 till 2009
- Åland, an autonomous and unilingually Swedish province of Finland

== See also ==
- Län
- Lands of Sweden
