= Jalmari Jaakkola =

Finnish historian (1885–1964)

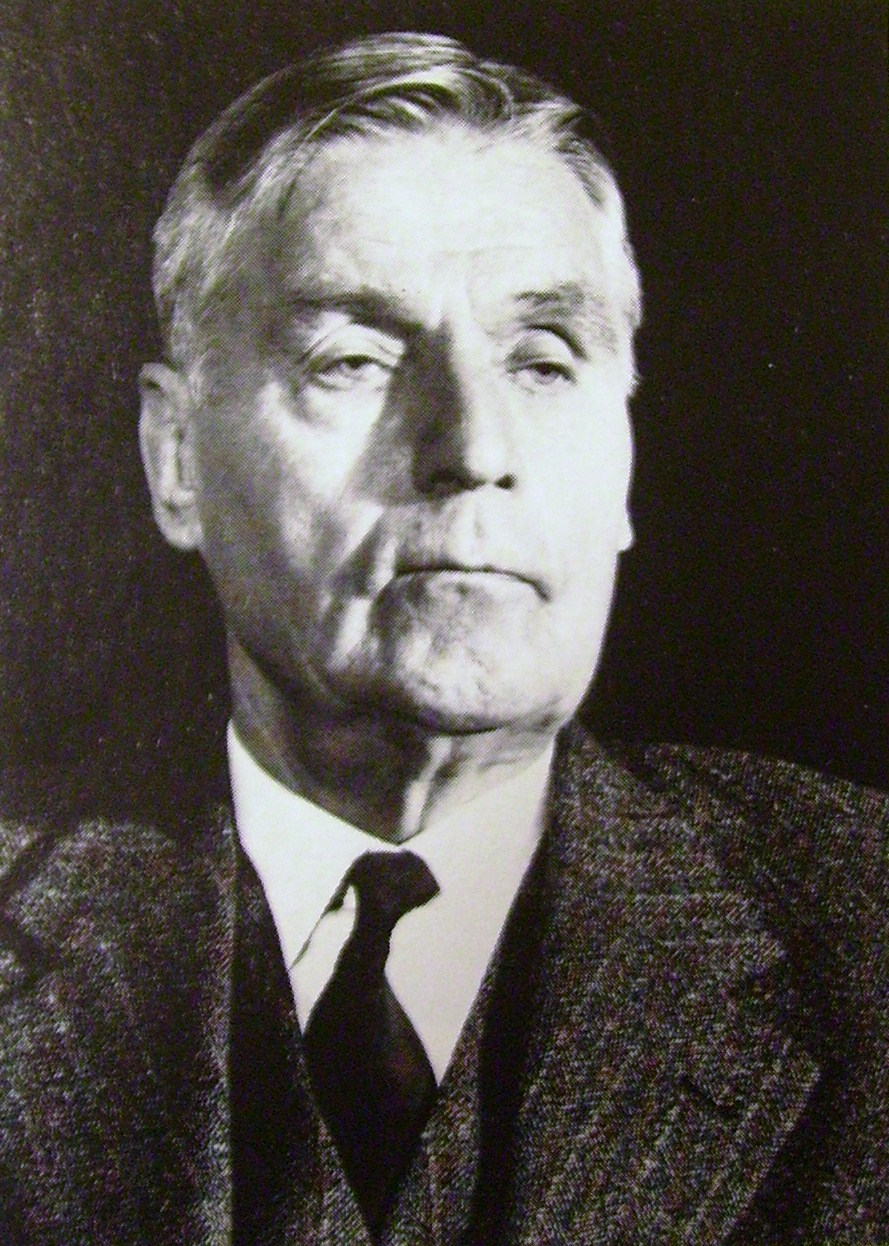
- Born: 1 January 1885; Eurajoki, Grand Duchy of Finland, Russian Empire
- Died: 12 February 1964 (aged 79); Helsinki, Finland
- Occupations: Historian; academic
- Years active: 1932–1954
- Employer: University of Helsinki
- Spouse: Katie Jansson
- Children: 1
- Parent(s): Markus Jaakkola; Johanna Fredrika Nuorante

Kaarle Jalmari Jaakkola (1 January 1885 – 12 February 1964) was a Finnish historian and a professor of Finnish history at the University of Helsinki between 1932 and 1954. Jaakkola is known as a historian who primarily researched medieval history and sought to put forth that Finland existed as an entity already during that period. Some of Jaakkola's hypotheses are today considered to be overtly nationalist and outdated, but his influence during his lifetime remains undisputed.

His other research interests included the historical origins of the Birkarls and Kvens, and the historical background of the Kalevala, a compilation of epic poetry.

== Early life and education ==
Jaakkola was born in Eurajoki to a peasant family of Markus Jaakkola and Johanna Fredrika Nuorante. He completed student matriculation in 1905 and studied history and Finnish language at the University of Helsinki. He made studying journeys to Germany and Sweden, and graduated with a bachelor's degree in 1909, a licentiate in 1921, and a PhD in 1923. The subject of his doctoral thesis was the legend of Saint Erik and its authenticity.

He worked as a teacher and a headmaster until he was appointed a docent of Nordic history in 1923, and later a professor of Finnish history in 1932.

== Work ==
The focus of his research was the medieval period of Finnish history, as he endeavoured to write a history extending from the ancient times for the newly independent country. He emphasized Finnish position in the Western sphere of influence and concentrated on the history of his home region, Satakunta. Jaakkola supported his historical research with toponymy, ethnopoetics, epic poetry, and sometimes extensive speculation. Many of Jaakkola's assertions have been refuted by later research.

Between 1935 and 1959, Jaakkola published an extensive five-volume synthesis on Finnish history from the Viking Age to the sixteenth century. The series is especially speculative in regard to the sections on history prior to the fourteenth century, although the books included almost all sources available in the Finnish history. The works were criticized by archaeologists at the time of their release. Despite this criticism, Jaakkola decided not to do any major changes for the reprints.

The central theme of the series was the medieval political history of Finland, during which, as Jaakkola argued, there was a period of ancient independence during which the country guarded its own interests. He envisioned Finland almost as a fourth member of the Kalmar Union, instead of an insignificant part of Sweden. The most theoretically sustainable conclusions of Jaakkola include viewing the Swedish crusades to Finland as more of a peaceful transition to Swedish rule and Catholicism rather than as a period of conflict. Jaakkola wanted to continue his series to cover the twentieth century, and the work was carried on by his students who wrote two works on the period of the Swedish rule, but after Jaakkola died in 1964, the series was discontinued.

After the Winter War, Jaakkola wrote the concise presentation of Finnish history, Suomen historian ääriviivat, which was meant for readers abroad. It was translated into several languages. During the Continuation War, President Risto Ryti commissioned Jaakkola to write Die Ostfrage Finnlands (1941), to argue for Finnish territorial expansion eastwards to the Kola Peninsula and East Karelia. Jaakkola's writing took on a nationalist and irredentist tone as he attempted to justify the Finnish expansion.

Despite the difficult style and academic nature of Jalmari Jaakkola's works, his influence on contemporary beliefs is considered to have been extensive. He chose the text, "The seer of early Finnish history", for his 75th anniversary memorial medal. He was the editor of the scientific journal Historiallinen aikakauskirja between 1935 and 1959. Jaakkola was awarded an honorary degree from the faculty of theology at the University of Helsinki and the faculty of philosophy at the University of Turku.

== Personal ==
Jaakkola married Katie Jansson in 1915, with whom he had one child.

== Selected publications ==
- Pyhän Eerikin pyhimystraditsionin, kultin ja legendan synty (1921).
- Pirkkalaisliikkeen synty (1923).
- Suomen muinaiset valtarajat vuoteen 1323 (1926).
- Kuningas Maunu Eerikinpojan unionipolitiikasta (1928).
- Vanhimmat historialliset kopiokirjamme (1931).
- Suomen varhaishistoria: Heimokausi ja ”kalevala-kulttuuri”. (1935).
- Suomen varhaishistoria (1935).
- Suomen varhaiskeskiaika (1938).
- Suomen historian ääriviivat (1940).
- Suomen idänkysymys (1941).
- Die Ostfrage Finnlands (1941).
- Suomen sydänkeskiaika (1944).
- Suomen myöhäiskeskiaika I–II (1950, 1959.)
