= Egentliga Finland =

Egentliga Finland (Varsinais-Suomi) is the name of a geographical region in Finland which can refer to:

- Finland Proper (Egentliga Finland in Swedish), a current Region of Finland and a historical Province of Sweden
- Åbo and Björneborg County - a former Province of Finland
- Southwest Finland - a current Province of Finland
