= Lapland (historical province of Finland) =

Historical province of Finland

Coordinates: 68°00′N 26°00′E

- Historical province
- Coat of arms

- Historical province of Lapland within the modern borders of Finland (borders of the modern regions in yellow).
- Country: Finland; Sweden (before 1809)
- Regions: Lapland (excluding Peräpohjola and historical Västerbotten)

Lapland (Finnish: Lappi, Swedish: Lappland) is a historical Finnish province in the north of Finland. The present-day Finnish region, modern province of Lapland contains also an Ostrobothnian area called Peräpohjola and the eastern part of historical Västerbotten, which lie outside of the historical Lapland.

Municipalities of historical Lapland are Enontekiö, Inari, Kittilä, Muonio, Pelkosenniemi, Savukoski, Sodankylä and Utsjoki, none of which is a city.

Lapland is not always counted among the historical provinces of Finland. Unlike the other provinces, it was not based on a medieval slottslän (castle fief), and before the 19th century, it was not usually considered part of Finland. For instance, a Swedish textbook from 1794 describes Finland as ending at Lapland's southern border. Culturally, Lapland was distinct from the rest of the country, having been inhabited primarily by the Sámi until the mid-17th century. The southern border of Lapland is based on the Lappmark border from 1795.

When Sweden ceded Finland to Russia in 1809, and the Grand Duchy of Finland was established, the eastern part of Swedish Lapland was incorporated into the Finnish provinces. Gradually, Lapland became integrated with the rest of Finland, and it began to appear as a Finnish province on maps starting in the 1910s.

Administratively, Lapland was part of the Oulu Province until 1938, when the Lapland Province was established from its northern parts. The provincial system (Finnish: läänit) in Finland was abolished in 2009, and today Lapland forms part of the Region of Lapland. Both the former province and the current region cover a larger area than the historical province of Lapland. They include not only the area of the historical Lapland, but also the northernmost parts of Ostrobothnia and the eastern parts of Västerbotten that were ceded to Russia in 1809.

== See also ==
- Sápmi
