= Finnish =

Finnish may refer to:

- Something or someone from, or related to Finland
- Culture of Finland
- Finnish people or Finns, the primary ethnic group in Finland
- Finnish language, the national language of the Finnish people
- Finnish cuisine

== See also ==
- Finish (disambiguation)
- Finland (disambiguation)
- Suomi (disambiguation)
