= Finland Proper (disambiguation) =

Finland Proper is a province in south-western Finland, the city of Turku being the capital.

Finland Proper may also refer to:

- Finland Proper (historical province), a historical province of the kingdom of Sweden with roughly the same area
- Varsinais-Suomi (parliamentary electoral district), also known as Finland Proper
- Mainland Finland, Finland excluding the Åland islands

== See also ==
- Finland
- Österland
- Sweden proper
