= Finlandia (disambiguation) =

Finlandia is a symphonic poem by Jean Sibelius.

Finlandia may also refer to:

== Music ==
- Finlandia Hymn, a section of the symphonic poem
- "Finlandia" (song), a 1981 song by Martha Ladly

== Business ==
- Finlandia (vodka), a brand of vodka
- Finlandia Records, a division of the Warner Classics classical music record label
- Finlandia Cheese, a subsidiary of Valio, Ltd., a dairy manufacturer in Finland

== Competitions ==
- Finlandia-Ajo, a horse racing event
- Finlandia-hiihto, a long-distance cross-country skiing competition
- Finlandia Trophy, a figure skating competition

== Vehicles ==
- MS Finlandia (1966), a ferry operated by Finland Steamship Company 1967–1975 and Finnlines 1975–1978
- MS Finlandia (1980), a cruiseferry operated by Silja Line 1981–1990
- MS Finlandia (2000), a cruiseferry operated by Eckerö Line since 2012
- TS TS Vanadis or Finlandia, a luxury turbine yacht
- Finlandia (car), a historic car brand
- Saab 900 CD or Finlandia

== Other uses ==
- Finland or Finlandia
- Finlandia (film), a 1922 propaganda and documentary film
- Sirkus Finlandia, a circus in Finland
- Finlandia Hall, a concert hall in Helsinki, Finland
- Finlandia Prize, a Finnish literature award
- Finlandia University, a private university in Hancock, Michigan
- the Finnish Labour Temple, also known as the Finlandia Club, a cultural and community centre in Thunder Bay, Ontario, Canada
- Finlandia (candy), fruit marmalade candy produced by Fazer

== See also ==
- Finland (disambiguation)
- MS Finlandia, a list of ships
