= Birkarls =

Historical group with tax privileges

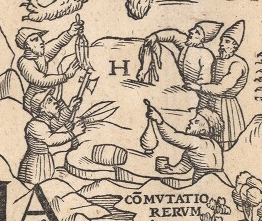
Trading near Pello, as depicted by the Carta Marina (1539).

The Birkarls (Swedish: birkarlar; Finnish: pirkkalaiset) were a small, unofficially organized group that controlled taxation and commerce in central Lappmarken in Sweden from the 13th to the 17th century.

== Background ==
Birkarls (bircharlaboa) are first mentioned in 1328, when they are listed as one of the settler groups in northern Hälsingland, a designation that covered the western coast of Gulf of Bothnia all the way up and around the gulf to Oulu River.

The name birkarl probably originates from an ancient Scandinavian word birk that has been used in reference to commerce in various contexts.

In the late 16th century, claims about birkarls coming from Great Pirkkala (a parish in Upper Satakunta) emerged, propagated by birkarls themselves in their battle to prevent the state from stripping their privileges. This is at least partly true, since men from Pirkkala appear as witnesses in a document from 1374 about local borders in northern Pohjanmaa. Later, in the 19th century, a Finnish term pirkkamiehet or pirkkalaiset was invented as a "domestic" name for birkarls. It never appears in any of the documentation or traditions, but is commonly used in Finland today to mean birkarls.

In total, some twenty theories are estimated to exist to explain the origin and name of the birkarls.

== Sami trade and tax monopoly ==
The main purpose of the birkarl organization was to control the trade with Sami people and tax them. Legends told that birkarls rights to tax Sami people was given by Magnus the Barnlock, the King of Sweden at that time. Sami people were traditionally taxed by Norwegians already in the Viking Age or even earlier. Later Russians started to tax them as well. After having southern Finland under control around 1250, Sweden became interested in the situation in the north. Eventually, some Sami people paid taxes to all three states. Birkarls were just one element in the colonial system profiting off of the Sami area.

It seems that birkarls' privileges were more de facto, than de jure. No document has survived granting them official right to the tax and trade monopoly in the north, even though the state first supported and later tolerated the situation for centuries.

== Area of influence ==
Birkarls were active in the Tornio, Luleå and Piteå River valleys, Tornio being their main area. Each of the valleys formed a separate "lappmark" with its own birkarls. Sami people south of Piteå were "Crown Samis" that paid their taxes directly to the king.

The birkarls living in each area of influence were very few, totalling only about 50 men still in the early 16th century.

In the 16th century, towards the end of their existence, the Kemi River valley was also partly under birkarl influence. In the 1590s, they also tried to gain tax control of the sea Sami people on the Arctic Ocean.

== Decline and end ==
Birkarls remained useful to the king as long as the state's hold on the north was weak. After the disintegration of the Union of Kalmar in the early 16th century, the situation in the north became more important. A major setback for birkals took place in 1553, when King Gustav Vasa terminated their right to tax the Sami people. Unable to continue their former lives, many birkarls became local tax authorities (lapinvouti in Finnish).

The Birkarls' trade monopoly did not last much longer and was in decline from the 1570s. The state wanted to concentrate trade into towns that were easier to control, making the need for birkarls obsolete. Having no official status, birkarl organizations had little means of fighting back, and they silently eroded away in the 17th century after administrative changes initiated by king Charles IX. Tornio, Luleå and Piteå all received their town charters in 1621 marking an official end to birkarls.
