= Suomi =

Suomi may refer to:

- Finland in Finnish
- Finnish language
- Suomi (surname)
- Suomi, Minnesota, an unincorporated community
- Suomi College, in Hancock, Michigan, now referred to as Finlandia University
- Suomi Island, Western Australia, Australia
- Suomi KP/-31, a Finnish submachine gun
- Suomi NPP, a weather satellite
- 1656 Suomi, a Mars-crossing asteroid

== See also ==
- Names of Finland
- Suomalaiset, the name of the Finnish people
- Suomirokki, Finnish rock music
- Suomisaundi, a style of freeform psychedelic trance music originating from Finland
- Suomy, an Italian brand of motorcycle helmets
