= Historical provinces of Finland =

The historical provinces (Finnish: historialliset maakunnat, Swedish: historiska landskap) are former administrative or cultural areas of Finland, with origins from the slottslän (linnalääni) of the Middle Ages. The historical provinces ceased to be administrative entities in 1634 when they were superseded by the counties (lääni), a reform which remained in force in Finland until 1997. The historical provinces play a relatively minor role in popular consciousness, while the modern regions (maakunta, lit. 'province') tend to hold greater significance for regional identity—though this varies across the country.

Historical provinces of Finland (the borders of modern regions with yellow colour)

The first name in the parentheses is the Finnish name and the second is the Swedish one.

Finland Proper (Varsinais-Suomi, Egentliga Finland)

Karelia (Karjala, Karelen)

Lapland (Lappi, Lappland)

Ostrobothnia (Pohjanmaa, Österbotten)

Satakunta (Satakunta, Satakunda)

Savonia (Savo, Savolax)

Tavastia (Häme, Tavastland)

Uusimaa (Uusimaa, Nyland)

Åland (Ahvenanmaa, Åland)

== History ==
Slotsslän (linnalääni) of Finland roughly align with the historical provinces.

Most of the historical provinces are defined by slottslän (linnalääni), which was an administrative system established by Birger Jarl and King Magnus Ladulås. The historical provinces which can be defined by slottslän are

- Åland (Kastelholm slottslän)
- Finland Proper (Turku slottslän)
- Satakunta (Kokemäenkartano slottslän)
- Uusimaa (Raseborg slottslän and Porvoo slottslän)
- Karelia (Viipuri slottslän)
- Häme (Hämeenlinna slottslän)
- Ostrobothnia (Korsholm slottslän)
- Savo (Savonlinna slottslän).

The administrative system was replaced in 1634, when the historical provinces and slottslän were replaced by counties. Even after this, names of the historical provinces were used for the names of the counties, and also as the basis for the territorial definition of the counties. The old symbols of the historical provinces continued to exist in the coats of arms of the counties. Lapland was not considered part of Finland before the formation of the Grand Duchy of Finland in 1809.

The historical provinces gained a new meaning as part of the national awakening in the 19th century. Such as in Zacharias Topelius' Maamme, where the Finnish tribes based on historical provinces and their perceived stereotypes played a central role in the book.

== Heraldry ==
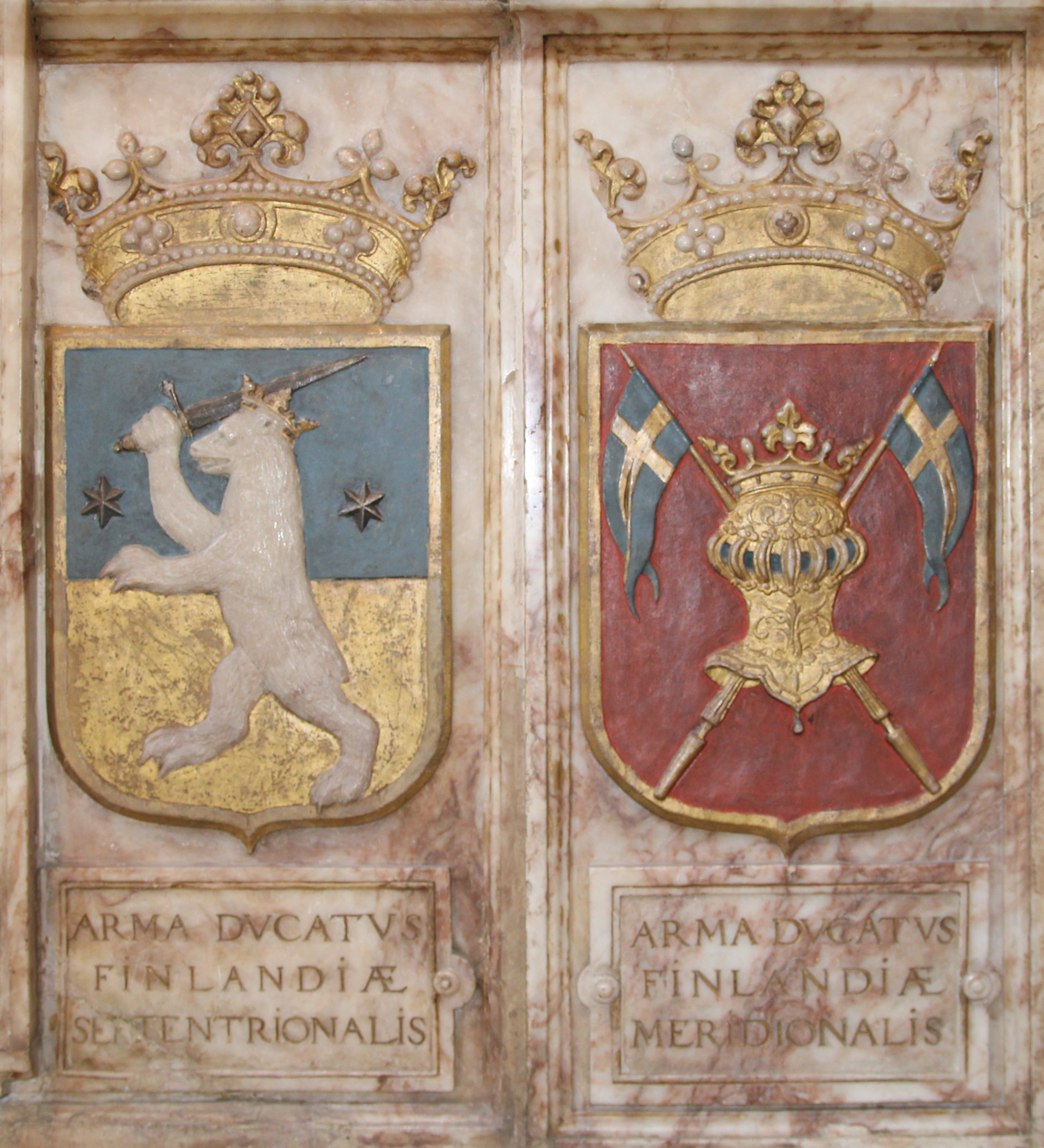
Tomb of Gustav Vasa where the coats of arms of Satakunta and Finland Proper are visible

At the funeral of King Gustav Vasa in 1560, the coats of arms for the provinces were displayed together for the first time and several of them had been granted for that particular occasion. After the separation of Finland from Sweden in 1809 the traditions for the provincial arms have somewhat diverged. Finland maintains the distinction between ducal and comital dignity shown in the coronets for arms of the historical provinces, while all the Swedish provinces have carried the Swedish style ducal coronet since 1884. The division of Lapland also necessitated a distinction between the Finnish and the Swedish coats of arms.

The coats of arms of the historical provinces have served as a basis for the arms of the current administrative divisions, the regions of Finland.

== See also ==
- Historical provinces of Sweden and Finland
- Österland
- Regions of Finland
