= Suomi (surname) =

Suomi is a surname literally meaning 'Finland' in the Finnish language. Notable people with this surname include:

- Al Suomi (1913–2014), American ice hockey player
- Damion Suomi, American singer-songwriter and guitarist
- Eemeli Suomi (born 1995), Finnish ice hockey player
- Heidi Suomi (born 1975), Finnish sprinter
- John Suomi (born 1980), Canadian baseball player
- Stephen Suomi, American psychologist
- Verner E. Suomi (1915–1995), Finnish-American educator, inventor, and scientist
