= Swedish Crusades =

Part of the Northern Crusades, the Swedish Crusades were campaigns by Sweden in Finland and Novgorod. They include:

- First Swedish Crusade (1150s)
- Second Swedish Crusade (1240s)
- Third Swedish Crusade (1293)
- Swedish–Novgorodian Wars
