= MS Finlandia =

MS Finlandia may refer to the following ships:

- MS Finlandia (1966) – a ferry operated by Finland Steamship Company 1967–1975 and Finnlines 1975–1978.
- MS Finlandia (1980) – a cruiseferry operated by Silja Line 1981–1990.
- MS Finlandia (2000) – a cruiseferry operated by Eckerö Line 2012-
- MS Finlandia (2003) – a ro-ro freighter operated by Finnlines 2003 onwards.
