= Oripää =

- Municipality
- Oripään kunta Oripää kommun
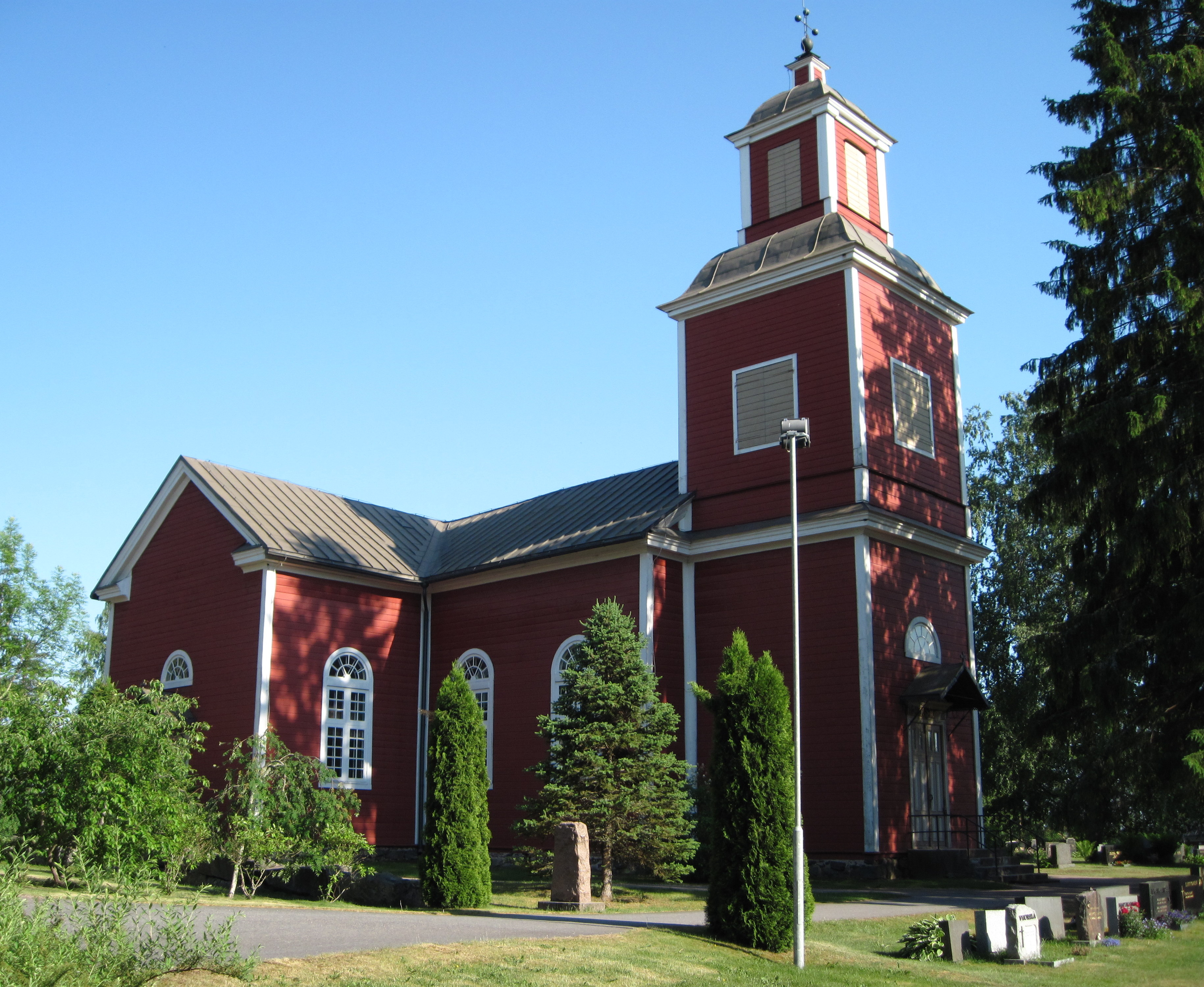
- Oripää Church

- Coat of arms

- Location of Oripää in Finland
- Interactive map of Oripää
- Coordinates: 60°51′20″N 022°41′50″E
- Country: Finland
- Region: Southwest Finland
- Sub-region: Loimaa

Government
  - Municipal manager: Asta Suominen

Area (2018-01-01)
  - Total: 117.72 km^{2} (45.45 sq mi)
  - Land: 117.78 km^{2} (45.48 sq mi)
  - Water: 0.1 km^{2} (0.039 sq mi)
  - Rank: 291st largest in Finland

Population (2025-12-31)
  - Total: 1,264
  - Rank: 281st largest in Finland
  - Density: 10.73/km^{2} (27.8/sq mi)

Population by native language
  - Finnish: 90.2% (official)
  - Others: 9.8%

Population by age
  - 0 to 14: 16.3%
  - 15 to 64: 55.9%
  - 65 or older: 27.8%
- Time zone: UTC+02:00 (EET)
  - Summer (DST): UTC+03:00 (EEST)
- Climate: Dfc
- Website: oripaa.fi/in-english/

Oripää (Finnish pronunciation: [ˈoriˌpæː]) is a municipality of Finland. It is located in the Southwest Finland region. The municipality has a population of 1,264 (31 December 2025) and covers an area of 117.72 square kilometres (45.45 sq mi) of which 0.1 km^{2} (0.039 sq mi) is water. The population density is 10.73 inhabitants per square kilometre (27.8/sq mi). The municipality is unilingually Finnish.

An agricultural show OKRA is held in Oripää every two years.

== History ==
Oripää is named after a nearby hill, Orivuori (literally the "stallion mountain"), which may also have been called Oripää ("stallion head") at some point. As a village, Oripää is first mentioned in 1421. It was a part of the Pöytyä parish, but administratively a part of the Kumogård castle fief (linnalääni/slottslän), i.e. Satakunta. In the 15th century, the bishop of Turku had five leasehold farms in the village.

Oripää gained chapel rights in 1778 and became an independent parish in 1901.
