= Provinces of Sweden =

Historical and cultural geographical region

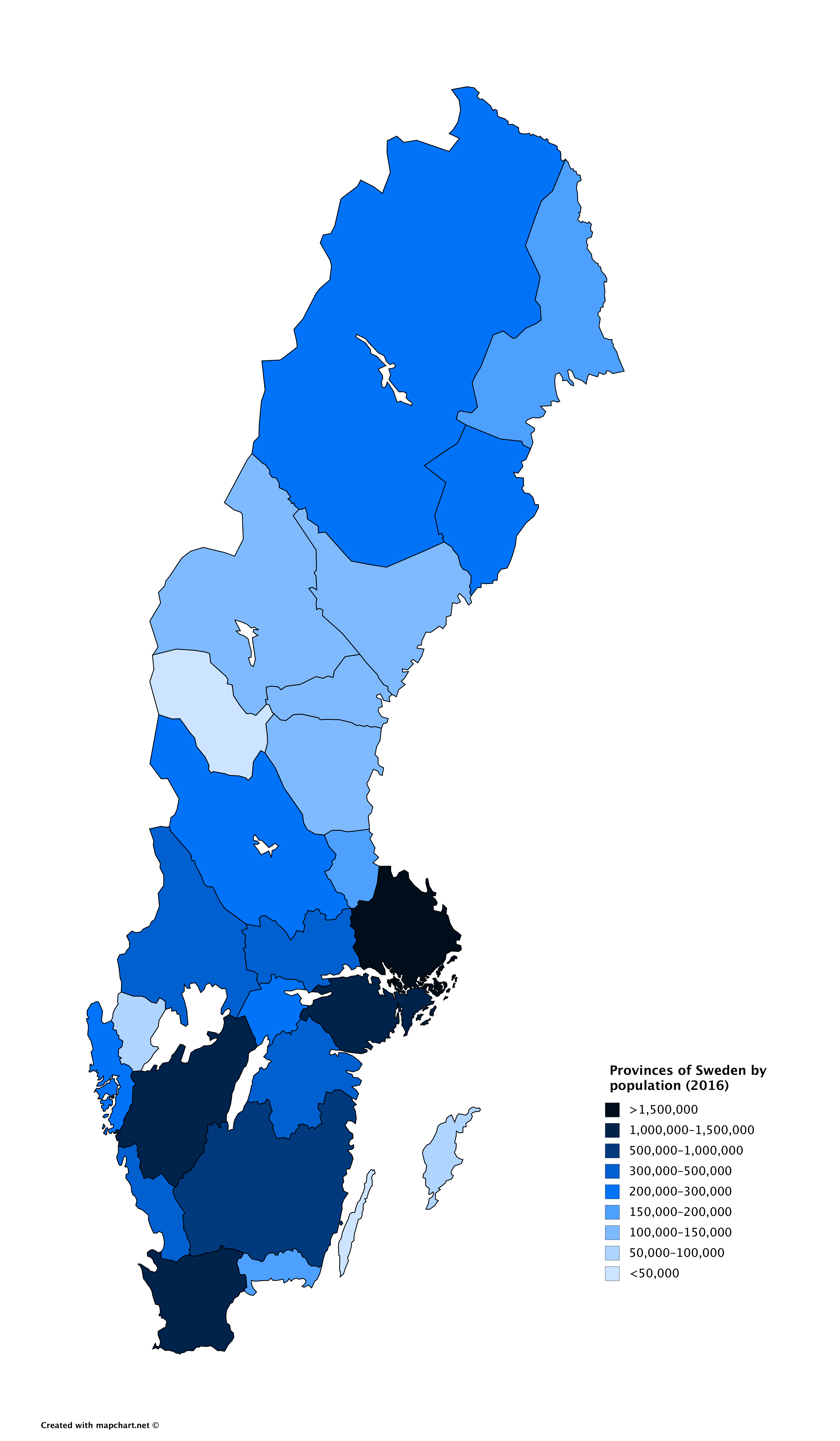
Population of Swedish provinces in 2016

The 25 provinces of Sweden (Swedish: Sveriges landskap) are historical, geographical and cultural regions. They have no administrative function, but retain their own cultural identities, dialects and folklore.

Several were administrative subdivisions until 1634, when they were replaced by the counties of Sweden (län). Some were conquered later on from Denmark–Norway. Others, like the provinces of Finland, have been lost.

In some cases, the county and province borders correspond almost exactly, as with Blekinge and Blekinge County. The island of Gotland is both a province, a county and a municipality (kommun). The only other province to share a name with a modern municipality is Härjedalen, though the borders are not quite the same. Administrative borders are subject to change – for example, several of today's counties were created in the 1990s – while the provincial borders have remained stable for centuries. All the provinces are also ceremonial duchies, but as such have no administrative or political functions.

Nevertheless, the provinces of Sweden are no archaic concept; they are still referenced in everyday speech and seen as culturally distinct. The main exception is Lapland, where most people see themselves as citizens of Västerbotten or Norrbotten, based on the counties.

Sweden's two largest cities, Stockholm and Gothenburg, both have provincial borders running through them: Stockholm is split between Uppland and Södermanland, and Gothenburg is split between Västergötland and Bohuslän. According to a 2011 survey, people in major cities – Stockholm, Gothenburg and, to a lesser extent, Malmö – identify primarily with their city, rather than their province.

== Provinces ==
Swedish	Latin
Ångermanland	Angermannia (Note: also Angermania)
Blekinge	Blekingia (Note: also Bleckingia provincia, Blechingia)
Bohuslän	Bahusiana provincia
Dalarna	Dalecarlia (Note: also Dalia)
Dalsland	Dalia
Gästrikland	Gestricia
Gotland	Gotlandia (Note: also Godlandia, Gothia, Gothlandia, Guthia, Gutlandia)
Halland	Hallandia (Note: also Halandia provincia)
Hälsingland	Helsingia
Härjedalen	Herdalia (Note: also Herndalia, Harnedalia)
Jämtland	Iemtia (Note: also Iemptia provincia, Jemtia)
Lappland	Lapponia (Note: also Lappa, Lappia, Loppia)
Medelpad	Medelpadia
Närke	Nericia (Note: also Neringa)
Norrbotten	Botnia septentrionalis
Öland	Oelandia (Note: also Olandia)
Östergötland	Ostrogothia (Note: also Gothia orientalis)
Skåne	Scania (Note: also Schonia)
Småland	Smolandia
Södermanland	Sudermannia (Note: also Sudermannia provincia)
Uppland	Uplandia
Värmland	Wermelandia provincia
Västerbotten	Westrobotnia (Note: also Bothnia occidentalis)
Västergötland	Westrogothia (Note: also Gothia occidentalis, Westragothia)
Västmanland	Westmannia provincia

Norrland

Svealand

Götaland

English and other languages occasionally use Latin names for Swedish provinces. The name Scania for Skåne is particularly common in English. Some English exonyms and spellings, such as the Dales for Dalarna, East Gothland for Östergötland, Swedish Lapland for Lapland and West Bothnia for Västerbotten, are also found in English literature.

== History ==
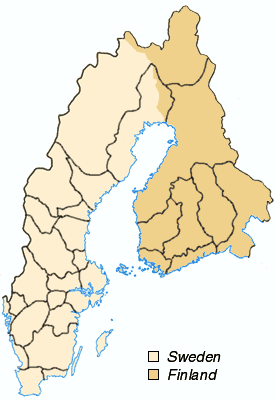
Sweden's provinces from 1658 to 1809

The origins of the provincial divisions lay in the petty kingdoms that gradually became more and more subjected to the central monarchy during the consolidation of Sweden. Until the country law of Magnus Eriksson in 1350, each of these lands still had its own laws and its own assembly (thing), and in effect governed itself. The first provinces were considered duchies, but newly conquered provinces received the status of duchy or county, depending on importance.

After the separation from the Kalmar Union in 1523, the Kingdom incorporated only some of its new conquests as provinces. The most permanent acquisitions stemmed from the Treaty of Roskilde in 1658, in which the former Danish Scanian lands (Skåne, Blekinge and Halland), along with Gotland and the Norwegian Bohuslän, Jämtland and Härjedalen, became Swedish and gradually integrated. Other foreign territories were ruled as Swedish Dominions under the Swedish monarch, in some cases for centuries. Norway, in personal union with Sweden from 1814 to 1905, never became an integral part of Sweden.

When Sweden ceded Finland to the Russian Empire in 1809, Västerbotten was divided up so that Norrbotten first emerged as a county. Eventually, it came to be recognized as its own province. It was granted a coat of arms as late as in 1995.

Some scholars suggest that Sweden revived the concept of provinces in the 19th century.

=== The lands of Sweden ===
Historically, Sweden was seen as containing four "lands" (larger regions):

- Götaland (southern Sweden)
- Svealand (central Sweden)
- Österland (Finland, from the 13th century to 1809)
- Norrland (northern parts of present-day Sweden and north-western Finland)

In the Viking Age and earlier, Götaland and Svealand were home to a number of petty kingdoms that were more or less independent; Götaland in the Iron Age and Middle Ages did not include Scania and other provinces in the far south, which were then part of Denmark. The leading tribe of Götaland in the Iron Age was the Geats; the main tribe of Svealand, according to Tacitus ca 100 AD, was the Suiones (or the "historical Swedes"). "Norrland" was all the unexplored northern parts, the boundaries and Swedish control over which were weakly defined into the early modern age.

Due to the Northern Crusades against Finns, Tavastians and Karelians and colonisation of some coastal areas of the country, Finland fell under the Catholic Church and Swedish rule. Österland ("Eastern land"; the name had early gone out of use) in southern and central Finland formed an integral part of Sweden. Russia annexed Finland in 1809, and reunited it with some frontier counties annexed earlier to form the Grand Duchy of Finland. In 1917, Finland became an independent country.

The regional borders have changed several times throughout history with changing national borders. Norrland, Svealand and Götaland are only parts of Sweden, and have never superseded the concept of the provinces.

== Heraldry ==
Västerbotten's arms with a ducal coronet

At the funeral of King Gustav Vasa (Gustav I) in 1560, the arms for 24 provinces of Sweden, including Finland, were displayed together for the first time, most of them created for that occasion. Erik XIV of Sweden modelled the funeral processions on those of German dukes, who in turn may have styled their displays after Emperor Charles V's funeral, where a host of banners represented each entry in the King's long list of titles. Gustav Vasa's title only had three entries – "King of Sweden, the Goths and the Wends" – so banners were created for each Swedish province for a better display.

Some of these arms were short-lived, such as the beaver for Medelpad (changed in the 1570s), the wolverine for Värmland (changed in 1567) and the roses on Småland's arms. Östergötland was represented by two different arms, one with a Västanstång dragon and one with a Östanstång lion. The current arms for Östergötland (see below) were created in 1884.

The current arms for Småland were created for the coronation of John III in 1569. The wild man representing Lapland was created for the funeral of Charles IX in 1612. Arms for Jämtland were created when Norway ceded the province to Sweden in 1635. Arms for Härjedalen were created later. The arms for Blekinge, Bohuslän, Halland and Skåne were created for the funeral of Charles X Gustav in 1660. The Arms for Norrbotten were created as late as 1995.

At Erik XIV's coronation in 1561, a division of the provinces into 'duchies' (hertigdom) and 'counties' (grevskap) was introduced. However, this system never achieved lasting stability. In 1884, the King in Council gave all provinces the right of use to a ducal coronet for their coat of arms. Some of the Finnish provinces, which were separated from Sweden in 1809, still feature a count's coronet.

=== Götaland ===
Götaland comprises ten provinces in the southern part of Sweden. Until 1645, Gotland and Halland were parts of Denmark. Also, until 1658 Blekinge and Scania were parts of Denmark, and Bohuslän was part of Norway. Värmland was counted as part of Götaland until 1812.

Bohuslän

Dalsland

Västergötland

Östergötland

Småland

Öland

Gotland

Halland

Scania (Skåne)

Blekinge

=== Svealand ===
Svealand comprises six provinces in central Sweden. Until 1812, Värmland was counted as part of Götaland instead.

Dalarna

Värmland

Västmanland

Närke

Uppland

Södermanland

=== Norrland ===
Norrland today comprises nine provinces in Northern and central Sweden. Until 1645 the provinces of Jämtland and Härjedalen were parts of Norway. In 1809, when Sweden ceded Finland to the Russian Empire, the old province of Lapland was split into Swedish Lapland and Finnish Lapland. Norrbotten was separated from Västerbotten at the same time, and developed its own provincial identity during the 19th century.

Lapland

Norrbotten

Västerbotten

Jämtland

Ångermanland

Medelpad

Härjedalen

Hälsingland

Gästrikland

== See also ==
- Lands of Sweden
- Dominions of Sweden
- Historical provinces of Finland
- Counties of Sweden
