= Häme =

Historical province in southern Finland

Coordinates: 62.1700°N 24.5656°E

Häme Tavastia
- Historical province
- Coat of arms

- Historical province of Häme in blue (borders of the modern regions in yellow)
- Country: Finland
- Regions: Major parts of: Kanta-Häme; Päijät-Häme; Central Finland; Minor parts of: North Savo; South Savo; Kymenlaakso; Southwest Finland; Pirkanmaa

Häme, also known as Tavastia, (Note: Old Norse: Tafæistaland; Swedish: Tavastland; also called Yam (Ямь) or Yem (Емь) in Russian sources.) is a historical province in the south of Finland. It borders Finland Proper, Satakunta, Ostrobothnia, Savo and Uusimaa.

== History ==
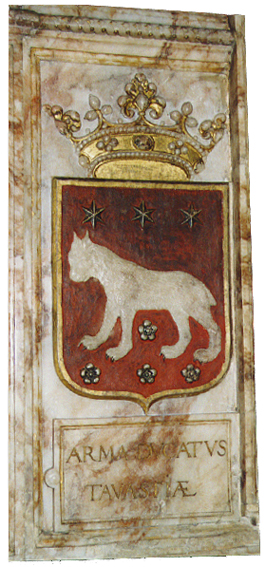
The coat of arms of "Tavastia" on the tomb of Gustav Vasa (1560) is the earliest surviving image of a coat of arms.

The province has been inhabited since the Stone Age. Northern Häme was for a long time a wilderness inhabited by Sami hunter-gatherers and frequented also by Finnish hunters. Only during the late Middle Ages was agriculture slowly introduced to the northern parts of the province.

Häme is first mentioned in an 11th-century Viking Age runestone (Gs 13) located in present-day Gävle, Sweden, where it is referred to as tafstalonti. At that time, Häme was said to stretch "from salt sea to salt sea," encompassing what would later become the provinces of Uusimaa and Satakunta, and including the inhabited regions of Southwest Finland within its arc.

Numerous prehistoric weapons, like Ulfberht swords, and hillforts have been unearthed in the Häme region, indicative of its rich historical significance.

The prehistoric era of Häme can be said to end with the Second Swedish Crusade in 1239 or 1249, when it became part of Sweden. After the successful campaign into Häme, the Swedes advanced further east until they were stopped by a Novgorodian army led by Prince Alexander Yaroslavich, who defeated the Swedes during the Battle of the Neva in July 1240 and received the sobriquet Nevsky for his victory in the battle. The construction of the Häme Castle began in the 1260s, on the orders of Birger Jarl. It was to be the centre of the three Slottslänen - "castle fiefs, castle counties", sg. Slottslän - the other two being the castle of Turku (Swedish: Åbo) in Finland Proper and Viipuri (Swedish: Viborg) castle in Karelia. After the peace Treaty of Nöteborg in 1323 the castle lost some of its importance as a defence against the East but remained an administrative centre. When Finland was ceded to Russia in September 1809, the province ceased to be a part of Sweden. The provinces have no administrative function today but live on as a historical legacy in both Finland and Sweden.

In the 19th century, the growth of the forest industry started to bring new wealth to the area. The waterways of Näsijärvi and Vanajavesi provided easy transport for timber. The most notable centres of the paper industry were, and still are, Mänttä and Valkeakoski. The most notable industrial center in historical Häme, however, is Tampere, where a number of large textile mills and metal factories have been operating since the early 19th century.

== Administrative history ==
The historical province of Häme has undergone several administrative changes since the Middle Ages. From 1634 to 1831, it was part of the Uusimaa and Häme Province (Nyland and Tavastehus County), which encompassed much of the historical provinces of Häme and Uusimaa. In 1809, Häme, along with the rest of Finland, was ceded to the Russian Empire and incorporated into the autonomous Grand Duchy of Finland.

In 1831, the inland portion of Nyland and Tavastehus County, corresponding largely to historical Häme, was separated to form the Häme Province , which continued as an administrative province throughout the Russian era and into independent Finland. This province existed until 1997.

As part of a nationwide administrative reform in 1997, Häme Province was merged into two larger provinces: Southern Finland and Western Finland, both of which were abolished in 2010 when the provincial system was discontinued entirely.

Since then, the territory of historical Häme has been divided among several modern regions (maakunta, landskap). The core area is now represented by Kanta-Häme, Päijät-Häme and Central Finland. Smaller portions also lie within the regions of Pirkanmaa and Kymenlaakso. In contemporary context, the name Häme is most commonly used for the region of Kanta-Häme located in the southwestern section of the historical Häme province.

== Geography ==
Western Häme extends over both sides of the great Kokemäenjoki drainage basin. In Eastern Häme, the regions of Päijät-Häme and Central Finland are located around the shores of Lake Päijänne. The Southern borders of the province roughly follow the Salpausselkä ridge. The Southern parts of the province consist of plains intermixed with fields and forests. Towards the north, the land gradually rises and becomes more hilly. At the same time, the proportion of cultivated land decreases, and forest and heath become increasingly dominant. The northern boundary of Häme is in Central Finland. As this area was settled only at the time of the replacement of the old system of slottläns with the system of administrative provinces, the ancient provincial boundary is uncertain in this area. The same applies to the northwestern border with Satakunta, which is located in Pirkanmaa.

As a result of the original pattern of settlement, the inhabited areas are located around the waterways, fields encircling especially the largest lakes. The lakes are navigable but the rapids of Kymijoki and Kokemäenjoki restrict navigation to the sea. Similarly, the lakes form three separate navigable areas. Lake Näsijärvi can be navigated for over 100 kilometers north of Tampere, while the lakes Pyhäjärvi, Vanajavesi and Roine have been connected by canals since the 19th century, forming another significant waterway. On the other hand, Lake Päijänne, the second largest lake in Finland, connects Lahti and Päijät-Häme to Central Finland and Jyväskylä.

== Heraldry ==
Arms granted at the burial of Gustav I of Sweden in 1560. The arms are crowned by a ducal coronet, though by Finnish tradition this more resembles a Swedish count's coronet. Blazon: "Gules, a lynx passant or, ear tufts sable; in chief three mullets of six, in base four roses, all argent".

== In popular culture ==
- The fourth studio album by Finnish black metal band Havukruunu is called Tavastland after the province.

== Sources ==
- Fonnesberg-Schmidt, Iben (2007). The popes and the Baltic crusades, 1147–1254. Brill. ISBN 9789004155022.
- Rasila, Viljo (2003). "Häme ennen ja nyt". In Alenius, Jari; Ahokas, Lari; Koskela, Jarmo (eds.). Kaikuja Hämeestä (in Finnish). Helsinki: Suomalaisen Kirjallisuuden Seura. ISBN 951-746-469-X.
