= Diocese of Turku =

Diocese of Turku may refer to the three phases of the ecclesiastical jurisdiction with episcopal see in Turku (Åbo), in Finland:

- the former Roman Catholic Diocese of Turku (Åbo), later becoming the:
- Bishopric of Turku, originally Roman Catholic, later Lutheran, later becoming:
- the present Lutheran Archdiocese of Turku.
