= Ostrobothnia (historical province) =

Historical province of Finland

Coordinates: 65.5167°N 27.6333°E

- Historical province
- Coat of arms

- Historical province of Ostrobothnia in blue (including the historical Västerbotten) and modern regions of Finland in yellow
- Country: Finland; Sweden (before 1809)
- Regions: Southern Lapland; Kainuu; North Ostrobothnia; Central Ostrobothnia; Ostrobothnia (administrative region); South Ostrobothnia

Ostrobothnia (Swedish: Österbotten; Finnish: Pohjanmaa) is a historical province comprising a large portion of western and northern Finland. Before the Treaty of Fredrikshamn in 1809, Ostrobothnia was part of Sweden. It is bounded by Karelia, Savo, Tavastia (Häme) and Satakunta in the south, the Bothnian Sea, Bothnian Bay and Swedish Norrbotten in the west, Lapland in the north and Russia in the east.

== Etymology ==
The word botten derives from Old Norse botn, meaning 'bay'. It is Latinized as Bothnia.

The Finnish word pohja means either 'north' or 'bottom', and maa is 'land'. There are two possible explanations for the dual meaning of pohja. The first is based on the ancient Scandinavian belief that the north was the bottom of the world, where the Sun disappeared each night. The second explanation points to the fact that houses were constructed with their backs to the north, the coldest direction, which may have given rise to the association.

== Government ==
Ostrobothnia corresponds to the following modern regions: Ostrobothnia, Northern Ostrobothnia, Central Ostrobothnia, Southern Ostrobothnia and Kainuu, and the southern part of Lapland, which is known as Peräpohjola. It is governed by the regional state administrative agencies of Länsi- ja Sisä-Suomi and Pohjois-Suomi; the former includes areas outside Ostrobothnia (Central Finland and Häme).

== History ==
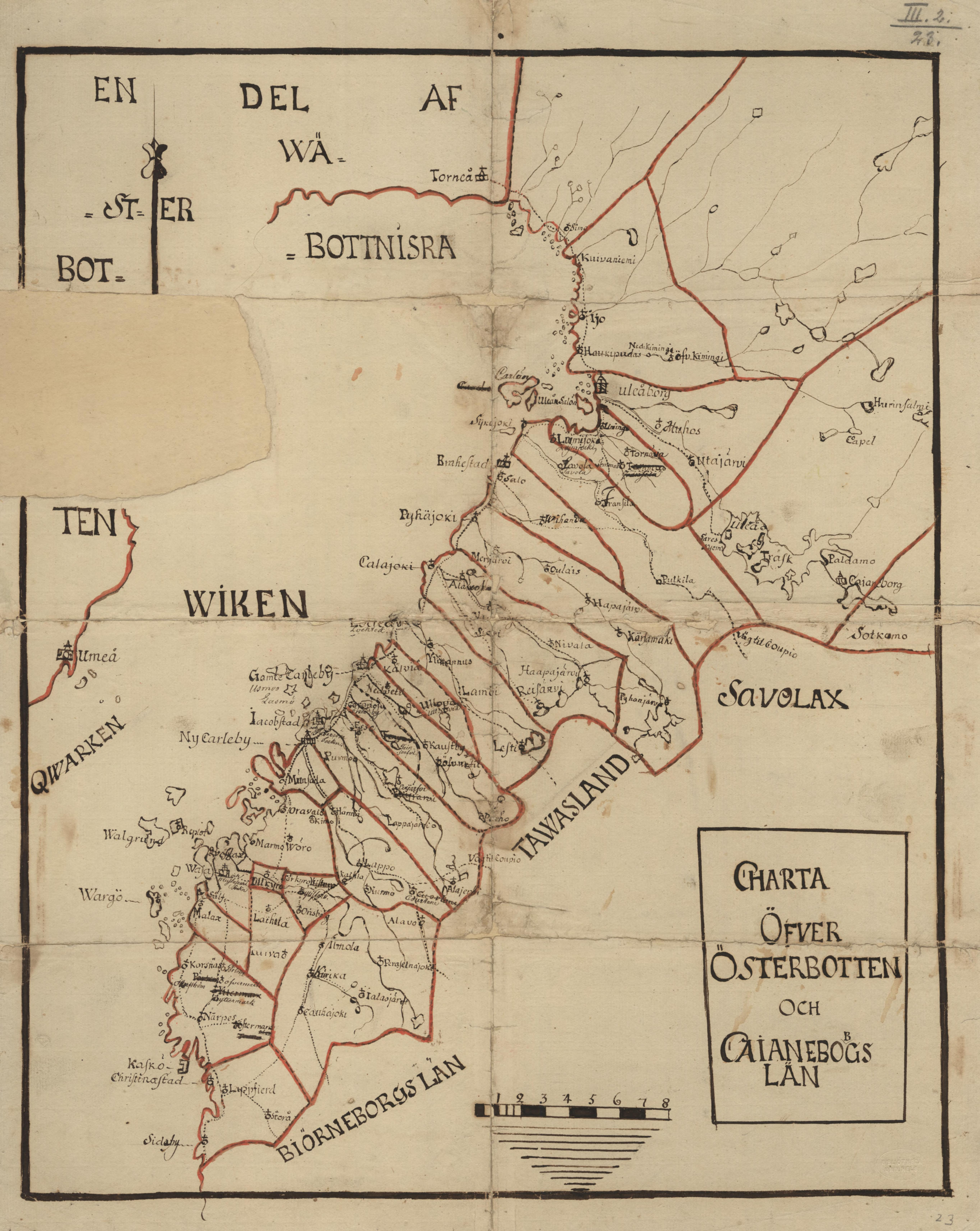
18th century map of Ostrobothnia's parishes as well as cities and churches.

The Susiluola Cave near Kristinestad in Ostrobothnia has been suggested to have been inhabited by Neanderthals, possibly dating back 120,000 years to the Last Interglacial. If confirmed, it would represent the earliest known human settlement in Fennoscandia. However, the interpretation of the findings is disputed, and the claim remains controversial within the scientific community.

Modern humans arrived 9,000 years ago, as soon as the ice sheet disappeared and enough land had risen above sea level. A complex hunter-gatherer society emerged along the coast. Among the visible remains from this time are the Neolithic stone enclosures unique to Ostrobothnia known locally as Giant's Churches (Finnish: Jätinkirkko). They are a rare example of monumental architecture built by hunter-gatherers in northern Europe.

During the Bronze and Iron Ages an agrarian society eventually replaced earlier structures in southern Ostrobothnia, whereas traditional economies survived much longer in the northern and inland locations. During the early Middle Ages settlers from Sweden inhabited the coastal strip of southern and central Ostrobothnia, eventually forming administrative units under Swedish rule. The Swedish crown established Korsholm as the administrative centre. At the same time, large parts of inland Ostrobothnia were colonized by Finnish settlers from Savonia. By the 16th century, Finnish settlement and agriculture had reached the northern part of the east coast of the Gulf of Bothnia (north of Kalajoki). This led to severe clashes with the Orthodox Christian Karelians, who were supported by their suzerain, Russia. Throughout the late 16th century, both parties engaged in constant raids against enemy civilian populations, even though formal peace existed for much of the time. For instance, in the winter of 1590, men of Ii and Liminka raided the Pechenga Monastery on the Arctic Sea, while the Karelians raided Ii and Liminka, burning almost all dwellings. The war slowly ebbed due to the Treaty of Tyavzino in 1595.

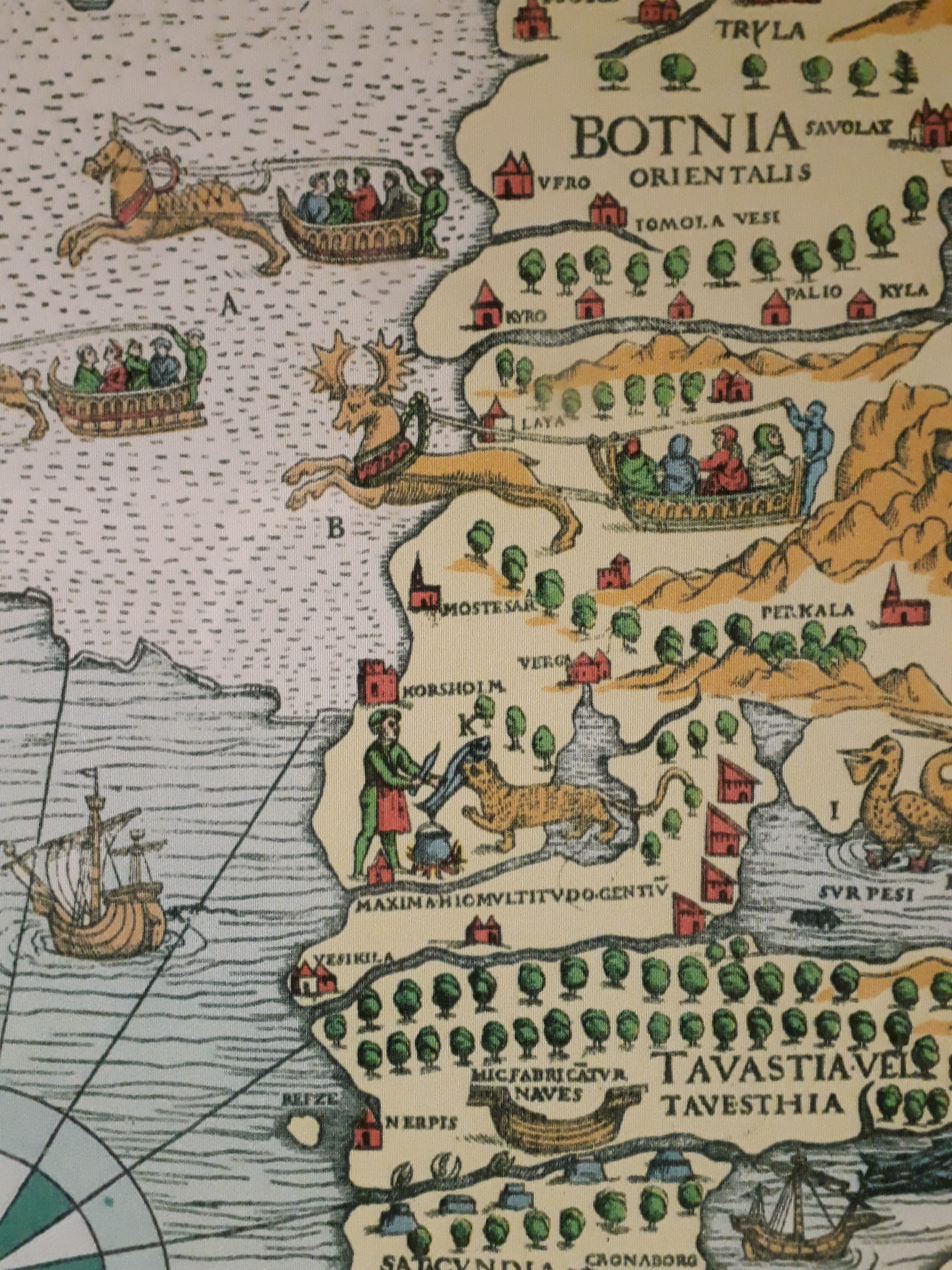
A coastal area of Ostrobothnia featuring in Olaus Magnus' 1539 map, Carta marina.

During the late stages of the war, the Swedish crown stationed regular troops in the province to help defend the population. This was in marked contrast to the earlier practice of making the province responsible for its own defence. After the war, the Ostrobothnians revolted against the troops' continued presence, leading to the Cudgel War, the last peasant uprising in Finnish history. The peasants suffered devastating losses and the province was no longer a semi-independent, unregulated frontier.

Katarina Asplund (1690–1758), a Finnish pietist, was a leading figure within the pietism movement in Ostrobothnia, and was often in conflict with the authorities on charges of blasphemy.

The first towns in Ostrobothnia were established in the 17th century, obtaining prominence through the import of pine tar, which was essential for the maintenance of the wooden ships of the period. During the Great Northern War the province was occupied from 1714 to 1721 by Russian troops, along with the rest of Finland. In Ostrobothnia the troops engaged in the creation of a wide strip of no-man's land between occupied Finland and Sweden proper. Northern Ostrobothnia suffered most heavily, losing a fourth of its population due to the ravages of war.

In 1809 all of Finland, including Ostrobothnia, was separated from Sweden, though the regions of Norrbotten and Västerbotten remained on the Swedish side.

== Geography ==
Historical Ostrobothnia was separated from southern Finland by Suomenselkä, a drainage divide which directs the flow of water north to the Merenkurkku or Perämeri and south to the Gulf of Finland or Selkämeri. To the east, it was bordered by Russian Karelia on the Maanselkä watershed, which divides the estuaries of the Oulujoki and Iijoki from the estuaries of rivers flowing to the White Sea. The northern borders are poorly defined, partly because permanently fixed habitations were a relatively new phenomenon at the time of the introduction of the county system, which replaced the older provincial divisions. On the coast, the border ran somewhere between the Torniojoki and Iijoki, without any formal definition inland, though the watershed between the Kemijoki, Iijoki and Olhavajoki estuaries serves as an approximate definition.

The stereotypical topographic feature of historical Ostrbothnia was the coastal plain north of Suomenselkä, in the modern regions of Ostrobothnia, Southern Ostrobothnia and Central Ostrobothnia. It is glacial (Weichselian glaciation) seabed, flat with a few hills, and characterized by rivers formed at the end of the glaciation period which run southeast to northwest. Post-glacial rebound is still causing the ground level to rise at a rate of about 9 mm per annum. Due to the flat terrain, this causes the Gulf of Bothnia to recede several kilometers each century, impacting navigation and the harbours of coastal cities in the region. The bedrock in the area, where exposed, features southeast-northwest oriented lines carved by rocks pushed by the advancing ice mass during the glaciation. When the ice melted, huge boulders (glacial erratics) and sand pits were also left behind.

On the coast of modern Northern Ostrobothnia, the topography remains flat, but instead of the fields of modern Central and Southern Ostrobothnia, the land is largely covered with marsh. Inland the landscape is dominated by coniferous forests and hills, with an occasional village or small town. The most important geographical feature of inland Ostrobothnia is the 887 km^{2} lake Oulujärvi. Most activity in the region of Kainuu is centered around this lake, which is connected to the sea via the Oulujoki. North of Kainuu, Koillismaa forms one of the most rural and poorest sub-regions in Finland.

== Heraldry ==
The coat of arms is crowned by a count's coronet, though in Finnish tradition it more closely resembles a Swedish baron's coronet. The blazon is azure, with six ermines courant argent, tail-tips sable.
