= Savo (historical province) =

Historical province of Finland

Coordinates: 62.5833°N 27.8167°E

- Historical province
- Coat of arms

- Historical province of Savo in dark blue (modern regions bordered in yellow)
- Country: Finland; Sweden (before 1809)
- Regions: Major parts of: North Savo; South Savo; Minor parts of: North Karelia

Savo, or Savonia (Finnish: Savo; Swedish: Savolax), is a historical province in the east of Finland. It borders Tavastia, Ostrobothnia and Karelia. Savo is now divided into two provinces: North Savo and South Savo. The largest cities in Savo by population are Kuopio, Mikkeli, Savonlinna, Varkaus and Iisalmi.

== Administration ==
In the 19th century, Savo was divided between Kuopio Province and Mikkeli Province. From 1997 to 2010, it lay within the administrative province of Eastern Finland. The provinces have no administrative function today but survive as ceremonial units. Since 2010, Savo has been divided between the regions of North Savo and South Savo.

== History ==
The province of Savo represents the original homeland of the Savonians, one of the subgroups that later became assimilated to form the Finns. It was the heartland of the east Finnish or Savo dialects.

The people of Savo traditionally pursued slash-and-burn agriculture, which settlers successfully imported into Ostrobothnia and Kainuu, Värmland in southwestern Sweden, and eastern Norway. Settlers from Savo also migrated to Finnish Karelia, Ingria (see: Ingrian Finns) and to southern Sweden, parts of northern Sweden, and Norway (see: Forest Finns).

Savo, which had been a part of Sweden from the late-13th century, was separated from Sweden when Finland was ceded to Russia in September 1809.

== Culture and stereotypes ==
Traditionally, the Savo people have often been considered as "sneaky" by other people in Finland. Recent research has shown that this reputation is largely due to misunderstandings caused by Savonians' traditional lack of social directness.

== Heraldry ==
The coat of arms of Savo has remained largely unchanged since the 1560s. It was first publicly displayed at the funeral of King Gustav Vasa in 1560, as part of a procession of 24 provincial banners. The design was likely created by a court artist under the direction of King Erik XIV. The earliest known depiction is found in the Armorial suédois, a 1562 manuscript discovered in the 1930s in the National Library of France.

Blazon: "Sable, a drawn hand bow in and arrow aimed toward the dexter chief, or; bow string, arrowhead and feathered tail, argent." The traditional colors of the province are black and gold. Initially, the arrow pointed heraldically to the left, but was later changed to the right, which is considered the standard forward-facing direction in heraldry. Today, the South Savo region uses the original left-pointing version, while North Savo uses the right-facing version. The shield can be topped with a comital crown.

The bow symbol has been interpreted as representing Savo's historical role as Sweden’s easternmost border province prior to the 1617 Treaty of Stolbovo. The modern form of the arms was officially confirmed by the Ministry of the Interior in 1962, based on a design by heraldist Ahti Hammar. The blazons of the historical provinces were confirmed in 1963.

The bow motif also appears in many municipal coats of arms in the region.
