= Slottslän =

Administrative unit in Sweden from late 13th century to 1634

A slottslän (Finnish: linnalääni) was a type of secular (Note: The church had its own administrative system.) administrative division throughout the Kingdom of Sweden from late 13th century to 1634. The administrative center was a castle. Slottslän were divided into municipalities and administrators. The term slottslän can be translated as "castle fief". Although the word "län" literally means fief, in Sweden it is translated as "county" and in Finland as "province".

There existed multiple different types of slottslän, there existed pantlän, which could be assigned to a lord as compensation for a loan to the crown, until a repayment was done. There also existed kronolän, which were managed by an advocatus, if the advocatus was a military commander, would be referred to as a "hövitsman", which was a capitaneus, they were ordered to deliver and report surplus profit to the crown, however sometimes a fixed sum was to be delivered annually, where the advocatus got to retain some profit. There also existed län which were granted to noblemen for their services to the King.

Slottsläns were established by Birger Jarl to replace the lething system in the latter-half of the 13th century. Slottsläns were disbanded in 1634 following Axel Oxenstierna's land reform and replaced with provinces.

== Slottsläns in Sweden ==
slottslän	administrative centre	modern region(s)
Axevalla län	Axevalla hus	Västra Götaland
Dalaborgs län	Dalaborg Castle	Västra Götaland
Ekholms län	Ekholm Castle	Västra Götaland
Gullbergs län	Gullbergs hus	Västra Götaland
Hofs län		Östergötland
Lindholmens län	Borgen Lindholmen	Västra Götaland
Lödöse län	Lödösehus	Västra Götaland
Olsborgs län	Olsborg Castle	Västra Götaland
Openstens län	Opensten Castle	Västra Götaland
Orreholmens län	Orreholmens kungsgård	Västra Götaland
Ringstaholms län		Östergötland
Stegeborgs län		Östergötland
Stynaborgs län	Stynaborg Castle	Västra Götaland
Telgehus län	Telge hus	Södermanland
Vadstena län	Vadstena Castle	Stockholm, Östergötland
Älvsborgs län	Älvsborg Castle	Västra Götaland

=== Slottsläns in Finland ===
slottslän	administrative centre	est.	disest.	modern region(s)
Porvoon linnalääni Borgå län	Porvoo	1523	1619	Uusimaa, eastern half without northern part of Hyvinkää from Kymenlaakso: southwestern part of Kouvola
Kastelholman linnalääni Kastelholms län	Kastelholm Castle	1388	1634	Åland
Korsholman linnalääni Korsholms län	Korsholm Castle	1384	1634	Central Ostrobothnia; Kainuu; Northern Ostrobothnia; Coastal Ostrobothnia without Kaskinen, Korsnäs, Kristinestad and Närpes; Southern Ostrobothnia without Isojoki, Karijoki, Soini and Ähtäri; Lapland, southernmost part
Kokemäenkartanon linnalääni Kumogårds län	Kokemäki Castle; Kokemäenkartano; Pori	1331	1634	Satakunta without Eura, Rauma and southern part of Eurajoki; Pirkanmaa without Akaa, Pälkäne, Urjala and Valkeakoski from Coastal Ostrobothnia: Kaskinen, Korsnäs, Kristinestad and Närpes from Southern Ostrobothnia: Isojoki, Karijoki, Soini and Ähtäri from Finland Proper: Loimaa, Oripää and northern part of Pöytyä from Central Finland: Keuruu and Multia
Savonlinnan linnalääni Nyslotts län	Olavinlinna Castle	1475	1634	South Savo without Pertunmaa and southern part of Mäntyharju; North Savo without Kaavi, Keitele, Rautalampi, Rautavaara, Vesanto and easternmost part of Kuopio
Raaseporin linnalääni Raseborgs län	Raseborg Castle		1634	Uusimaa, western half without Karkkila and Vihti
Hämeenlinnan linnalääni Tavastehus län	Häme Castle		1634	Kanta-Häme; Päijät-Häme; Central Finland without Keuruu and Multia from North Savo: Keitele, Rautalampi and Vesanto from Uusimaa: Karkkila, Vihti and northern part of Hyvinkää from South Savo: Pertunmaa and southwestern part of Mäntyharju from Finland Proper: Loimaa from Kymenlaakso: northwestern part of Kouvola
Viipurin linnalääni Viborgs län	Vyborg Castle	1293	1634	South Karelia without Parikkala; Kymenlaakso without western half of Kouvola from South Savo: southern parts of Mikkeli and Mäntyharju from Leningrad Region, Russia: Vyborg District from Saint Petersburg, Russia: almost the whole Kurortny District
Turun linnalääni Åbo län	Turku Castle		1634	Finland Proper without Loimaa, Oripää, Somero and northern part of Pöytyä from Satakunta: Eura, Rauma and southern part of Eurajoki
