= Satakunta (historical province) =

Historical province of Finland

Coordinates: 61.7000°N 21.8833°E

- Historical province
- Coat of arms

- Historical province of Satakunta in blue (borders of the modern regions in yellow)
- Country: Finland; Sweden (before 1809)
- Regions: Major parts of: Satakunta (region); Pirkanmaa; Minor parts of: South Ostrobothnia; Southwest Finland; Central Finland

Satakunta (Swedish: Satakunda) is a historical province of Finland consisting of the regions of Satakunta and a majority of Pirkanmaa, (Note: The municipalities of Pirkanmaa not included are: Akaa, Pälkäne, Urjala and Valkeakoski.) as well as consisting of the municipalities of Soini and Ähtäri of South Ostrobothnia, Keuruu and Multia of Central Finland, as well as Loimaa and Oripää of Southwest Finland. The historical province is bordered by the historical provinces of Tavastia, Ostrobothnia and Finland Proper. The total area of the historical province is about 24,300 km^{2} (9,388/sq mi).

== Heraldry ==
The coat of arms of Satakunta is one of the oldest coat of arms of a historical region of Finland. The coat of arms originates from the coat of arms being granted by King Gustav Vasa to his son John III in 1557, following John III having become the duke of Finland Proper and Satakunta.

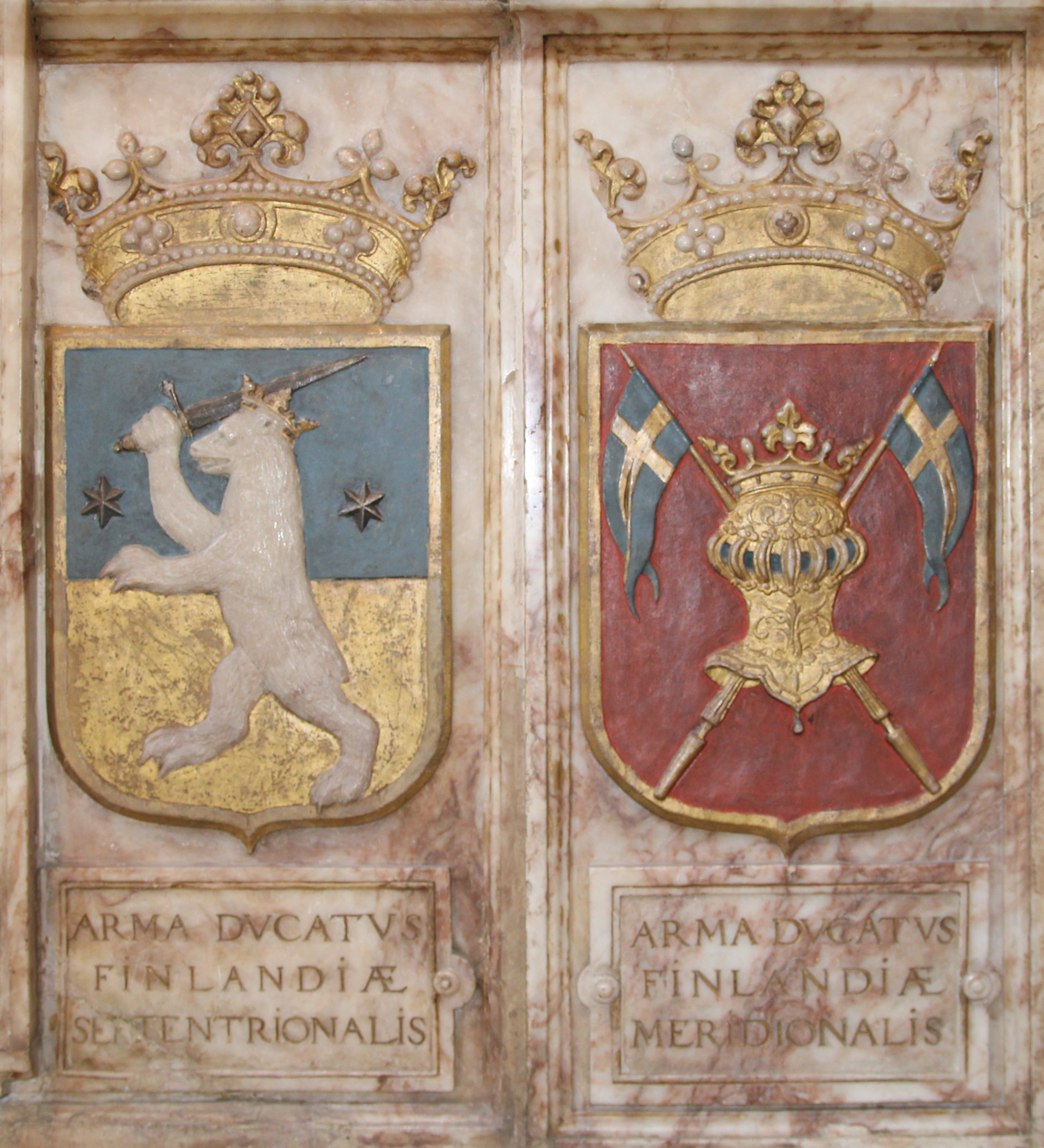
The coat of arms of Satakunta visible on Gustav Vasa's cenotaph in Uppsala Cathedral.

The symbolism of the bear on the coat of arms refers to the wild nature in Satakunta. In the 19th century, the coat of arms began to be used by tax collectors in Satakunta, through which it began to become an established symbol as the coat of arms Satakunta.

== Subdivisions ==
Satakunta is further divided based on the hundreds that were used in the 15th century for Satakunta, in which Satakunta is divided into Upper Satakunta and Lower Satakunta. Most of Upper Satakunta belongs to the region of Pirkanmaa today, whilst the region of Satakunta is mostly made up of Lower Satakunta.

The administrative centers of Lower Satakunta were Teljä and Käräjämäki, Teljä had a marketplace on the bank of the Kokemäenjoki, and Käräjämäki was known for profitable fishing. Upper Satakunta had its administrative center in Suur-Pirkkala, which is currently in Tohloppi, Tampere. The terms Upper and Lower Satakunta are still used by organizations, educational institutions and companies, however not by government-affiliated organizations.

Lower Satakunta in dark red and Upper Satakunta in light red.
