= Lappmarken =

Old Swedish name for a region in northern Sweden and Finland

Lappmarken (light yellow) on the map of Västerbotten (light and dark yellow), circa 1796

Lappmarken, or Lapland (Swedish: Lappland), was the northern part of the old Kingdom of Sweden inhabited by the Sami people. In addition to the present-day Swedish Lapland, it also covered Västerbotten, Jämtland and Härjedalen, as well as the Finnish Lapland. As a name, it is related to Finnmark, an old Norwegian name for the Sami area. Finn and Lapp are mutually exchangeable old names for the Sami people, but both are now considered offensive.

Already in the Middle Ages, Lappmarken consisted of "lappmarks" whose Sami people were loosely governed either by the crown or birkarls. The purpose of lappmarks was largely colonial in nature. Originally, each consisted of a river valley with its surrounding areas from the Gulf of Bothnia up to the fjelds. The first lappmarks were:

- Lycksele lappmark (Ume River valley)
- Åsele lappmark (Ångerman River valley)
- Tornio lappmark (Tornio River valley)
- Piteå lappmark (Pite River valley)
- Luleå lappmark (Lule River valley)
- Kemi lappmark (Kemi River valley, separated from Tornio lappmark in 1633)

The state tightened control over Lappmarken in the 17th century with the downfall of the birkarl system and establishment of the state controlled towns. The county of Norrland was established in 1634 for the state administration on the region while the parallel concept of Lappmarken continued to regulate the Sami people and their relations with the settlers.

The Lappmark Proclamation in 1673 stipulated that anybody who settled in the Sami region would be granted tax exemption for 15 years and would not have to serve as a soldier in any war. Since the Sami people contributed significantly to the public treasury, the settlers were allowed only to colonise land that was considered "unused".

The proclamation was renewed in 1695. Sami people heavily protested against it, but in vain. Sami people were de facto forced to leave large areas and retreat northwards. Individual taxes were also removed from the Sami people, and their taxes were put on the Sami villages. This system was in place until 1928.

The Lappmark Regulation in 1749 ordered settlers to stay away from hunting and devote themselves to farming and the keeping of livestock. The colonial rights were now also opened up to the Sami people. Two years later, Västerbotten was separated from Lappmarken and its inhabitants were forbidden to hunt or fish in the Sami area. By now the then Lappmarken was also known as Lappland.

In 1809, Sweden ceded the eastern part, along with Finland, to the Russian Empire, which in effect created a Swedish Lapland and Finnish Lapland. With the loss of Kemi and Tornio lappmarks and further retreat of the Sami people, Lappmarken in Sweden gradually lost its purpose. The remaining area was incorporated to the general state administration in the early 20th century. However, the name "lappmark" still bears a legal meaning and is widely used in the Sami-related legislation in Sweden.

Today, the Swedish part is no longer an administrative subdivision in Sweden (rather, it is part of Västerbotten and Norrbotten counties). On the Finnish side, there was a Province of Lapland (much larger to the south, especially by population, and where there were no Sami for many centuries) from 1938 until 2010, when Finnish provinces were discontinued, and the province was replaced by the Region of Lapland.

== See also ==
- Sápmi – Sámi cultural region of Fennoscandia
