= Finland Proper (historical province) =

Historical province of Finland

Coordinates: 60.4936°N 22.2967°E

- Historical province
- Coat of arms

- Historical province of Finland Proper in blue (borders of the modern regions in yellow)
- Country: Finland; Sweden (before 1809)
- Regions: Southwest Finland (excluding Somero and Loimaa)

Finland Proper or Southwest Finland (Finnish: Varsinais-Suomi; Swedish: Egentliga Finland) is a historical province in southwestern Finland, administered by its historic capital of Turku (Swedish: Åbo). Before the Treaty of Fredrikshamn in 1809, it was part of Sweden. It borders Satakunta, Tavastia (Häme), and Uusimaa. It is also bounded by the Baltic Sea facing Åland. The historical provinces have no administrative function today but live on as a historical legacy in Finland and Sweden.

The modern region of Southwest Finland largely corresponds to the historical province. However, the modern region includes Loimaa, which was historically part of Satakunta, and Somero, which historically belonged to Tavastia.

Southwest Finnish dialects are spoken in Southwest Finland.

== Administration ==
Southwest Finland was within the boundaries of the administrative province of Turku and Pori from 1917 to 1997 and that of Western Finland from 1997 to 2009, when the provinces of Finland were abolished.

== History ==
Finland Proper was historically the core region referred to by the name "Finland", a designation that later came to encompass the entire eastern part of the Swedish realm, replacing the older term Österland ("Eastern land").

The region became part of the Kingdom of Sweden during the 13th century. Christianization in the area had already began around the 11th century, initially in the region around Kalanti. The first ecclesiastical center was established in Nousiainen, later moved to Koroinen, and finally relocated to Turku (Åbo) in 1290. Turku served as the administrative and ecclesiastical center of Finland during the Swedish era.

Finland Proper and other provinces of Finland were ceded to the Russian Empire following the Finnish War in 1809. The position of Turku weakened after the capital was moved to Helsinki in 1812 and further after the Great Fire of 1827, which led to the university’s relocation to Helsinki. After Finland's independence in 1917, the position of Turku grew stronger and it became home to two new universities: Åbo Akademi and the University of Turku.

== Heraldry ==
The arms of Finland Proper date back to 1557, when they formed part of the heraldic emblems of the Duchy of Finland, granted by King Gustav Vasa to his son John (later John III). The coat of arms was displayed at the burial of Gustav Vasa in 1560 and also appears on his funerary monument in Uppsala Cathedral. The blue forked flags bearing golden Scandinavian crosses have attracted particular attention, as they predate the adoption of the modern Swedish flag, which was officially introduced by John III in 1569.

The formal Latin name of the duchy was Ducatus Finlandiae Meridionalis, meaning "Duchy of Southern Finland." The blazon is: Gules, a crowned jousting helmet in front of two lances in saltire, all Or. On each lance is attached a forked hanging flag azure, charged with a Scandinavian cross Or. The arms are crowned by a ducal coronet.

The arms of Finland Proper were revived and formalized as provincial coats of arms in the 19th century.
