= Karelia (historical province) =

Historical province of Finland

Coordinates: 61.8792°N 30.1136°E

- Historical province
- Coat of arms

- Finnish Karelia until 1940: in lighter blue the area ceded to the Soviet Union in that year, now part of Russia.
- Country: Finland; Before 1812: Finland; Russia; Before 1809: Russia; Sweden
- Regions: Major parts of: North Karelia; South Karelia; Minor parts of: North Savo; South Savo; Kymenlaakso; In present-day Russia: Ladoga Karelia; Karelian Isthmus

Map of North Karelia (green) and South Karelia (yellow) regions, border of the historical province of Karelia in red

Karelia (Finnish: Karjala: Swedish: Karelen) is a historical province of Finland, consisting of the modern-day Finnish regions of South Karelia and North Karelia plus the historical regions of Ladoga Karelia and the Karelian Isthmus, which are now in Russia. Historical Karelia also extends to the regions of Kymenlaakso (east of the River Kymi), North Savo (Kaavi, Rautavaara and Säyneinen) and South Savo (Mäntyharju).

Karelia may also refer to the region as a whole, including the portion of Karelia within Russia. The term "Finnish Karelia" refers specifically to the historical Finnish province, while East Karelia or "Russian Karelia" refers to the portion of Karelia within Russia. Finland ceded a portion of Finnish Karelia to the Soviet Union after the Winter War of 1939–40. More than 400,000 evacuees from the ceded territories re-settled in various parts of Finland. Finnish Karelians include the present-day inhabitants of South Karelia and North Karelia, as well as the still-surviving evacuees from the ceded territories.

Finnish Karelia historically came under western influence, religiously and politically, and was separate from East Karelia, which was dominated by the Novgorod Republic and its many successor states from the Middle Ages onwards.

== History ==
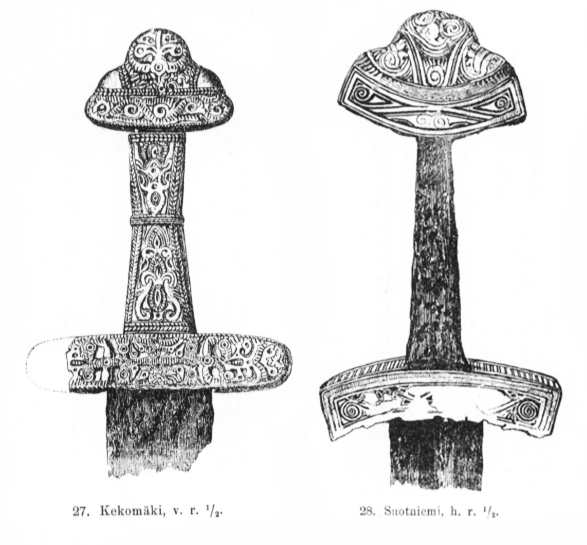
Drawing of Karelian Iron Age sword hilts by Theodor Schwindt made in 1893, which he had excavated earlier in Käkisalmi

First indications of human settlement in Karelia are from the Mesolithic period. The oldest find from the area is the over 9000 years old Antrea Net which is a fishing net of willow bast. The number of finds from the area is lower towards the end of the Stone Age. Archeological finds from Karelia are relatively rare between the years 400–800. From the Merovingian period onwards finds from Karelia display a distinct features of West Finnish influences which has been interpreted to result at least partly from a colonisation. The mixing of western Finnish settlers with the local population led to the creation of the Karelian ethnic group.

Archeological evidence indicates that Karelian inhabitation was highest along the western shore of Lake Ladoga and the Karelian Isthmus, with multiple cemeteries and other archeological discoveries dating from AD 600 to AD 800. In South Karelia, the number of archeological discoveries from this time period is lower, though permanent inhabitation was nonetheless present. Lappee, South Karelia has been continuously inhabited for approximately 2,000 years. In North Karelia, only one archeological discovery from this time period has been found, dating to the eighth century. The considerably higher number of archeological discoveries in these regions from AD 800 to AD 1050 indicates that the Karelian population grew and expanded rapidly during this time.

At least 50 sites of Iron Age settlements and 40 hillforts are known from Karelia. According to archeological record and historical data most of the hillforts in Karelia were erected between 1100 and 1323. Particular Karelian culture including axes, brooches and ornamental culture flourished approximately between the years 1000–1400.

The River Kymi formed a boundary between the eastern and western cultural spheres by the beginning of the Bronze Age at the latest and is also said to be the boundary between the Tavastians and the Karelians during the Middle Ages. The 15th and 16th centuries saw the River Kymi become a more official border between the Tavastians and the Karelians, with Naulasaari (located in Mäntyharju) serving as the meeting point of the borders between the Häme Finns, Savonians, and Karelians.

During the 12th and 13th century, Karelians fought against Swedes and other Finnic tribes situated in western Finland, such as Tavastians and Finns proper. Karelians were listed as Novgorodian allies in the mid-12th century in Russian Chronicles. Historical records describe Karelians pillaging Sigtuna in Sweden in 1187 and making another expedition in 1257 which led Pope Alexander IV to call out a crusade against Karelians at the request of Valdemar, the king of Sweden. The Third Swedish crusade, led by the marshal Torgils Knutsson took place between 1293 and 1295. As a result of the crusade the western parts of Karelia fell under Swedish rule and the building of the Castle of Viborg on the site of a destroyed Karelian fort started. According to the Eric's Chronicle invading Swedes conquered 14 hundreds from Karelians during the crusade.

Hostilities between Novgorod and the kingdom of Sweden continued in 1300 when a Swedish force attacked the mouth of the River Neva and built a fort near the current location of Saint Petersburg. The fort was destroyed the following year by the Novgorodians. Indecisive fighting in 1321 and 1322 led to negotiations and peace by the Treaty of Nöteborg which for the first time decided the border between Sweden and Novgorod. Sweden got territory around Viborg, the western Karelian Isthmus and South Karelia; and Novgorod got the eastern Karelian Isthmus, Ingria, Ladoga Karelia, North Karelia and East Karelia.

In 1617, Sweden seized Kexholm County (eastern Karelian Isthmus, Ladoga Karelia, and North Karelia) from Russia. In 1634 Savo and old Swedish Karelia were incorporated in the Viborg and Nyslott County. After the Treaty of Nystad in 1721 eastern parts of the Viborg and Nyslott County and the Kexholm County were ceded to Russia. The rest of these counties were incorporated into the Kymmenegård and Nyslott County. The southeastern part of this county was also ceded to Russia in the Treaty of Åbo of 1743. After the conquest in 1809 of the rest of Finland, Russia's 18th century gains, called "Old Finland", were in 1812 joined to the Grand Duchy of Finland as a gesture of good will (see Viipuri Province).

A large part of Finnish Karelia was ceded by Finland to the Soviet Union in 1940 after the Soviet aggression known as the Winter War, when the new border was established close to that of 1721. During the Continuation War of 1941–44, most of the ceded area was recaptured by Finland, but in 1944 was taken over again by the Soviet Union. After the war, the remains of the Province of Viipuri were made into the Province of Kymi. In 1997 the province was incorporated within the Southern Finland Province.

Western Karelia, as a historical Province of Sweden, was religiously and politically distinct from the eastern parts that were under the Russian Orthodox Church.

== Regions within Finnish Karelia ==
Notable regions of Finnish Karelia:

- Viipuri Province (1812–1944)
- Kymenlaakso (1917–present)
- South Karelia (1917–present)
- North Karelia (1917–present)

== Culture ==
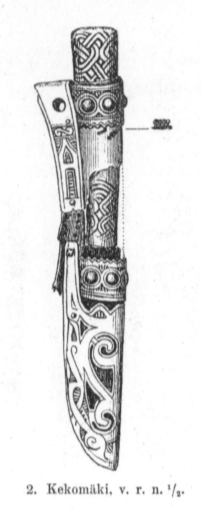
Drawing of a Karelian Iron Age knife with a sheath made by Theodor Schvindt in 1893 illustrating the one he excavated in Käkisalmi, Karelia

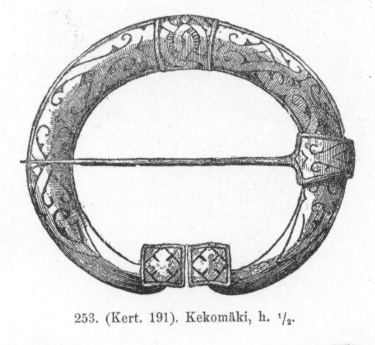
Drawing of a Karelian Iron Age silver penannular brooch by Theodor Schvindt in 1893

The inhabitants of Karelian provinces historically belonging to Finland are known as Karelians. Confusingly, the same name is used also of a closely related but distinct ethnic group living mostly in East Karelia, earlier also in some of the territories Finland ceded to the Soviet Union in 1944.

The traditional culture of "Ladoga-Karelia", or Finnish Karelia according to the pre-Winter War borders, was by and large similar to that of Eastern Karelia, or Russian Karelia. Karelians live, and did even more so before Stalinism and the Great Purges, also in vast areas east of Finland (in Eastern Karelia, not marked on the map above), where folklore, language and architecture during the 19th century was in the center of the Finns' interest (see Karelianism), representing a "purer" Finnish culture than that of Southern and Western Finland, which had been for thousands of years in more contact with (or "contaminated by") Germanic and Scandinavian culture, of which the Kalevala and Finnish Art Nouveau are expressions.

== People ==
- Martti Ahtisaari
- Anna Easteden
- Simo Häyhä, sniper during the Winter War.
- Ansa Ikonen
- Aarne Juutilainen
- Eino Luukkanen
- Veijo Meri
- Masa Niemi
- Aaro Pajari
- Lauri Törni, born in Viipuri, Törni was a soldier and winner of the Mannerheim Cross during the Continuation War, who later served with the German and American armies.
- Riitta Uosukainen
- Tatu Vanhanen
- Johannes Virolainen

== Names ==
Other than Finns, the historical province of Karelia also had Russian speakers living on the territory. The Russian name for the province is Karéliya (Карелия).

== Heraldry ==
The arms is crowned by a ducal coronet, though by Finnish tradition this more resembles a Swedish count's coronet. The symbolism of the coat of arms is supposed to represent how the region was fought over by Sweden and Russia for centuries. Blazon: "Gules, in center chief a crown or above two duelling arms, the dexter armored holding a sword and the sinister chain-mail armored with a scimitar, all argent except for hafts and gauntlet joint or.".
