= Second Swedish Crusade =

13th century Swedish military expedition to Finland

- Part of the Northern Crusades and the Swedish–Novgorodian Wars
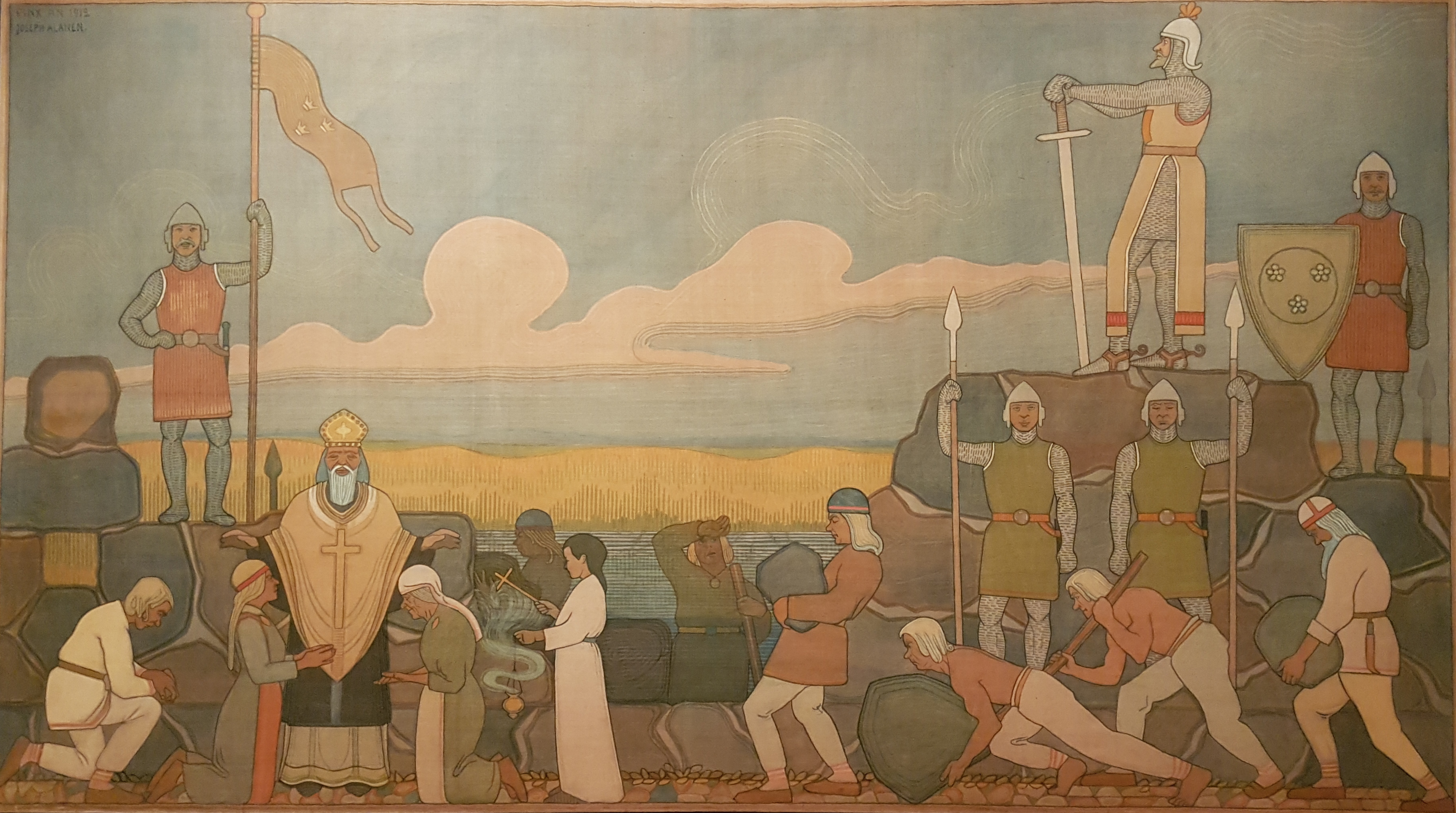
- Conquest of Häme by Joseph Alanen (1912)
Date	1238–1239 or c. 1249–1250
Location	Tavastia
Result	Swedish victory
Territorial changes	Tavastia becomes a part of Sweden

Belligerents
Sweden	Tavastians; Novgorod

Commanders and leaders
Erik Eriksson; Birger Jarl	Unknown

The Second Swedish Crusade was a military expedition by the Kingdom of Sweden into Tavastia (Häme) in southern Finland described by Erik's Chronicle. According to the chronicle, the Swedes defeated the pagan Tavastians under the leadership of Birger Jarl, and started building a castle in Tavastia.

The expedition has traditionally been dated to 1249–1250 based on the chronology of the chronicle. However, some researchers have suggested that the expedition instead took place already in 1238–1239, shortly after the Tavastian uprising and before the Battle of the Neva against the Novgorod Republic. The castle that the Swedes began constructing during the expedition has traditionally been identified as Häme Castle, but it may also have been the older Hakoinen Castle.

The Second Swedish Crusade consolidated and extended Swedish control over Finland.

== Background ==
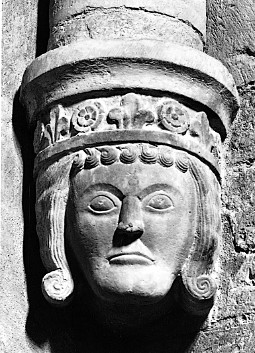
A sculpted head in Varnhem Church, identified as the likeness of Birger Jarl, leader of the Crusade

Sweden had held a foothold within Finland, specifically Finland Proper since the First Swedish Crusade. Swedish missionary attempts, possibly having been led by the bishop Thomas, were present within Tavastia in c. 1230. The Tavastian uprising from 1236–1237 led to a justification for the Swedes to invade Tavastia, with Pope Gregory IX calling the Swedes to attack them.

== Sources ==
=== Erik's Chronicle ===
All details of the crusade are from Erik's Chronicle, which is largely propagandist in nature, written a century after the events, amidst internal unrest and a war against Novgorod. The chronicle places the crusade between the Battle of Sparrsätra in 1247 and the death of King Erik Eriksson in 1250, and presents the pagan Tavastians (the hedna taffwesta) as the Swedes' opponents. According to the chronicle, the expedition was prepared in Sweden and then conducted over sea to a land on the coast, where the enemy was waiting.

The Chronicle also mentioned that a castle called taffwesta borg was established after the war. The Chronicle also linked the Crusade to a contest with the Orthodox Russians, making a point of the fact that the "Russian king" had now lost the conquered land.

=== Other sources ===
The so-called "Detmar Chronicle", originating from Lübeck around the year 1340, confirmed the expedition with a short note that Birger Jarl submitted Finland under Swedish rule. The "Lübeck Chronicle" states that in 1266, Finland become a part of the Kingdom of Sweden.

== Interpretations ==
Unlike the dubious First Swedish crusade, there seems to be little doubt that Sweden's effort to Christianize Finland reached a culmination in the middle of the 13th century. Still, many details, including the year and the exact nature, remain the subject of debate.

=== Nature of the Crusade ===
Although the chronicles attempted to paint the Crusade as a war of conquest, it was likely more of an unusually bloody phase in the ongoing process by which Finland was incorporated in the Swedish state. Sweden had a central government and a strong ideological force in the form of the Catholic church. The Finnish chieftains who joined gained power and prestige.

=== Dating controversy ===
The exact date of the crusade is not directly mentioned in Erik's Chronicle, though the event is placed before King Erik's death in 1250. In the 16th century, Mikael Agricola dated the crusade to 1248, while Paulus Juusten gave the year as 1249 in one edition of Chronicon episcoporum finlandensium (Bishop Chronicle). The latter date has become the traditional date ascribed to the crusade.

The dating to late 1240s has been challenged by later research. In 19th century, Norwegian historian Peter Andreas Munch pointed out that according to the Saga of Haakon Haakonarson—written 1264–1265 and considered more reliable than Erik's Chronicle—a Swedish-Norwegian crisis forced Birger Jarl to stay near the Norwegian border until it was resolved in the summer of 1249, leaving no time for an expedition to Finland that year. The saga also describes the election of the new king after King Erik's death. In contrast to the chronicle, the saga holds that Birger's arrival was crucial to secure his son's election. However, if the saga is to be believed, Birger could not have been in Finland at the time, as only eight days passed between the death and the election.

In 1946, Jarl Gallén pointed out that the chronicle contains obvious chronological mistakes and maintained that it cannot be used to date the crusade. He suggested that the Second Swedish Crusade could only have taken place in 1238–39, after the Tavastian uprising and following Pope Gregory IX's call to launch a crusade against the Tavastian pagans. Gallén's dating would also place the crusade before the unsuccessful expedition to the Neva, in which the Swedes were beaten by the Novgorodian prince Alexander Nevsky. Swedish historian Dick Harrison also finds the theory of an early crusade most probable, based on the papal letter, which would also make the war a properly sanctioned crusade, and the fact that Sweden was otherwise peaceful during that period.

In 1990, literary historian Gisela Nordstrandh studied Erik's Chronicle as a work of poetry. According to Nordstrandh, the author of the chronicle uses a literary technique that suggests chronological links between episodes which are known to be separated by distance of some years, and sometimes even inverts the chronology. Since some of these events are almost contemporary to the chronicle, they cannot be regarded as mistakes, but indicate that the author used a wide artistic freedom with regard to chronology.

The position that the crusade took place from 1247–1250 was defended in 1926 by Rolf Pipping, who claimed that Munch misinterpreted the saga. According to Pipping, Birger did not stay on the Norwegian border in summer, but rather in winter, possibly March. Russian historian Igor Pavlovich Shaskol'skii also supported the traditional dating, and added an argument based on Paavali Juusten's Bishop Chronicle, according to which Bishop Thomas fled his see in 1245 because of an attack by "Curones" and Russians, and according to Shaskol'skii this would have provided the reason for mounting the crusade in late 1240s. However, a contemporary papal bull shows that Thomas was forced to resign his office due to misconduct, not due to an attack.

According some Finnish historians, like Seppo Suvanto and Mauno Jokipii, the early dating is also problematic because Birger only became a jarl in 1248. However, Nordstrandh has pointed out that the author of Erik's Chronicle usually emphasizes the title jarl, but when describing the crusade Birger is only presented as the king's brother-in-law and a forman of the expedition. According to John H. Lind, no contemporary sources support the notion that only the jarl could act as a forman, and he finds it plausible that Birger could have been in command of the expedition even before he was appointed jarl.

Seppo Suvanto has also pointed out that no contemporary sources link Birger to the Neva campaign, which would in Gallén's dating have followed the crusade. The only Russian source to mention "Berger" as the leader of the Neva campaign is the apocryphal Testament of the Swedish King Magnus from the mid-14th century. John H. Lind has argued that in other cases the Testament contains historically accurate details, and cannot be refuted as a reliable source with respect to the Neva campaign.

=== Taffwesta borg ===
The Chronicle mentions a fortress that was built by the Swedes, taffwesta borg. This has traditionally been interpreted as Häme Castle (Swedish Tavastehus), but nowadays the nearby Hakoinen Castle is considered the more likely candidate. In 16th century sources, Hakoinen Castle is referred to as the "Old Häme Castle".

== Aftermath ==
=== Church reaction and reorganization ===
Probably in an effort to prevent other parties from getting involved in the conflict, Pope Innocent IV took Finland under his special protection in August 1249 but without mentioning Sweden in any way. The bishop of Finland, Thomas, probably a Dominican friar, had resigned already in 1245 and died three years later in a Dominican convent in Gotland. The seat being vacant, the diocese had probably been under the direct command of the papal legate, William of Modena, whose last orders to Finnish priests were given in June 1248.

Bero was eventually appointed as the new bishop in 1248/9, presumably soon after William's visit to Sweden for an important church meeting at Skänninge that ended on 1 March 1248. The so-called "Palmsköld booklet" from 1448 noted that it was Bero who gave the Finns' tax to the Swedish king. Bero came directly from the Swedish court, like his two successors. It seems that Swedish bishops also held all secular power in Finland until the 1280s, when the position of the Duke of Finland was established.

In 1249, the situation was also seen clear enough to establish the first monastery in Finland, a Dominican convent. The convent was next to the bishop's fortification in Koroinen until the end of the century.

=== Swedish succession ===
Erik's Chronicle tells of how, as an unexpected side effect, the expedition seems to have cost Birger the Swedish crown. When King Erik died in 1250, Birger was absent from Sweden. The Swedish lords, led by Joar Blå, selected Birger's underaged son Valdemar as the new king, instead of the powerful jarl himself.

=== Swedish rule in Finland ===
From 1249 onwards, sources generally regard Finland Proper and Tavastia as a part of Sweden. The Diocese of Finland proper is listed among the Swedish dioceses for the first time in 1253. In the Novgorod First Chronicle, Tavastians (yem) and Finns proper (sum) are mentioned on an expedition with Swedes (svei) in 1256. However, very little is known about the situation in Finland in the following decades. That is partly because Western Finland was now ruled from Turku and so most of the documents remained there. As the Novgorod forces burned the city in 1318 during the Swedish-Novgorodian Wars, very few of the documents about what had happened in the previous century remained. The last Swedish Crusade to Finland took place in 1293 against Karelians.

== See also ==
- Early Finnish wars
- First Swedish Crusade
- Third Swedish Crusade
- Northern Crusades
- Battle of Lihula
- Battle of the Neva

== Sources ==
- Harrison, Dick (2005). Gud vill det! (in Swedish). Ordfront. ISBN 91-7037-119-9.
- Tarkiainen, Kari (2008). Sveriges Österland (in Swedish). Atlantis. ISBN 978-91-7353-227-3.
