= Häme Castle =

- Hämeen linna (Finnish); Tavastehus slott (Swedish)
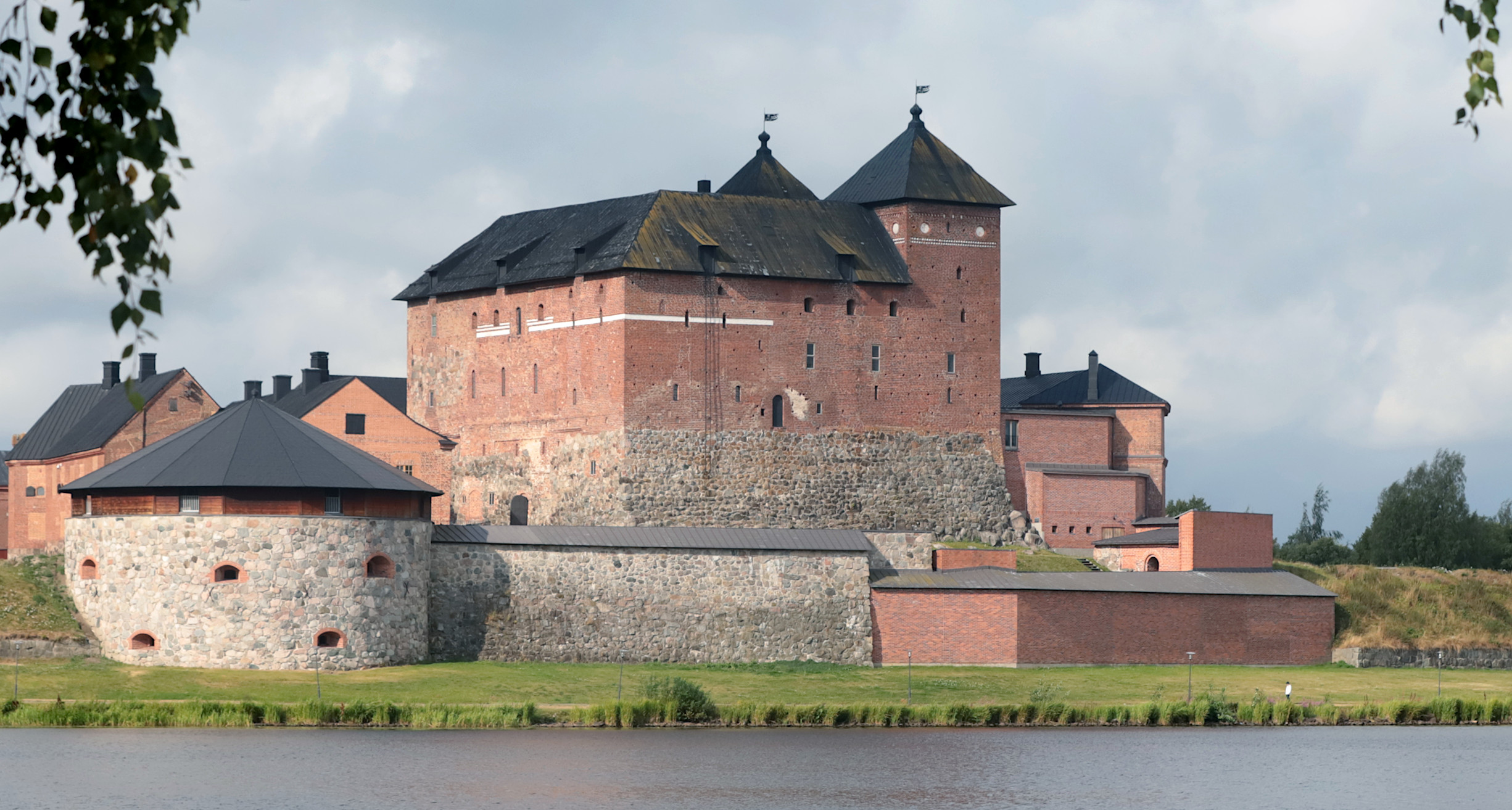
- Häme Castle today
- Interactive map of Häme Castle
- 61°00′14″N 24°27′29″E
- Type: Castle
- Etymology: Häme (Tavastia), referring to the region
- Location: Hämeenlinna, Kanta-Häme, Finland

History
- Built: 13th century
- Original use: Military fortress

Site notes
- Restored: 1953–1988
- Current use: Museum
- Owner: Finnish National Board of Antiquities
- Website: https://www.kansallismuseo.fi/en/haemeenlinna

Häme Castle or Tavastia Castle (Finnish: Hämeen linna, Swedish: Tavastehus slott) is a medieval castle in Kanta-Häme, Finland. It is located in Hämeenlinna, the city between Helsinki and Tampere.

Originally located on an island, the castle now sits on the coast of lake Vanajavesi. The castle consists of a central keep and surrounding curtain walls, enclosed by a moat. The keep originally had five turrets, but only two are apparent today. The curtain wall has a gatehouse, battlements, an octagonal brick corner turret, and a round gun turret. The lower tiers of the keep and curtain wall are of masoned granite and the upper tiers are red brickwork.

Although the exact date is disputed, the castle is generally considered to have been constructed in the 13th century. In addition to its status as a military fortress and home for Swedish nobility, the castle has seen use as a prison, and is currently a museum operated by the Finnish National Board of Antiquities. The castle is one of the main tourist attractions of southern Finland, being the centerpiece of the city and a popular venue for events, including Renaissance fairs.

== History ==
The castle's age is disputed. Traditionally, the construction of the castle has been connected to Birger Jarl's Second Swedish Crusade, which would date the castle in the mid-13th century. However, there are no archeological finds from the castle that can be firmly dated to a period earlier than the 1320s. An earlier fortification from the early 1300s only some 20 kilometres (12 mi) away in Hakoinen also contests Häme Castle's age, as only one castle ("Tauestahus") is listed in Häme in a royal document from 1308. Also, the Russian Novgorod First Chronicle only mentions one castle during their plundering of Häme in 1311, its description also matching with the castle in Hakoinen.

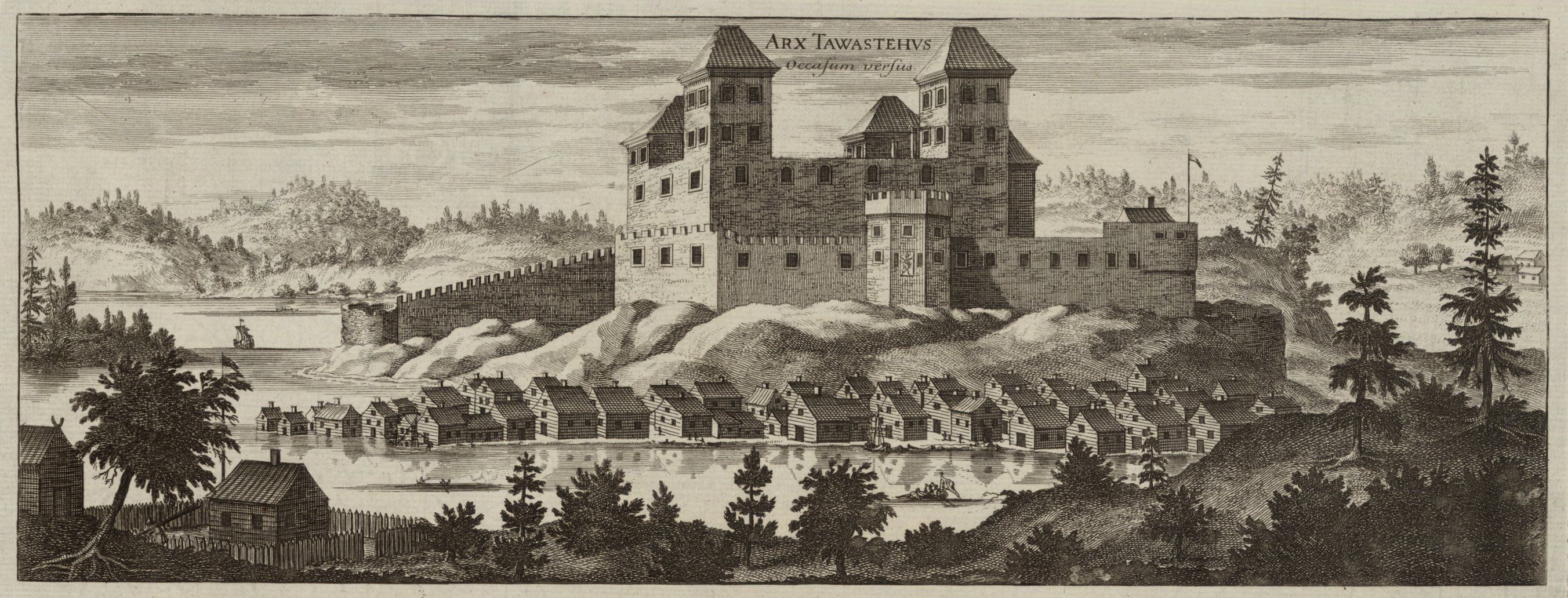
Häme Castle at the end of the 1650s

Some restoration was conducted in the early 1600s, and in 1639, the castle's nearby settlements gained official city status as Hämeenlinna.

The castle continued to be neglected by Swedish rule throughout the 17th and 18th centuries, as its military interests shifted to the southern Baltic Sea. Häme Castle was briefly ceded to the Russian army during the Great Northern War.

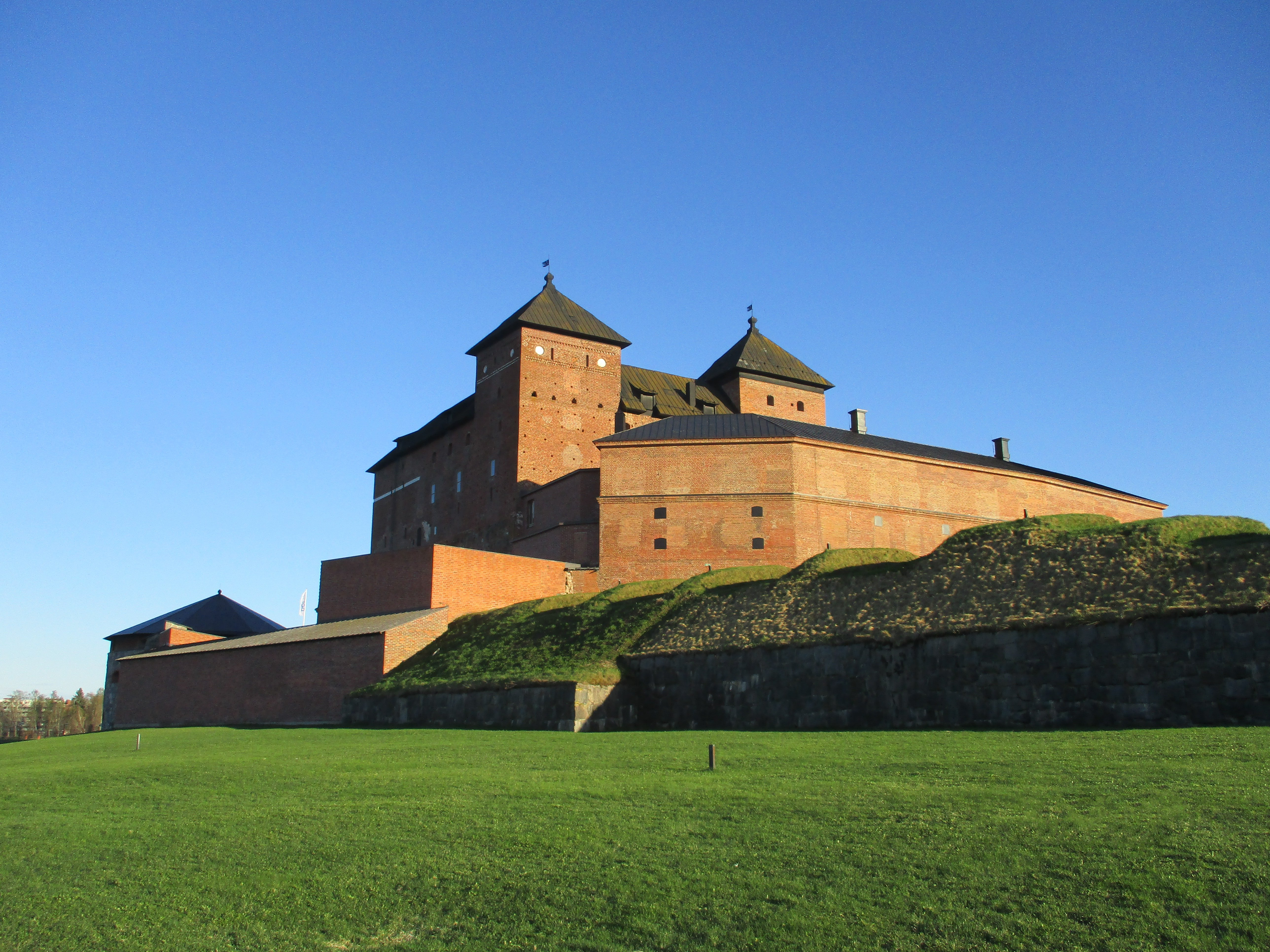
Häme Castle.

After the Finnish War, when Finland became the Grand Duchy of Finland under Russian rule, the castle was turned into a prison. It served as such until 1953, when massive restoration work started. The castle has been a public museum since 1979, the facilities of which can also be rented for private events.

== Gallery ==
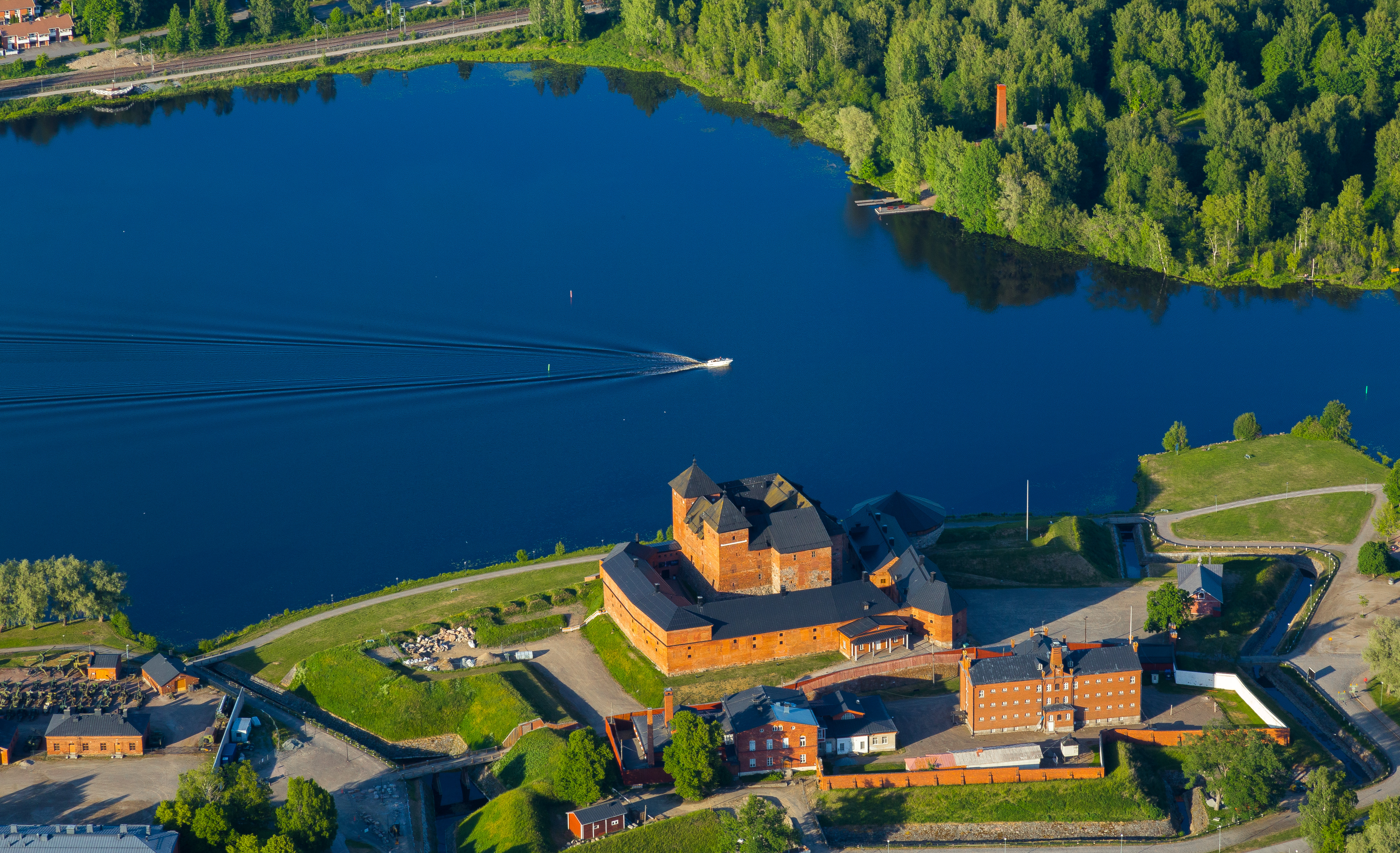
Häme Castle next to Vanajavesi.

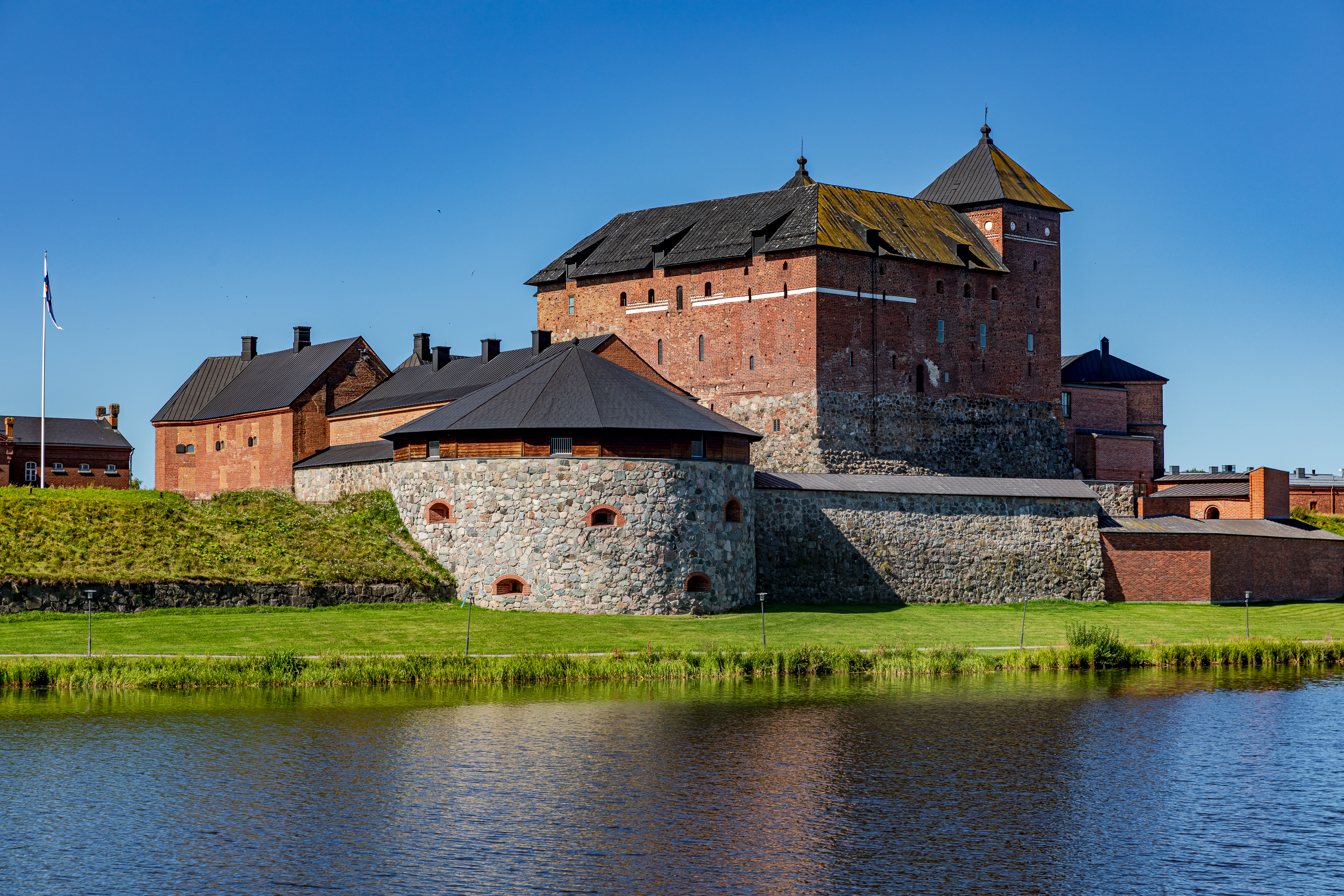
Häme Castle from the south east side.

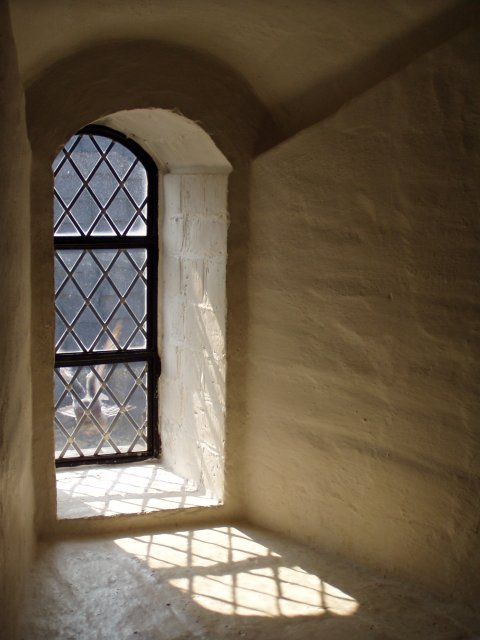
Window at the castle.

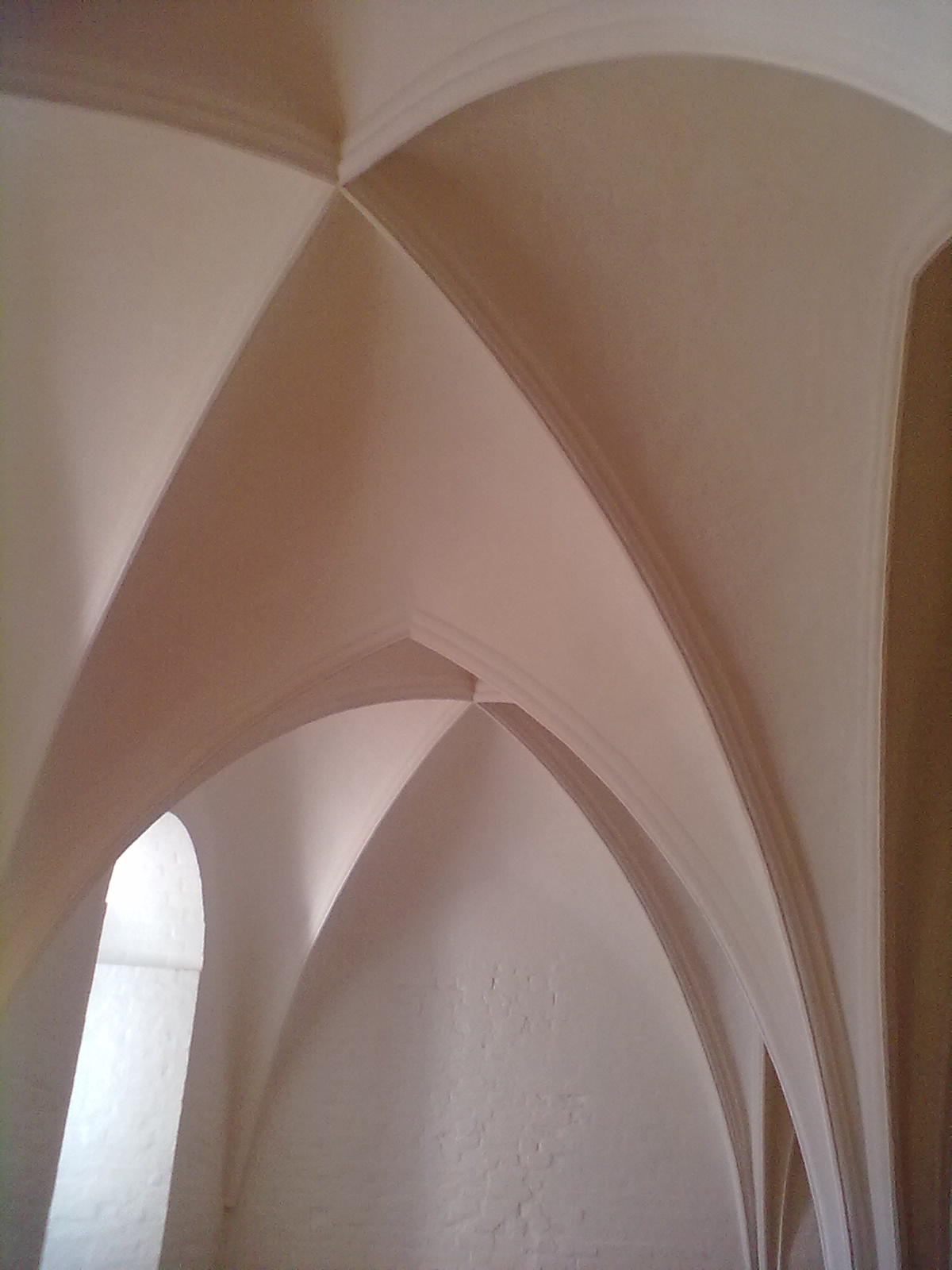
The roof of King's Hall.

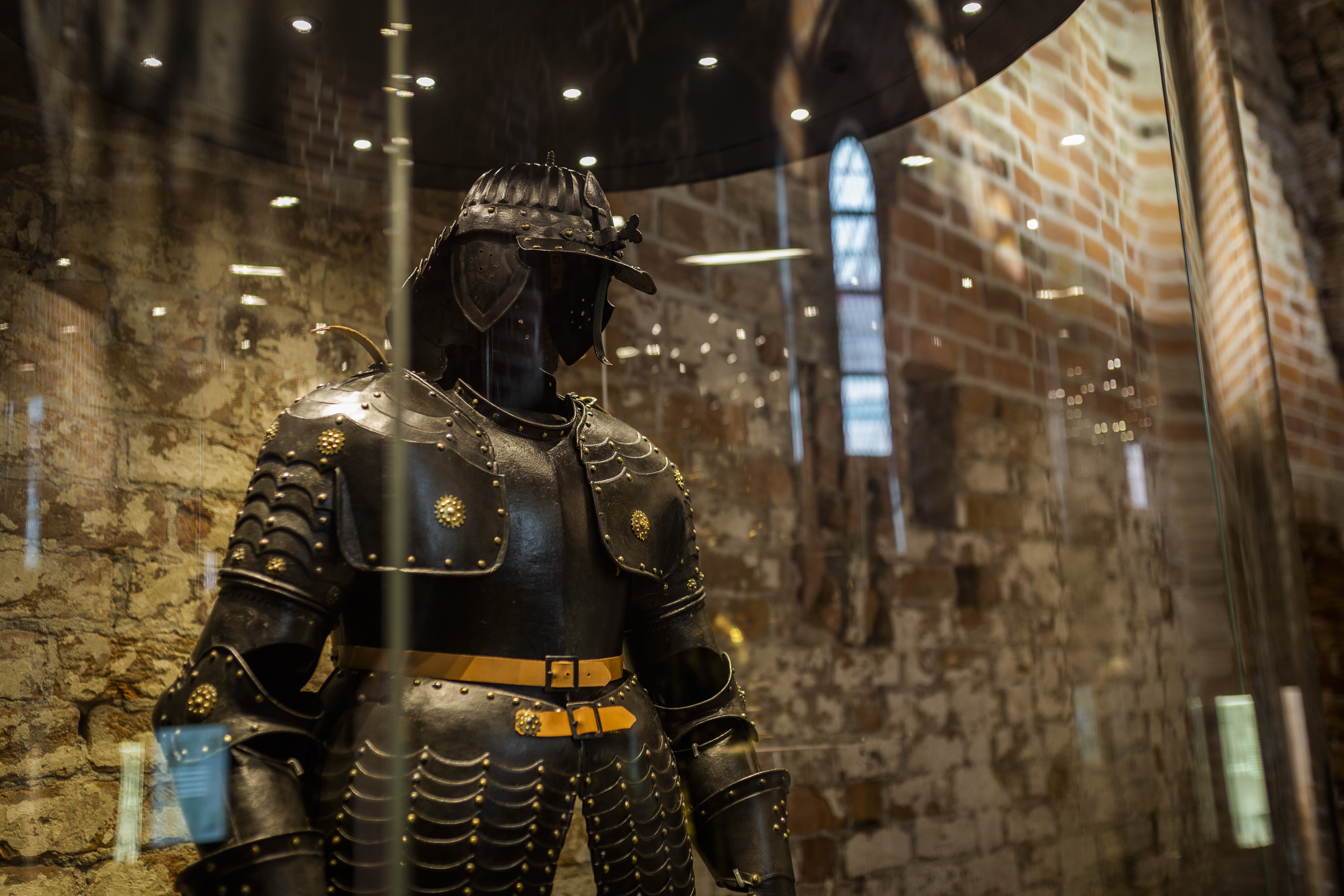
Knight's armour.

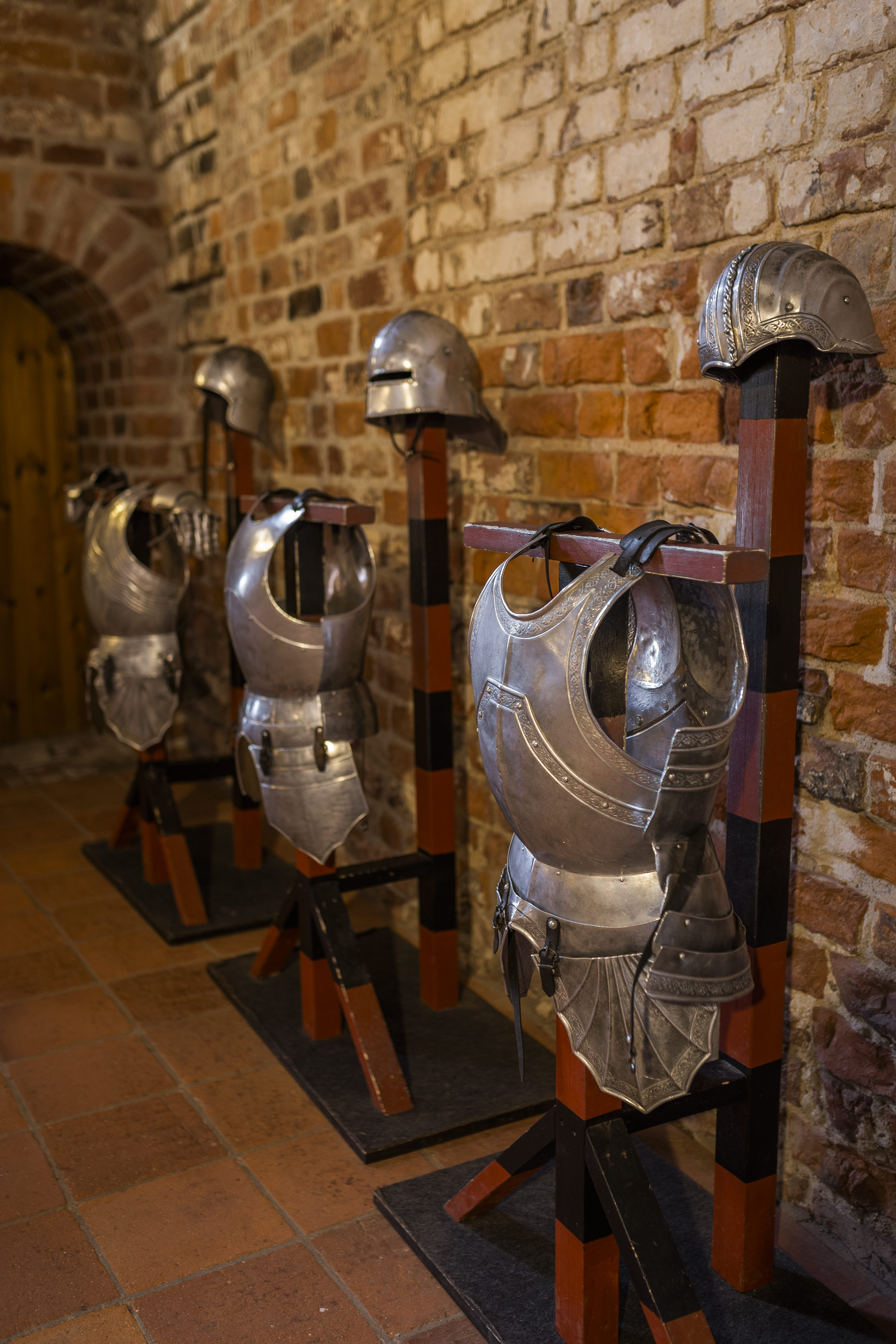
Guards armous.

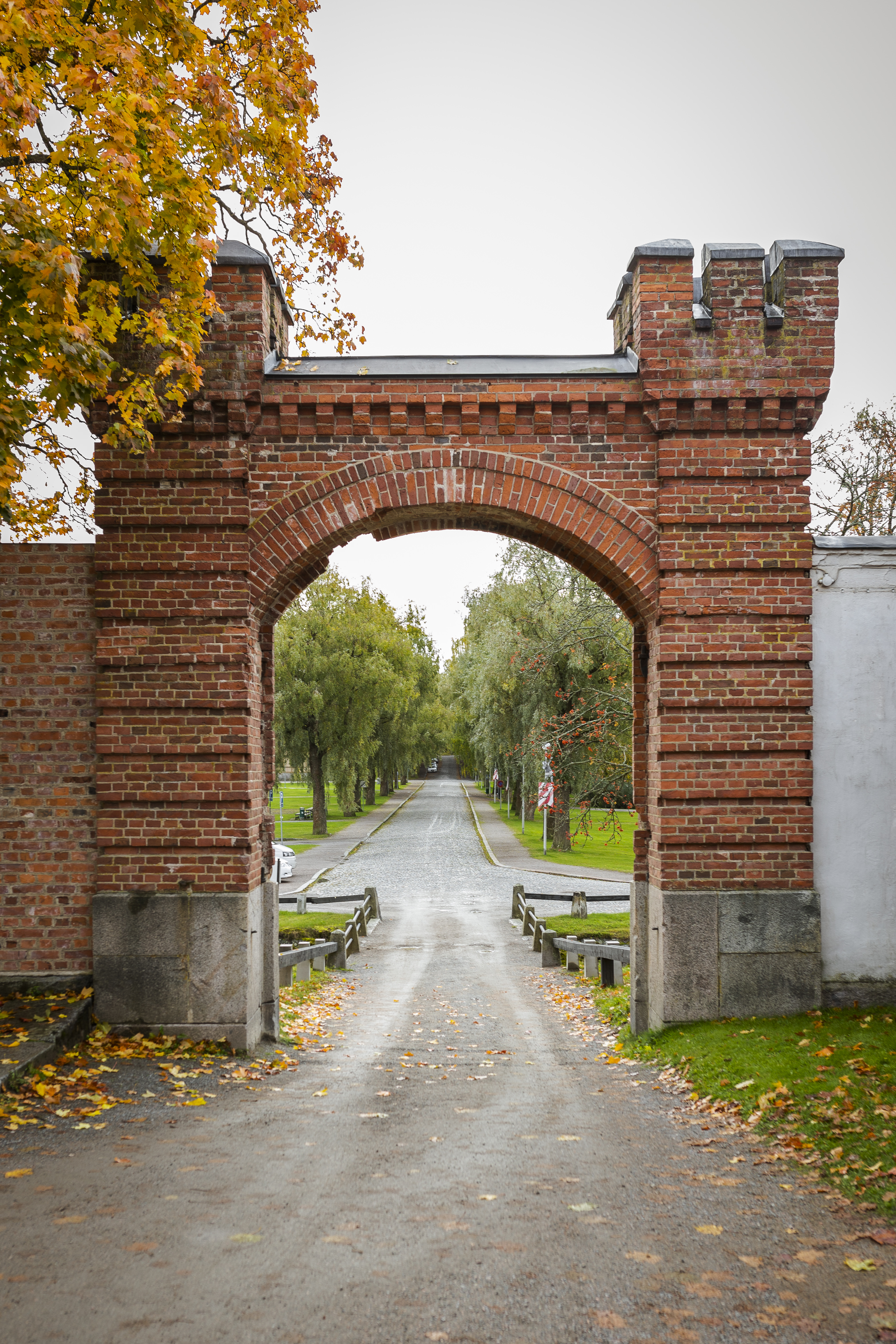
Gustav III's Gate.

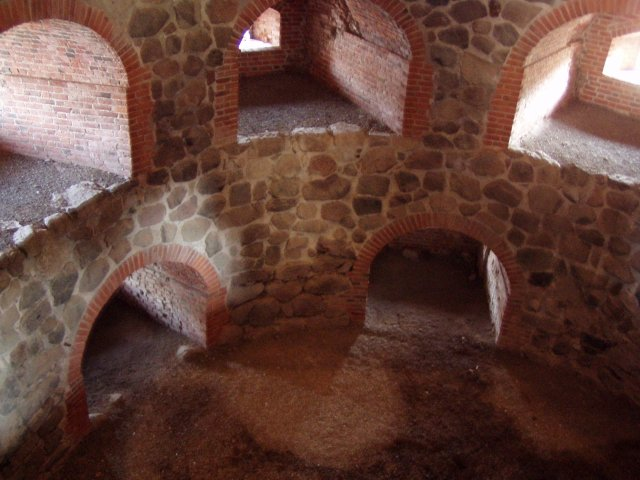
Bastion.

== See also ==
- Hämeenlinna
- Aulanko Castle
- Vyborg Castle
