= Aulanko Castle =

- Aulangonlinna (Finnish); Karlbergs slott (Swedish)
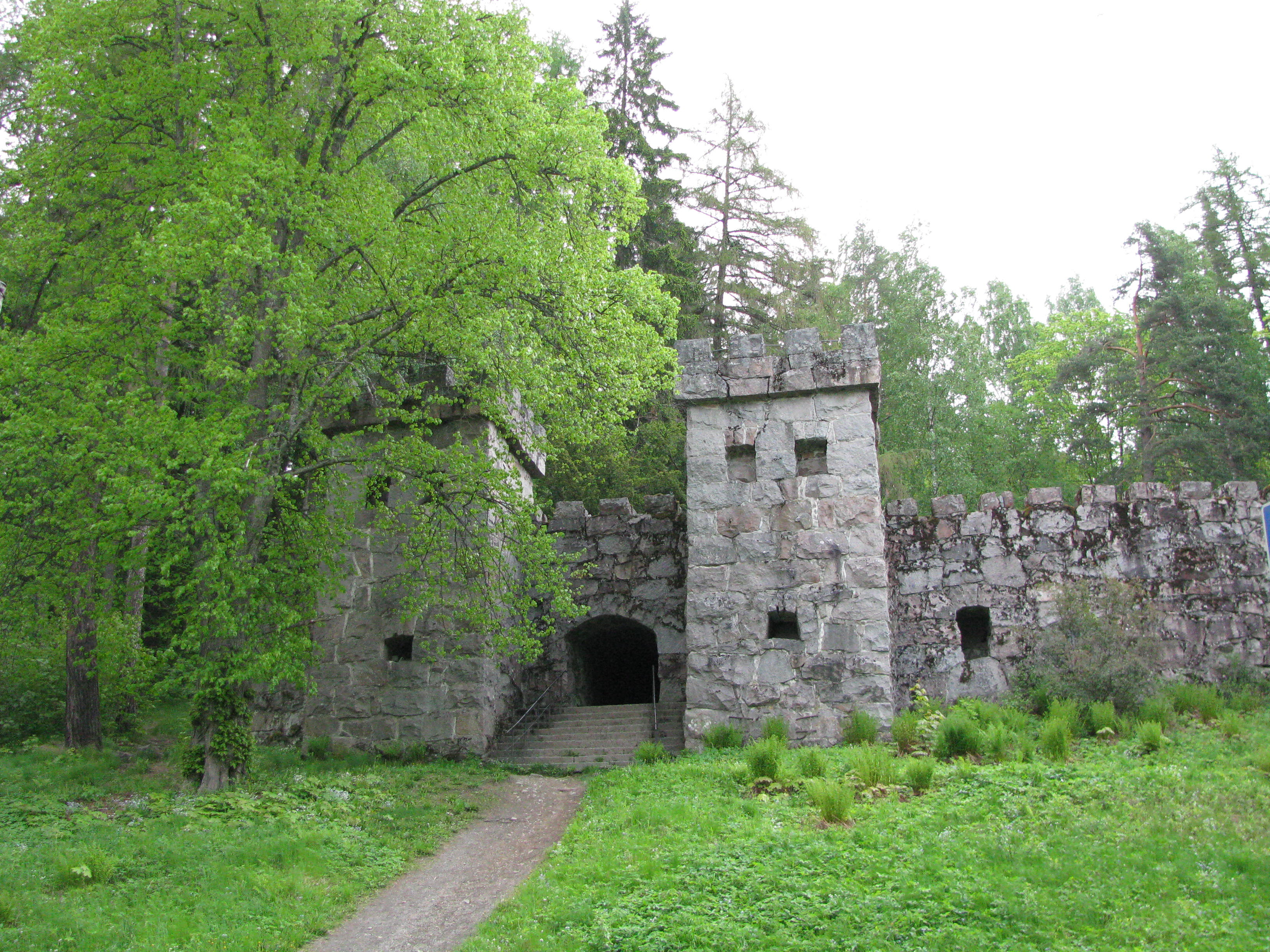
- Aulanko's Granite Castle is a modern construction
- Interactive map of Aulanko Castle
- 61°01′19″N 24°26′54″E
- Type: Hillfort, Folly
- Location: Aulanko, Hämeenlinna, Kanta-Häme, Finland

Site notes
- Website: https://www.nationalparks.fi/aulanko/sights

Aulanko Castle (Finnish: Aulangonlinna, Swedish: Karlbergs slott) is an ancient hillfort located in Hämeenlinna, Kanta-Häme, Finland.

An Iron Age residence and a cemetery are also located near the castle. It is not known when Aulanko Castle was built, but it was demolished in the 13th century. At the same time, the construction of Häme Castle began on the other side of Lake Vanajavesi.

Nowadays the Granite Castle functions as a summer theatre.

== See also ==
- Aulanko
- Hakoinen Castle
- Hämeenlinna
- Häme Castle
