= Tavastian uprising =

13th-century uprising in Swedish Finland

- Part of the Swedish–Novgorodian Wars
Date	Winter 1236–1237
Location	Tavastia
Result	Swedish victory

Belligerents
(History of Sweden (800–1521)) Kingdom of Sweden	Tavastians; Supported by: Novgorod Republic; Karelians

Commanders and leaders
(History of Sweden (800–1521)) Eric XI	Unknown

The Tavastian uprising, also sometimes called the Häme uprising, was an uprising by Tavastians in Tavastia, Finland in the winter of 1236–1237. The rebellion was against the Kingdom of Sweden and against the Catholic Church. The Tavastian rebels received aid from the Novgorod Republic, which sought to diminish Swedish influence in Finland in order to bolster its own position.

Pope Gregory IX described the event in a papal letter dated 9 December 1237 and addressed to Jarler, who was the Archbishop of Uppsala. He describes how the Tavastians returned to their pagan beliefs from Christianity and destroyed a Catholic church in Häme. He goes into detail describing other atrocities committed by the Tavastians. This has been seen as papal propaganda. Finally, he issued a call for a crusade against the rebels, and harsh measures were employed to end the uprising.

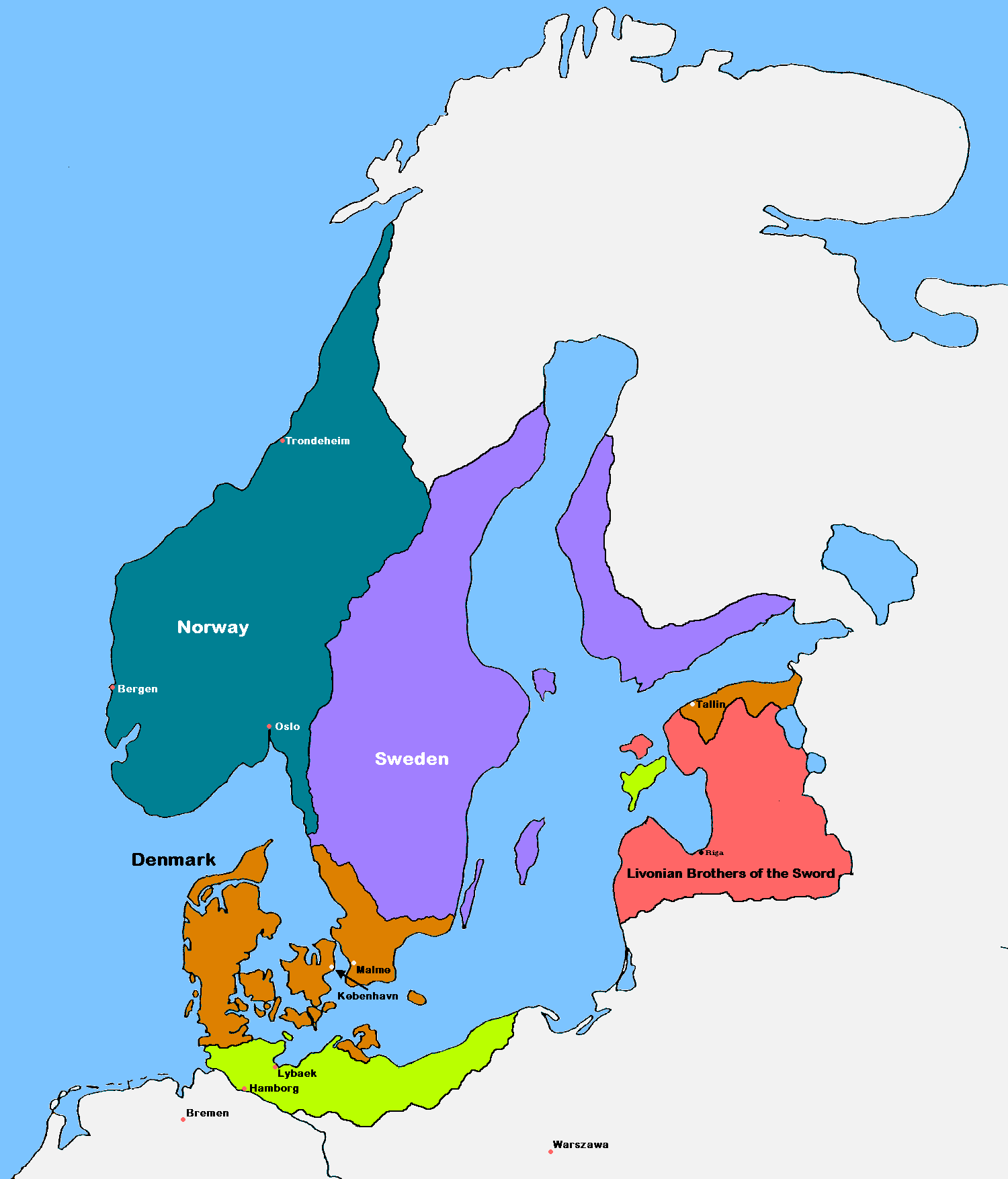
Rough territorial extent of Sweden (in purple) during the rebellion.

Due to the Mongol Invasion of Russia in 1237, support from the Novgorod Republic for the Tavastian rebels waned. Following the uprising, the Swedes held the Second Swedish Crusade against the Tavastians and used the Pope's message as further justification for the crusades.

== Papal letter ==
9 December 1237, Lateran. Pope Gregory IX to the Archbishop of Uppsala and his subordinate bishops: Bishop Gregory, servant of the servants of God, sends greetings and apostolic blessings to his venerable brothers, the Archbishop of Uppsala, and his subordinate bishops. The right hand of the Lord planted a vineyard, and He desired it to be irrigated with the blood of His Son, so that, nourished by the stream flowing from the side of Christ, it might produce wine whose sweetness would delight the high planter.

But alas, behold the sorrow, a wild boar destroys it, behold, a fierce beast tears it with its teeth. As it was revealed to us in your letter, those who are called the people of Häme, who had earlier, with great effort and zeal from you and your predecessors, been converted to the Catholic faith, are now, influenced by the nearby enemies of the Cross, turning back to the deception of their old errors. Thus, with the assistance of some savages, they completely devastated the newly planted congregation of God in Häme. They violently snatch away from little children, who have been enlightened by the light of Christ in baptism, this light and kill them. They forcibly extract the innards of adults, sacrifice them to evil spirits, and compel others to run around trees until they breathe their last breath. They blind some priests, cruelly mutilate their hands and other limbs, and burn the remaining survivors wrapped in straw as fuel for the fire. Thus, the Kingdom of Sweden is falling due to the cruelty of pagans, and the faith in it is easily being utterly destroyed unless it is promptly supported by the help of God and the apostolic see. Therefore, it is all the more necessary for men who fear God to rise up against such apostates and barbarians, who seek to crush the congregation of God with even greater harm, those who disturb the Catholic faith with abhorrent cruelty.

Therefore, by apostolic letter, we command your brotherhood to guide the Catholic men living in the mentioned kingdom and nearby islands with sound advice to take the sign of the cross upon themselves and to fight valiantly and forcefully against those apostates and barbarians. We note that the defense of faith to God is more pleasing the more valuable the faith is considered among other virtues of the spirit. For this reason, out of the mercy of Almighty God, and for those who take the sign of the cross for this cause, we grant such absolution and immunity that they would receive if they personally went to the Holy Land.

Given at the Lateran on 9 December in the eleventh year of our papacy.

== Works cited ==
- Sundberg, Ulf (1998). Medeltidens svenska krig (in Swedish) (1st ed.). Stockholm: Hjalmarson & Högberg Bokförlag. ISBN 9789189080263.
