= Aulanko Nature Reserve =

Nature reserve in Finland

Coordinates: 61.022°N 24.462°E

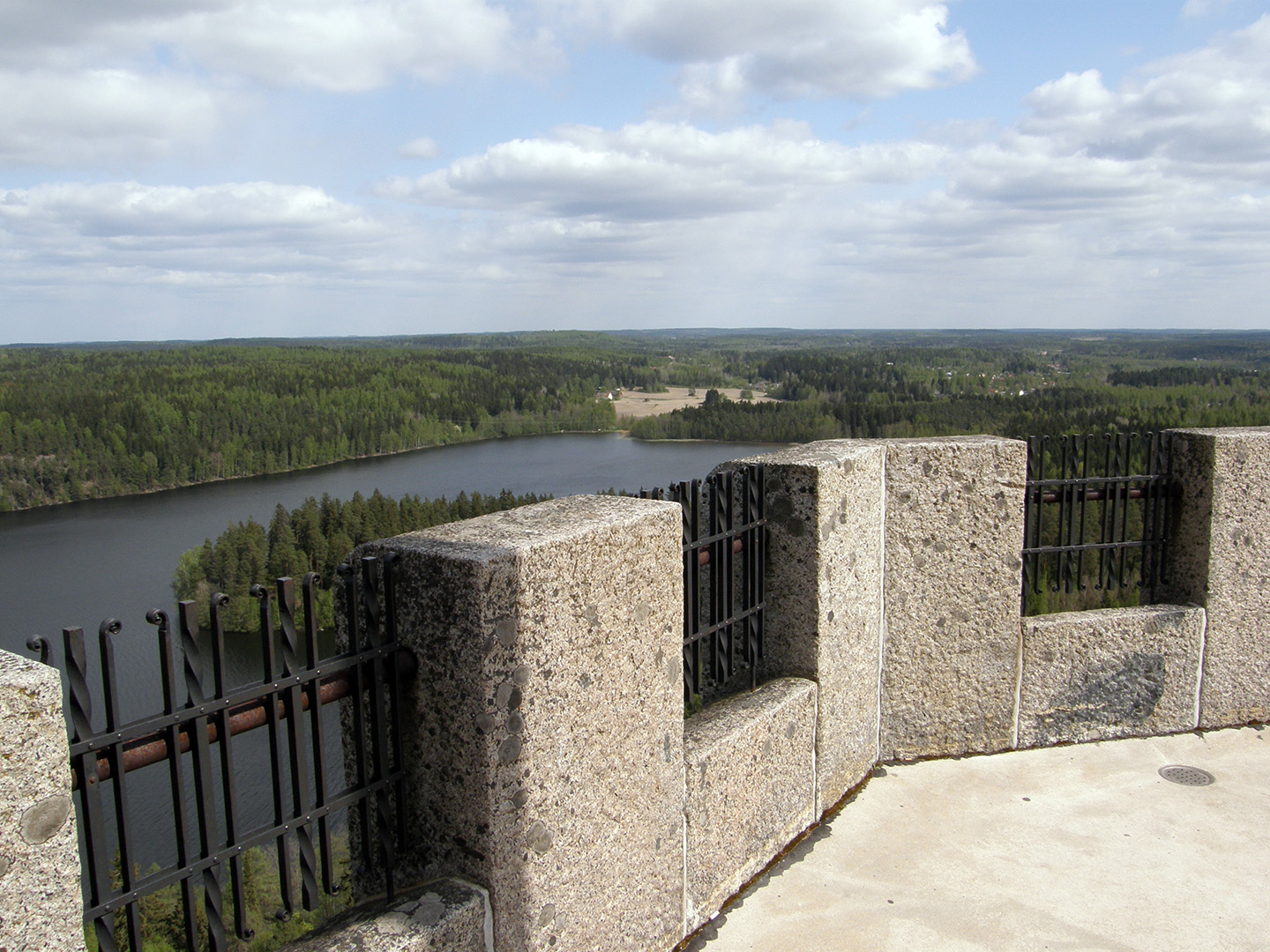
A nature reserve viewed from the Aulanko observation tower.

Aulanko Nature Reserve (Finnish: Aulangon luonnonsuojelualue) is a nature reserve in Finland near the municipality of Hämeenlinna. It is a part of Finland's National Urban Park policy introduced in the Land Use and Building Act in 1991.

== See also ==
- Aulanko
- Aulanko Castle
- Hämeenlinna
