= Hakoinen Castle =

Finnish castle ruin

Coordinates: 60°52′39″N 24°35′14″E

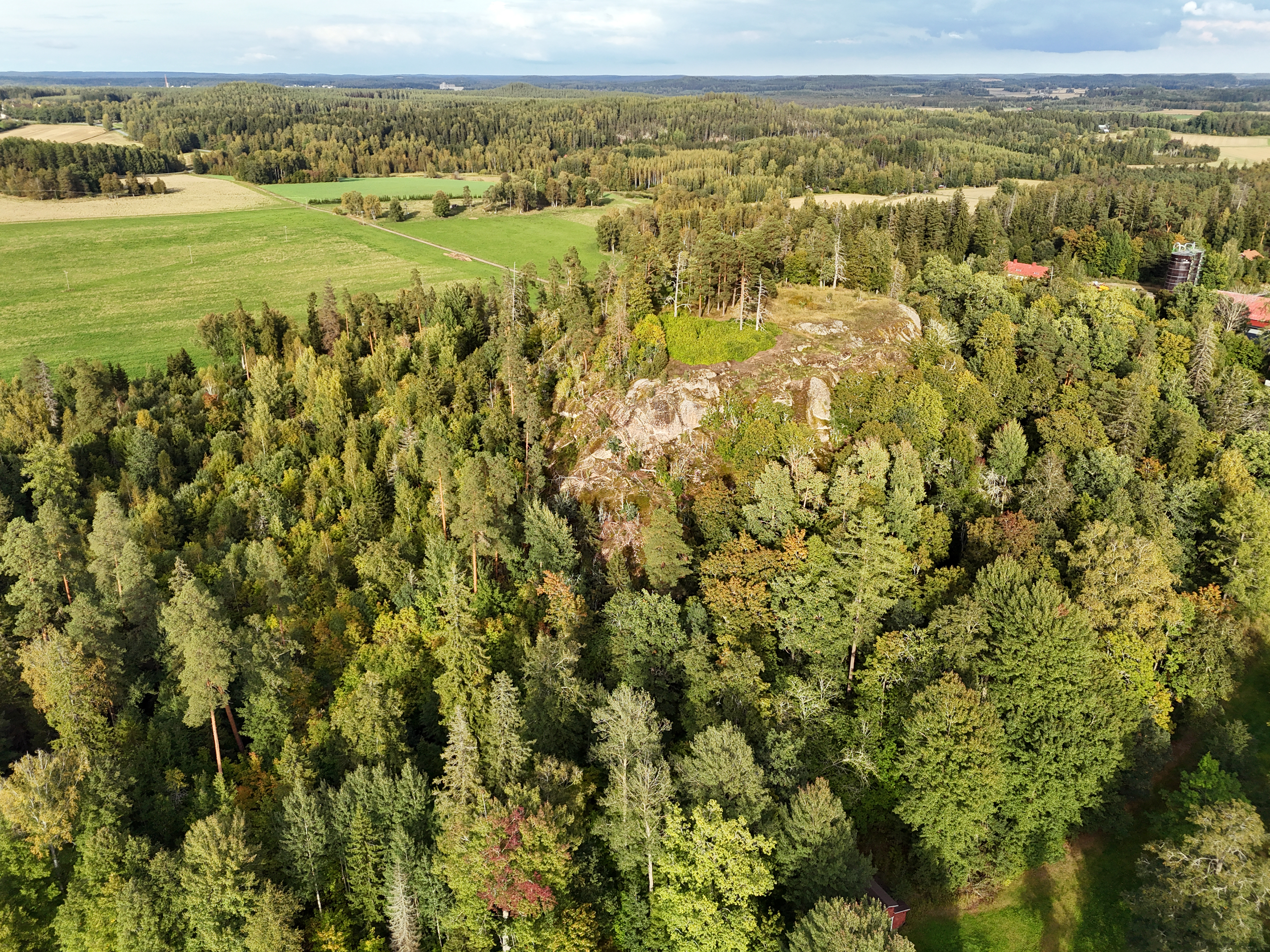
Hakoinen Castle viewed from the south in 2024

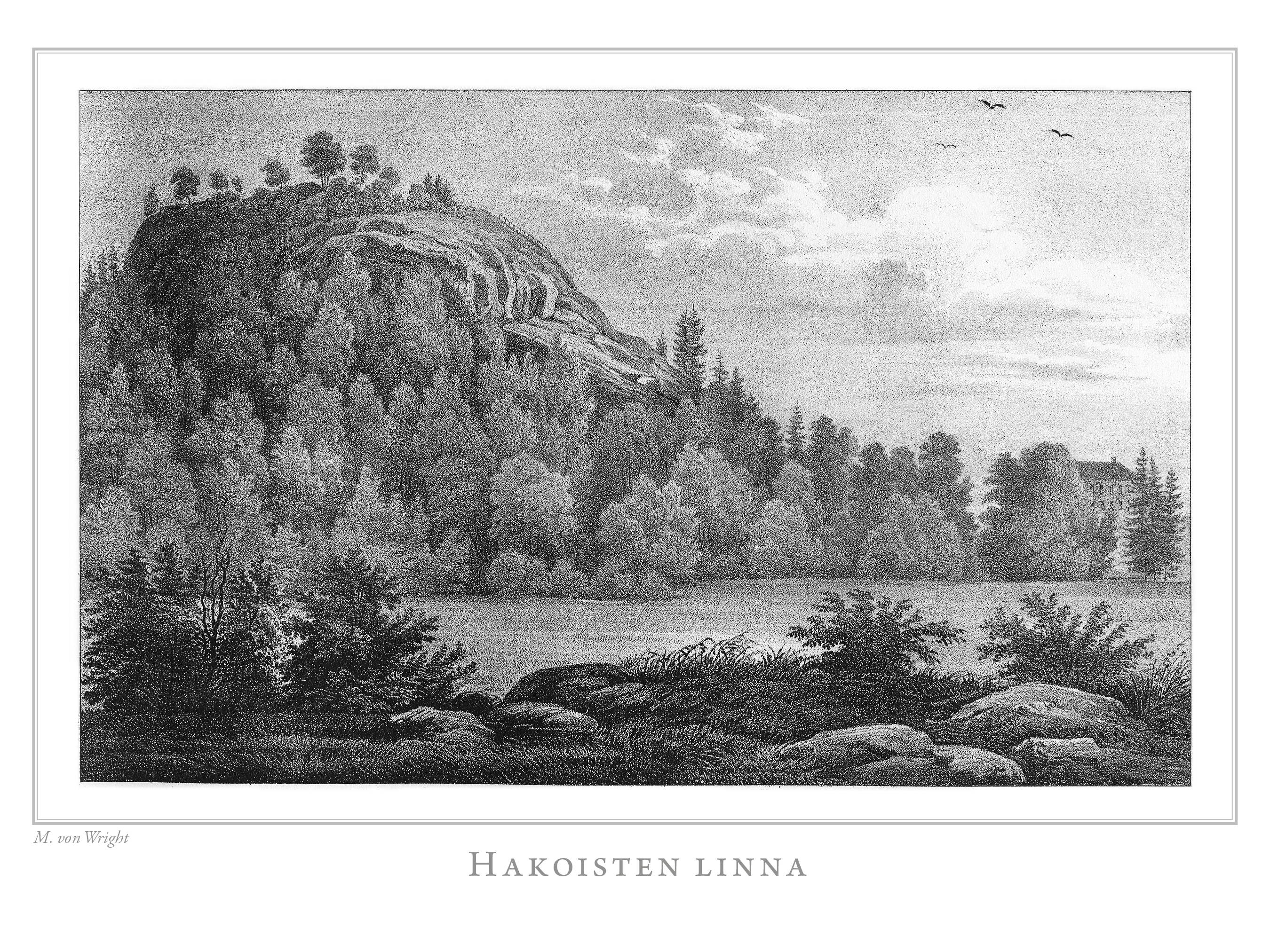
Illustration of Hakoinen castle in Finland framstäldt i teckningar edited by Zacharias Topelius and published 1845-1852.

Hakoinen Castle (Hakoisten linnavuori in Finnish) is the ruins of a fortification on a hill in Janakkala, Finland. Dated to the medieval period, the fortification was situated on a very steep-sided rock by Lake Kernaala (Kernaalanjärvi) in a manner reminiscent of the hill fort tradition. The top of the rock is 63 metres (207 ft) above the water level of the lake. Today very little remains of the castle. Equally little is known about its origins.

The name of the castle is not historical and was taken from the nearby Hakoinen mansion (Haga gård in Swedish). The original name is not known, but it may have been "Häme Castle" (Tavastehus in Swedish) which today is used for a later castle in the nearby town of Hämeenlinna. A source from 1625 calls Hakoinen as the "old Tauaste hus". "Tauestahus" Castle is first mentioned in sources in 1308.

The castle was probably built at the end of the 13th century or in the early 14th century. It has been speculated that Hakoinen might have been the fort that was attacked by invading Novgorodian forces in 1311 during the Swedish-Novgorodian Wars, as described in the Novgorod Chronicle:

"The men of Novgorod went in war over sea to the country of the Germans, against the Finnish (Yem) people -- And the Germans fell back into the citadel. For the place was very strong and firm, on a high rock, not having access from any side. And they sent with greeting, asking for peace, but the men of Novgorod did not grant peace, and they stood three days and three nights wasting the district."

Eventually Hakoinen was abandoned. Some activity seems to have continued there until the 1380s. The castle rock was later part of a large estate belonging to the bailiff of Häme Castle.

According to excavations, the castle was divided into two parts. Lower defensive constructions were mostly made of wood. Constructions on the rock were of bricks and rocks. The castle probably had one tower.

The site has only been excavated in the early 20th century.

== See also ==
- Motte-and-bailey castle
