= David's Rebellion =

Peasant revolt in Finland (1438–1439)

Date	Autumn 1438 – 9 January 1439
Location	Upper Satakunta, Finland, Kingdom of Sweden
Result	Swedish victory

Belligerents
Kalmar Union: Sweden	Peasants; Supported by Karl Knutsson Bonde (alleged)

Commanders and leaders
(Kalmar Union) Eric of Pomerania (Kalmar Union) Hans Kröpelin (Kalmar Union) Maunu II Tavast	David of Ania

Strength
Unknown	~75 total

Casualties and losses
~4 killed in action	Unknown

David's Rebellion (Finnish: Davidin/Daavidin kapina), also known as the Peasants' Revolt of 1438, was a peasant revolt in the Kingdom of Sweden that took place from 1438 to 1439 in Upper Satakunta, Finland. The uprising spread from Vesilahti to Nokia and was led by David of Ania, also called Crazy David of Upper Satakunta, a peasant leader who mobilized resistance in response to increasing tax burdens.

== Background ==
David was a wealthy peasant of the Heikkilä estate from Ania village in Vesilahti. He along with other members of the peasantry, had become frustrated with the increased tightening of taxation. The anger of the peasantry was only increased by the decline of the fur trade and the increased land grabbing by the nobility (rälssi) of economically important lands owned or controlled by the peasantry, such as fishing waters, mill sites, and various transport routes. Additionally the proportion of the tax burden payable in cash was lowered, and goods used for paying taxes were set to a lower value than the market price. Farm valuations were also adjusted to the farmers' disadvantage. This resulted in anger that was often directed at wealthy nobility and tax officials, such as Hans Kröpelin, who served as the Chief of the Turku Castle. It is also thought by some that David was involved as a political agent who was paid to stir up trouble by Karl Knutsson Bonde.

== Rebellion ==
The rebellion began in autumn 1438, and the rebellion's leader was chosen to be David, who was proclaimed the "peasant king" (bondekonung) by his fellow rebels. He and his rebels went on to Viikki manor (located in present-day Nokia) and killed four soldiers (huovi) in service of Jöns Turensson, a member of the Odygd family. The rebels also possibly went on to loot other manors in Pirkkala. Along with the rebellion in Upper Satakunta, there was another rebellion in Lammi in anger towards judge Olav Tavast, who are believed to have been in cooperation with David's rebellion.

The peasant revolt was tamed by Maunu II Tavast, who was the Bishop of Turku and by Hans Kröpelin by inviting the rebels to discuss tax reductions at Lempäälä. Ultimately the peasant rebels were given a lenient punishment of having some of their meadows handed over to the manor for their actions, and the peasants were pardoned and they were forced to promise to never rise up against the Swedish Crown again, on 9 January 1439. The rebels signed the following document in the Parish of Lempäälä, which was drawn up by Maunu II Tavast:

To all who hear or read this letter, we acknowledge and make it known that we, the residents of the parishes of Pirkkala, Kangasala, Lempäälä, Vesilahti, Kyrö, and the upper and lower Sastamala, have grievously transgressed against our sovereign, the Kingdom of Sweden, the Council of the Realm, and our leaders, in following that scoundrel and mischief-maker David and his brothers and others from his company, in their deceit and ruin, causing us to violate our lives, properties, both land and movable, according to the laws of the realm. However, the honorable lords and the Swedish councilors, for God's sake and due to the prayers of good men, have mercifully turned this eternal damnation and foolishness into grace, as is written herein: that we are to be loyal and obedient to our sovereign, the council of the realm, and our leader who holds Turku Castle, and to his officials, whom he appoints to that end, faithfully performing all that we are rightfully obligated to do for our king and sovereign, and never to rise against our sovereign, the kingdom, or our leader.

Should it happen, which God forbid, that we or any one of us should transgress against our sovereign, the kingdom, or our leader through treachery or any other form of betrayal, we bind ourselves to reopen this matter, which has been forgiven so graciously as written above, as if we had just then committed it, and it shall be rectified according to the laws without mercy. We have requested twelve men from each parish, whose names are listed (names follow), to guarantee on our behalf that the aforementioned provisions are to be observed without distortion, as written in the aforementioned clauses.

All the aforementioned twelve men from each parish acknowledge with hand and mouth, having pledged through our peace and Christian faith to our leader Hans Kröpelin in the presence of several good men, whose names are not mentioned here, on behalf of the gentry and the kingdom, to uphold all the aforementioned clauses without deviation in the future. As a greater assurance, for better and higher regard, we affix the seal of our province to the back of this letter, which is written and given in the year after the Nativity of Christ 1439 in the parish of Lempäälä, in the village of Kuokkala, on the Friday after Epiphany (January 9), and sealed on the eve of Saint Henrik (January 18) in Ylistaro, in the parish of Kokemäki, as your seal was not available before.

David fled to Tallinn after escaping from the custody of Hans Kröpelin to avoid a harsh punishment, however David's family was allowed to keep their farm in Ania.

== See also ==
- Cudgel War
