= Sweden-Finland =

Finnish historiographical term for 12th-19th century Sweden

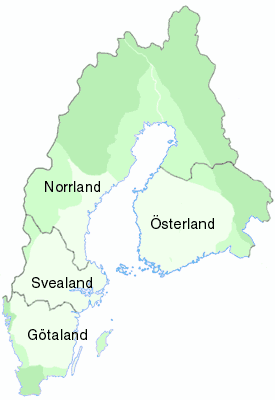
The historical lands of Sweden. (Different stages of expansion marked by shades. Borders as of year 1700.)

Sweden-Finland (Finnish: Ruotsi-Suomi; Swedish: Sverige-Finland) is a Finnish historiographical term referring to Sweden – with Finland under Swedish rule – from the twelfth century to the Napoleonic Wars.

== History ==
In 1809, the realm was split after the Finnish War. The eastern half came to constitute the autonomous Grand Duchy of Finland, in personal union with Imperial Russia.

The term was coined by national-minded Finnish historians, such as Jalmari Jaakkola, during the 1920s. Since then there has been an effort to drop it from professional historiography due to its perceived inaccuracy. In Finland, the term largely fell out of use by the late 1990s, but it gained increasing use in the Swedish historiography during the 2000s.

Although the term has didactic merits, for instance when used in conjunction with the term Denmark–Norway, it is misleading because Finland was an integrated part of the realm since the twelfth century, whereas Denmark and Norway were two sovereign kingdoms, which were united by personal union in 1380, but remained separate states until the sixteenth century.

The eastern and western regions of the realm became united mainly due to trade and settlements via Åland. A common misconception is that Finland was conquered by Sweden as a result of crusades. Crusades probably occurred, but had no decisive significance.

Until 1809, Finland was considered one of four Swedish lands. However, it was different from Götaland and Svealand, but not all of Norrland, in that Swedish was not the majority language in this part of the kingdom, except for areas along the coastline and amongst the nobility and the urban upper classes.

During the time of the Swedish Empire, Sweden-Finland was identical to Sweden proper; other overseas possessions constituted the dominions of Sweden. However, a conceptual distinction was sometimes made between Sweden and Finland already before 1809: for example, in certain sixteenth century documents, Gustav Vasa occasionally uses the phrases the cities of Sweden and Finland and the cities of Finland and the cities of Sweden, thus implying that the two entities are not identical. In this context, however, "Finland" usually referred to the provinces of Finland Proper and Satakunta, not to Tavastia or Karelia.

== See also ==
- Finland under Swedish rule
- History of Sweden
- History of Finland
- History of Sweden (1772–1809)
- Svenskfinland
- Swedish Empire
