= Karkku railway station =

Rail station in Sastamala, Finland

Karkku
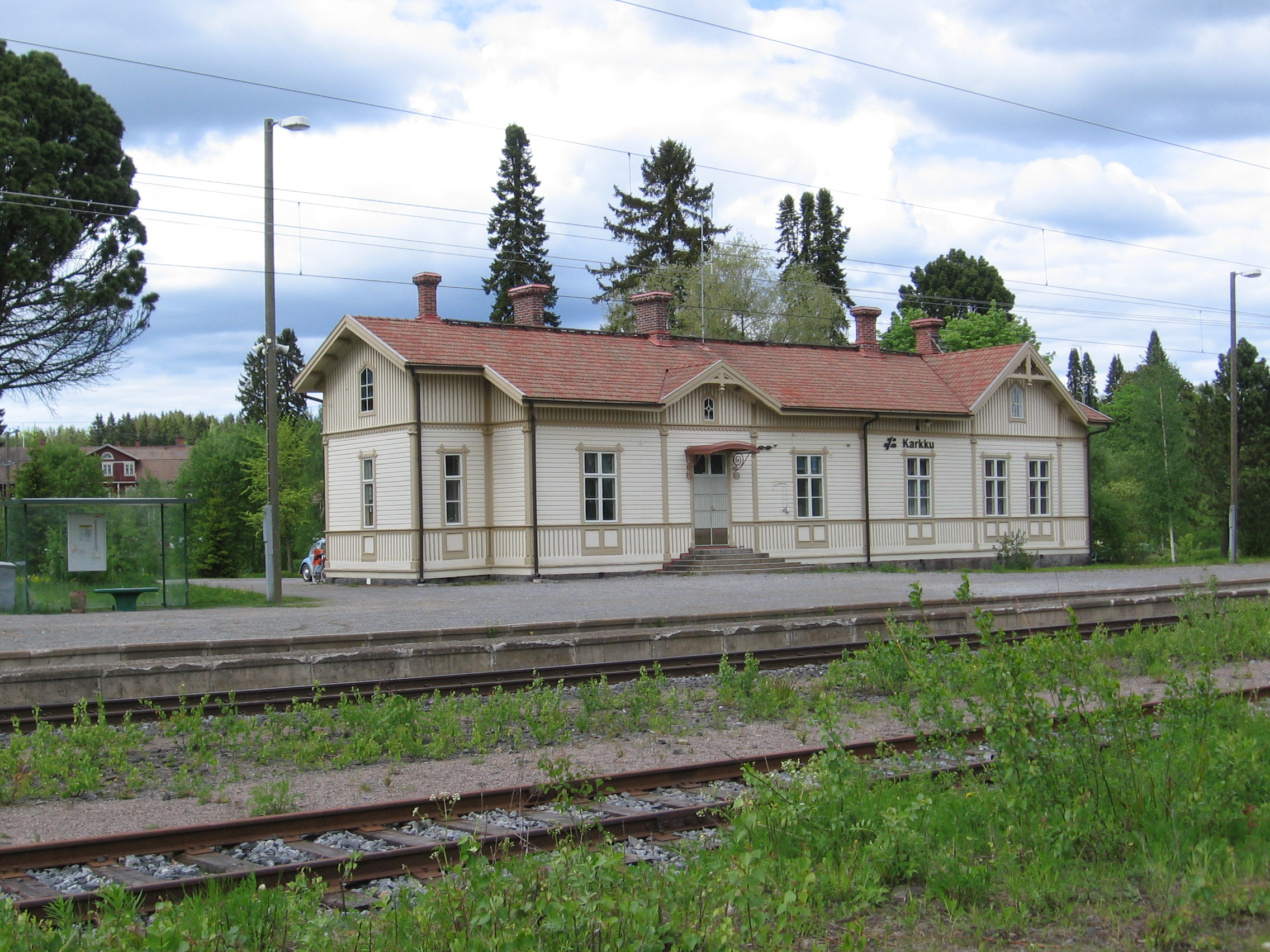
- The Karkku railway station as seen from the east. Behind the photographer's back is the Palviala boat harbour on the shore of Rautavesi. The red building on the left is the Wanha Harsu.

General information
- Location: Asemantie 17, 38100 Sastamala
- Coordinates: 61°26′37″N 23°02′57″E
- System: VR station
- Owner: Finnish Transport Agency
- Distance: Vammala 15 km Tampere 43 km Pori 92 km
- Tracks: 1 main track 2 side tracks

History
- Opened: 1895

Passengers
- 26,000 (2008)

Services
Preceding station	VR Group	Following station
Nokia towards Tampere	Tampere–Pori	Vammala towards Pori
Location

The Karkku railway station is located in the village of Karkku in the town of Sastamala, Finland. The station is located about 43 kilometres from the Tampere railway station and about 92 kilometres from the Pori railway station. Nowadays, the station is unstaffed, and the track is controlled remotely from Tampere.

== History ==
Karkku railway station was opened on the Tampere–Pori railway line opened in 1895, at the village of Palviala in the former Karkku municipality. The village surrounding the station soon became the centre of the Karkku municipality and some industry was also established near the station, such as a sawmill and a furniture factory.

The station building, built using the same designs originally made for the stations of the Oulu railway, was completed in 1895. The station building was expanded in 1904 with a cross gable designed by architect Bruno Granholm, which follows the original construction method of the station. The appearance of the building has remained almost original after both construction phases. The interior of the station building was completely renovated as well. A goods warehouse was built at the station in 1946.

During the last decades, the population of the station village has dropped significantly, dropping down to 600 by the turn of the millennium. The station is still used especially by the students of the nearby educational institution.

In 2013, the Karkku station area was renovated as part of the basic improvement contract for the railway between Lielahti–Kokemäki. New high edge platforms and light platform shelters were built at the station. In addition, the station's lighting and parking were improved.

== Services ==
The Karkku station is served by all long-distance trains that run between Tampere and Pori. The station has only one platform for the passenger trains that stop at the station. The station platform is 55 centimeters above the ground, and about 250 meters in length.
