= Kiikka =

- Former municipality
- Kiikan kunta Kiikka kommun
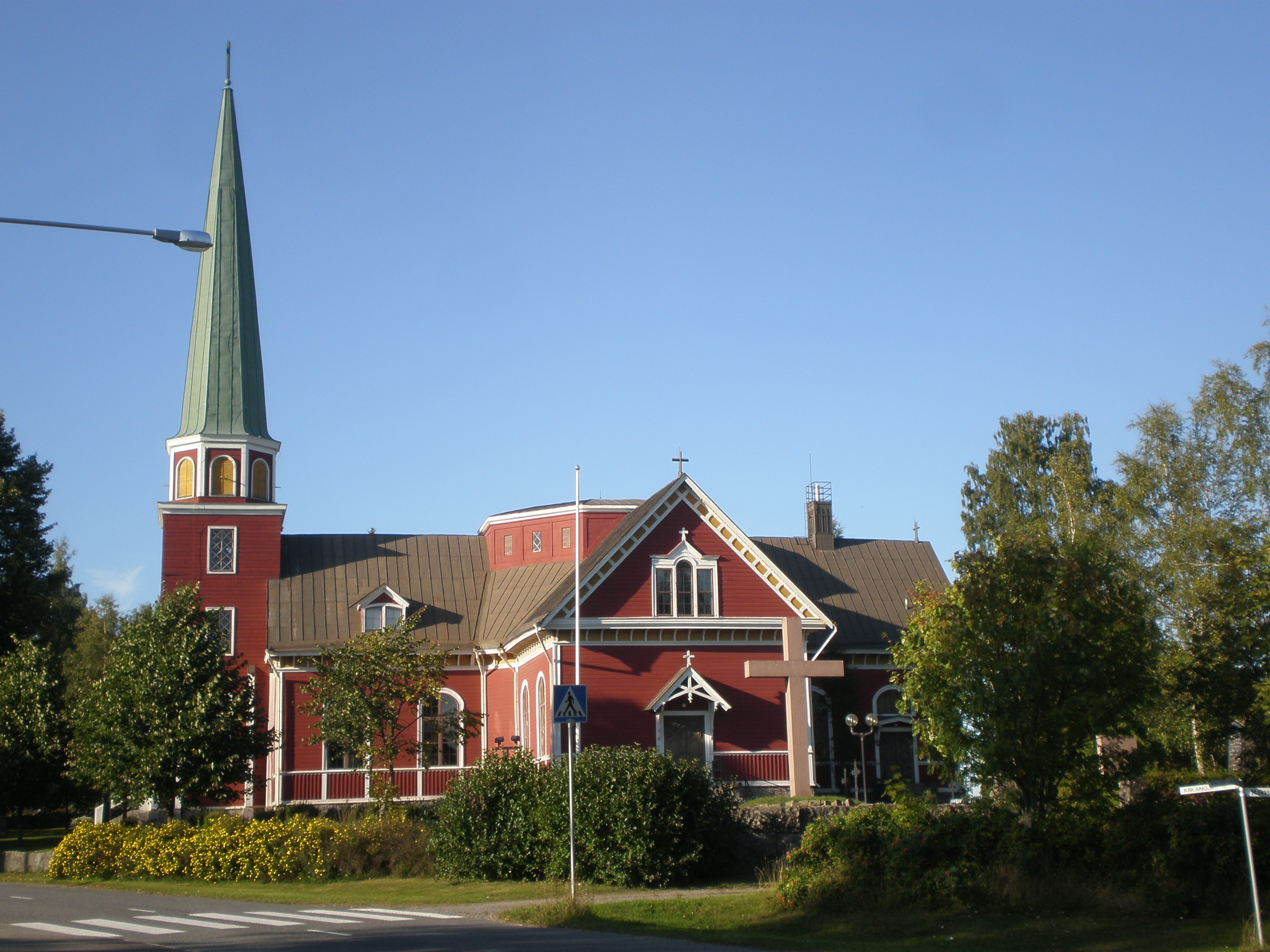
- Kiikka Church.

- Coat of arms
- Interactive map of Kiikka
- Coordinates: 61°19′14.8″N 022°46′31.4″E
- Country: Finland
- Region: Satakunta
- municipality: 1869
- Consolidated: 1981

Area
  - Land: 169.0 km^{2} (65.3 sq mi)

Population (1979)
  - Total: 2,698
  - Density: 15.96/km^{2} (41.35/sq mi)
- Time zone: UTC+2 (EET)
  - Summer (DST): UTC+3 (EEST)
- Climate: Dfc

Kiikka is a former municipality in the Pirkanmaa region of Finland. It was consolidated in 1981 with Keikyä into the municipality of Äetsä, which in turn was consolidated with Vammala and Mouhijärvi into the town of Sastamala in 2009. Kiikka is located by the river Kokemäenjoki, about 10 kilometres south of the Sastamala town center. The coat of arms for Kiikka was designed by T. Takala and Gustaf von Numers and was accepted in 1961.

== History ==
Kiikka was originally a part of Tyrvää, Turku and Pori Province, which was one of the 10 original sockens of the historical province of Satakunta. The parish of Kiikka was established in 1662, but the first church was built in the 15th century. The present Kiikka Church was completed in 1807. The church is made from wood. The church was repaired following architect C. J. von Heideken's plans during the years 1883−1884. The modern design was made by following architect Bertel Strömmer's plans for newer aesthetics for the church in the year 1937, but the changes were finally done in the year 1952. The altarpiece painted by Alexandra Såltin in the year 1884 represents the Transfiguration of Christ. The church organs are from the year 1907. The Kiikka railway station by the Tampere–Pori railway was opened in 1895 and closed in 1987.

Kiikka is the birthplace of the politician Tuure Junnila, the historian Reino Kero, the scientist Eino Kulonen and the poet Kaarlo Sarkia.
