= Keikyä =

- Former municipality
- Keikyän kunta Keikyä kommun
- Coat of arms

- Location of Keikyä in Finland
- Coordinates: 61.2717593°N 22.7025389°E
- Country: Finland
- Province: Turku and Pori Province
- Region: Pirkanmaa
- Merged into Äetsä: 1981
- Seat: Pehula

Area
  - Land: 66.0 km^{2} (25.5 sq mi)

Population (1980-12-31)
  - Total: 2,977

Keikyä is a former municipality of Finland in the former Turku and Pori Province, now in Pirkanmaa. Together with Kiikka, it formed the Äetsä municipality in 1981, which formed the Sastamala municipality with Vammala and Mouhijärvi in 2009.

Its seat was in Pehula, while the church was located in the village of Keikyä.

== Geography ==
Keikyä bordered Kiikka, Vammala, Huittinen and Kokemäki. Until 1969 it bordered Kauvatsa instead of Kokemäki and until 1973, Tyrvää instead of Vammala.

The municipality was divided into two sides by the river Kokemäenjoki.

== History ==
The territory of modern Sastamala contains the territories of eight former municipalities.

Keikyä was originally a part of the Huittinen parish. It was first mentioned as one of Huittinen's villages in 1487. It was also the center of the Keikyä fourth of Huittinen. The people of Keikyä have held hunting grounds near modern Ahlainen, as evidenced by the toponym Keikvesi.

Keikyä became a chapel community in 1684. The first proper church was built in 1830 as the initial chapel had become too small. The current church was built in 1912. The Finnish senate ordered Keikyä's separation from Huittinen in 1908, which came into effect in 1920.

Industrialization began in the late 19th century with the establishment of a wool spinnery, followed by a machine workshop, a tricot factory and dyeworks, collectively called Äetsän tehtaat (factories of Äetsä) located by the Äetsänkoski rapids. A chemical factory was established in the area in the 1930s, nowadays owned by Kemira.

The municipal center eventually moved from the village of Keikyä to the village of Pehula (also called Äetsä) as it was closer to the factories and a train station. Keikyä united with neighboring Kiikka in 1981 to form Äetsä, with its center in Pehula. In 2009, Äetsä united with Vammala and Mouhijärvi to form the town of Sastamala.

== Church ==
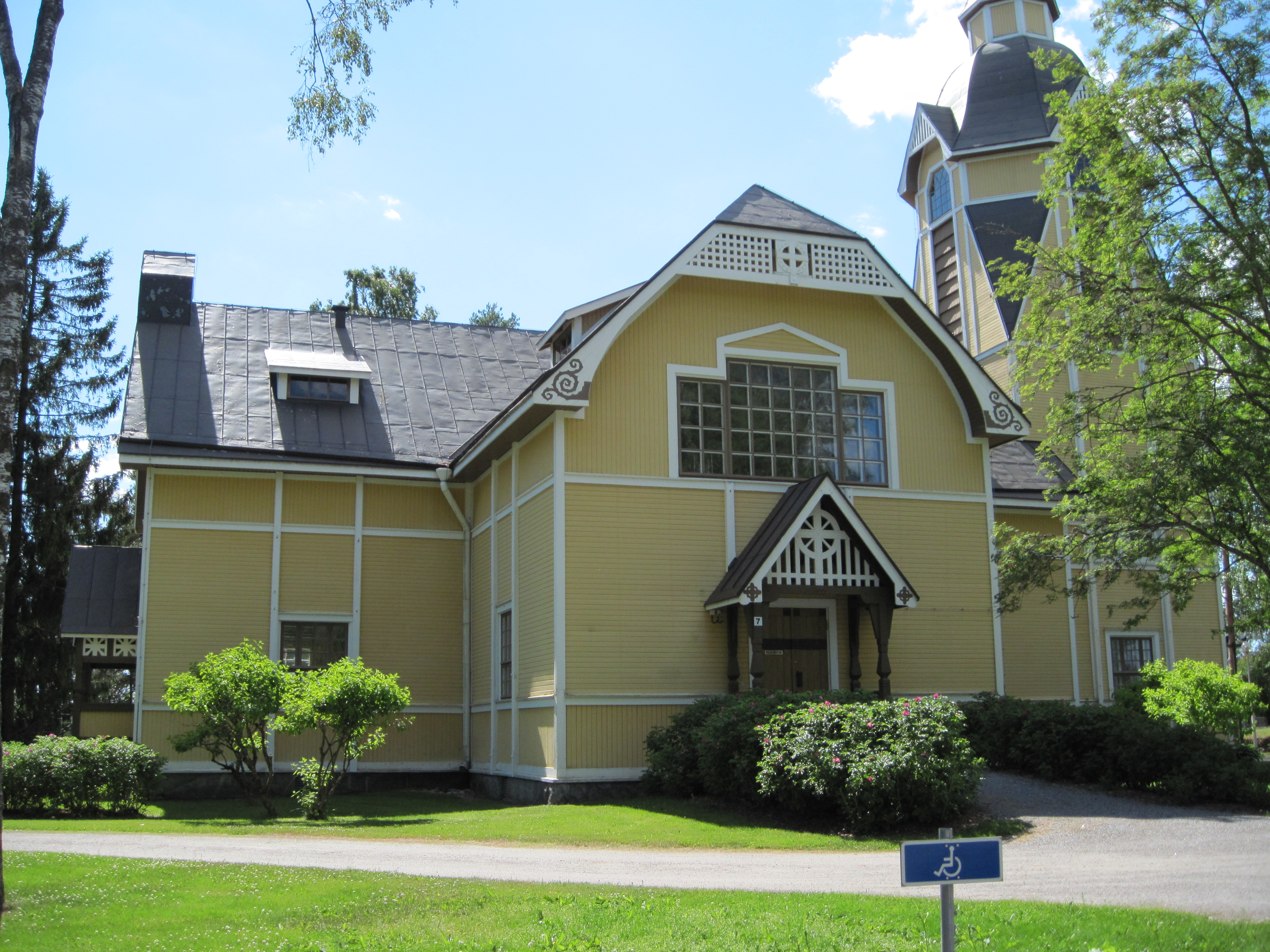

The current church of Keikyä was built in 1912, designed by Josef Stenbäck. Parts of the original church were used as materials. The altarpiece, made in 1753, depicts Simeon holding Baby Jesus.

== Services ==
Most of Keikyä's services are located in Pehula.

=== School ===
Pehula has a school for grades 1-6 (ala-aste). It had 131 students in 2022.
