= Karkku =

- Former municipality
- Karkun kunta Karkku kommun
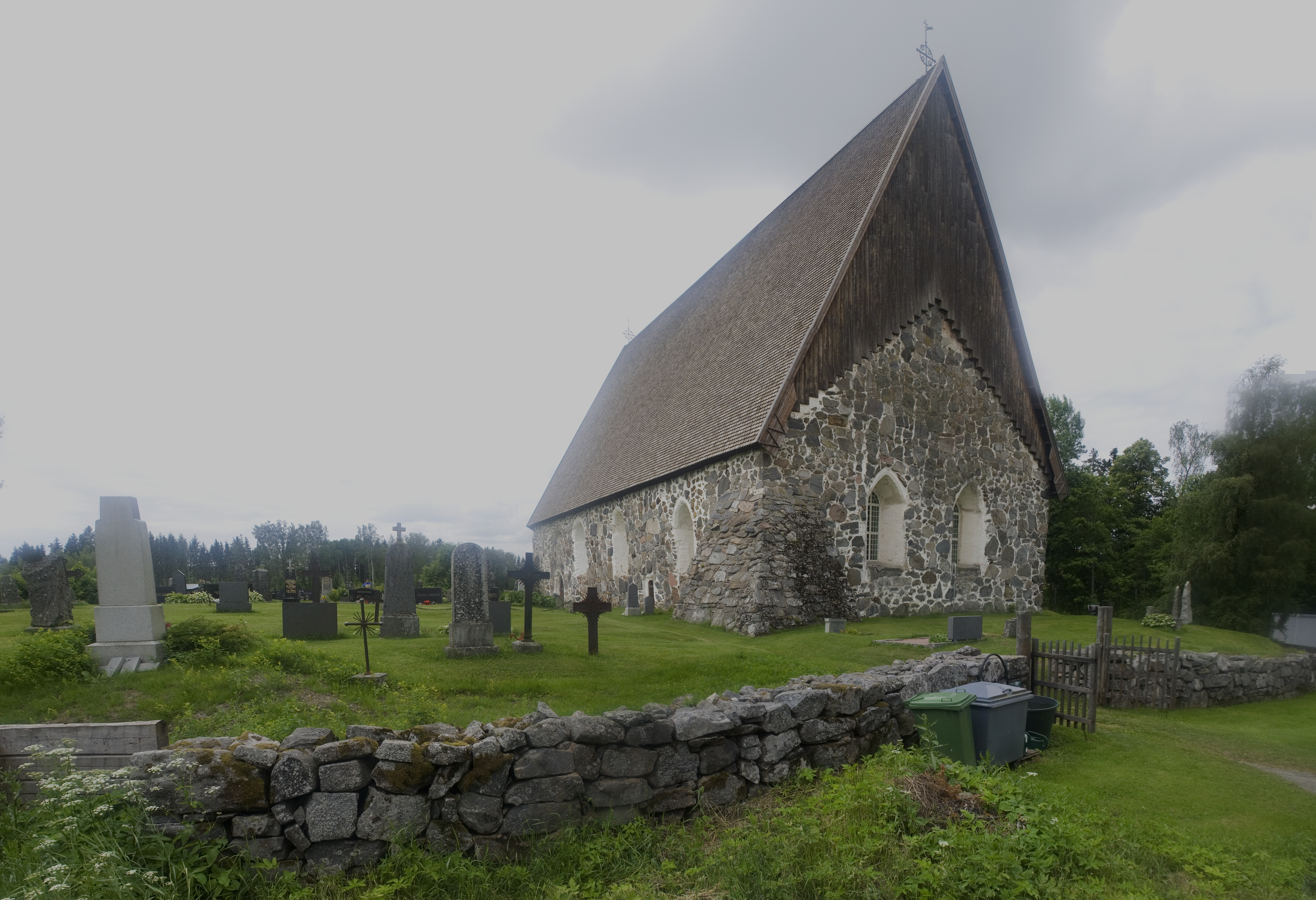
- The Medieval Sastamala Church in Karkku.

- Coat of arms
- Interactive map of Karkku
- Coordinates: 61°25′06″N 023°00′47″E
- Country: Finland
- Region: Satakunta
- Parish: 1328
- Consolidated: 1973

Area
  - Land: 172.5 km^{2} (66.6 sq mi)

Population (1972)
  - Total: 2,625
  - Density: 15.22/km^{2} (39.41/sq mi)
- Time zone: UTC+2 (EET)
  - Summer (DST): UTC+3 (EEST)
- Climate: Dfc

Karkku is a former municipality in the Pirkanmaa region of Finland. It was consolidated in 1973 with Vammala, which in turn was consolidated with Äetsä and Mouhijärvi to create the town of Sastamala in 2009. Karkku is located by the lake Rautavesi, about 13 kilometres north of the Sastamala town center.

The village of Karkku is listed as a Cultural environment of national significance by the Finnish National Board of Antiquities.

== History ==
The village of Karkku was the center of the Medieval Sastamala socken (not to be confused with the modern town of Sastamala), which was one of the 10 original sockens of the historical province of Satakunta. During the 15th and 16th century, Sastamala was split into several smaller parishes.

The parish of Karkku was established in 1328. In Karkku is located three churches; the Medieval Saint Mary's Church from the late 15th century, the Karkku Church built in 1913 and the modernist Salokunta Church, completed in 1960 by the design of the architect Timo Penttilä.

The Karkku railway station was opened in 1895 as the Tampere–Pori railway was completed. The village is also known of the 1918 Finnish Civil War Battle of Karkku which was related to the Battle of Tampere.

Karkku is the birthplace of the politician Hannes Ryömä.
