= Suodenniemi =

Former municipality of southwestern Finland

Coordinates: 61°33′30″N 22°46′50″E

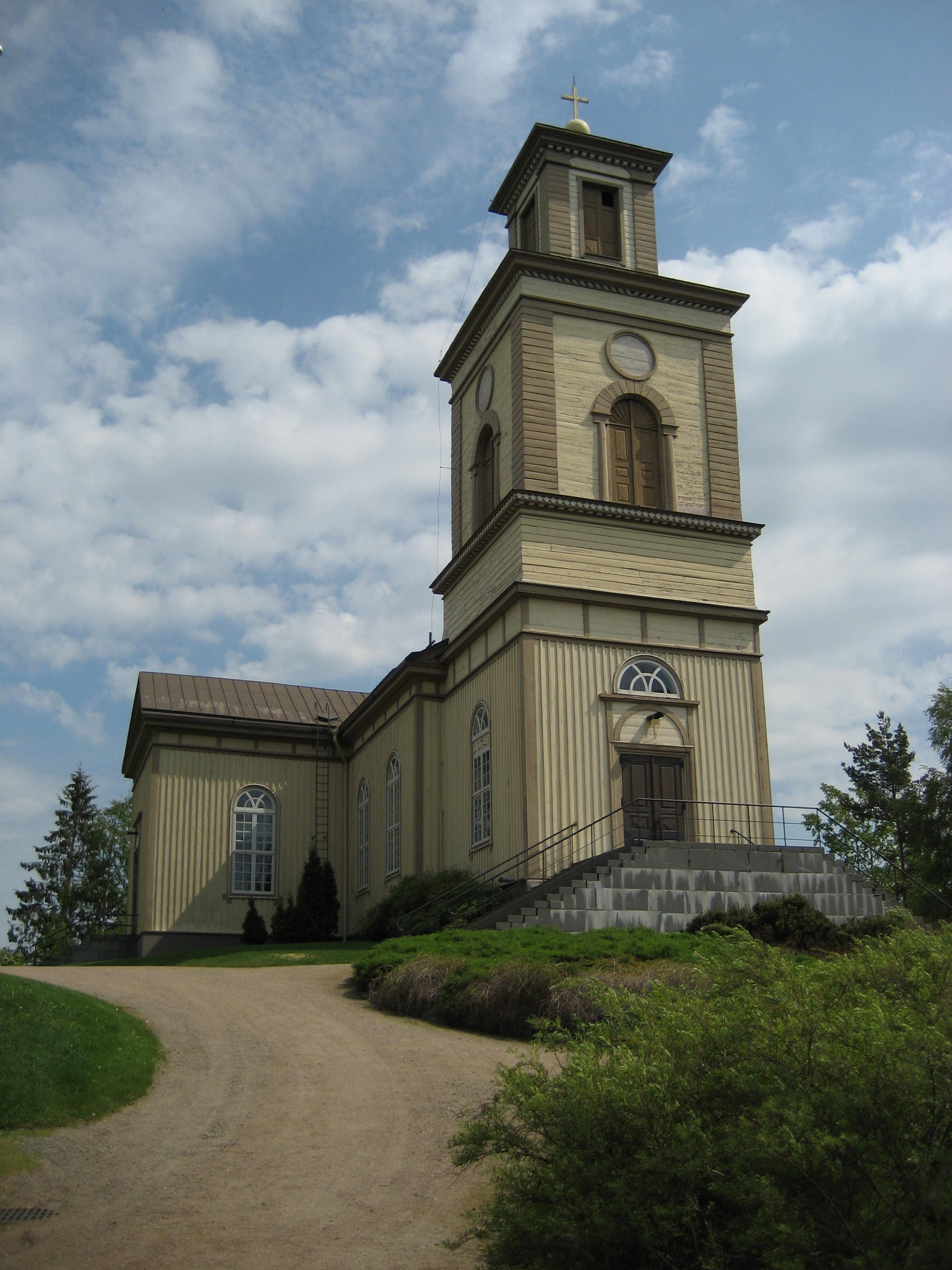
Historic Suodenniemi Lutheran Church

Suodenniemi is a former municipality of southwestern Finland.

Suodenniemi was first consolidated into Vammala in 2007. On 1 January 2009, Vammala itself was consolidated with Äetsä and Mouhijärvi to form the new named town of Sastamala.

== Geography ==
Suodenniemi was located in western Pirkanmaa region, and was part of the former provinces of Turku and Pori Province (1917 to 1997) and Western Finland Province (1997 to 2009).

=== Villages ===
Jalkavala, Kiikoistenmaa, Kittilä, Koivuniemi, Kouraniemi, Lahdenperä, Leppälammi, Makkonen, Pajuniemi, Peräkunta, Pohjakylä, Pyykoskenmaa, Suodenniemi (Kirkonkylä), Sävi and Taipale.

== Demographics ==
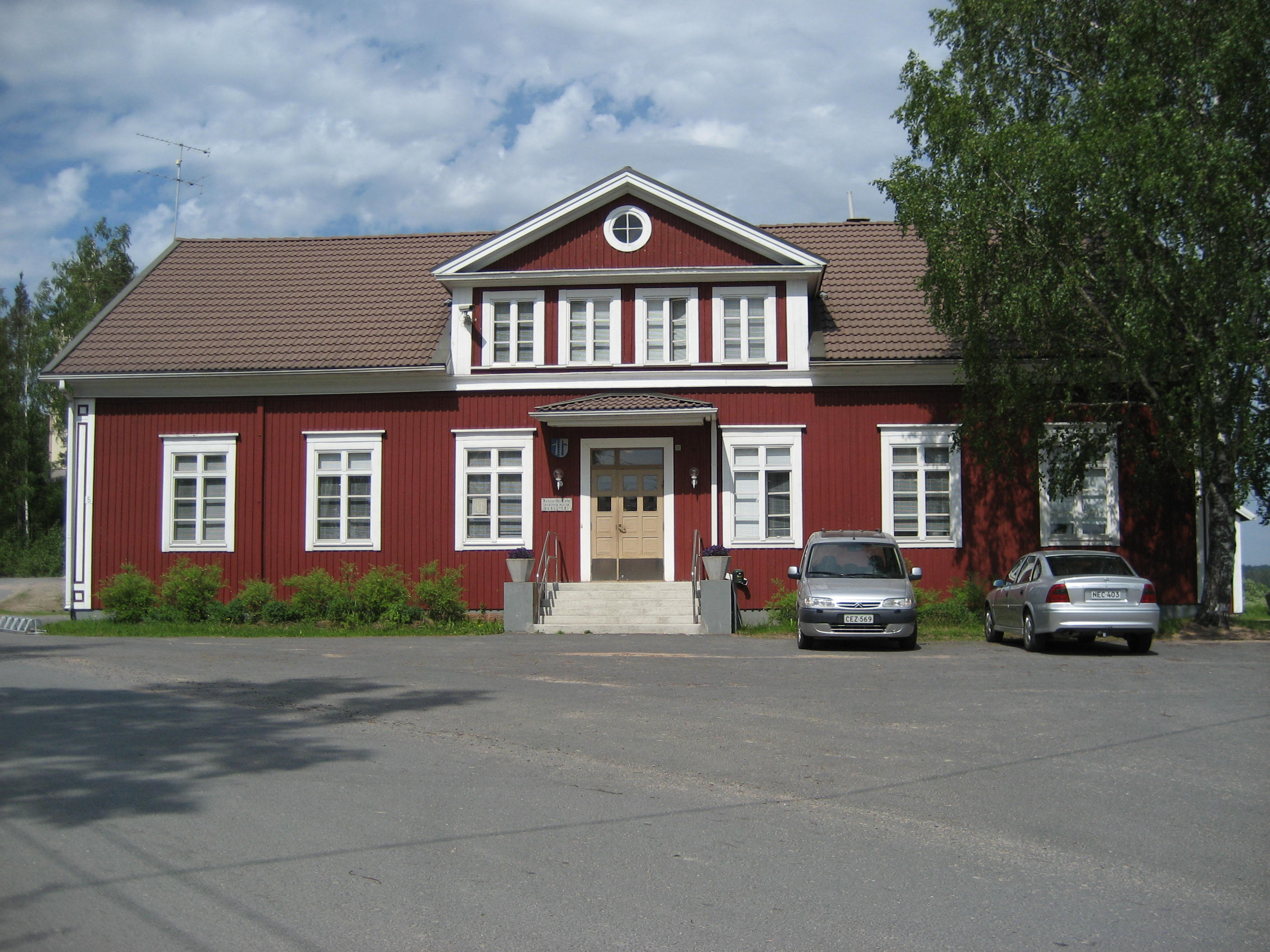
Suodenniemi Town Hall: (former).

The municipality had a population of 1,372 (2003) and covered an area of 220.83 square kilometres (85.26 sq mi) of which 13.20 square kilometres (5.10 sq mi) is water. The population density was 6.6 inhabitants per 1 square kilometre (0.39 sq mi).

The municipality was unilingually Finnish.
