= Rautavesi =

Rautavesi may refer to:

- Rautavesi (Hartola), a lake in Finland
- Rautavesi (Sastamala), a lake in Finland
