= Kero =

Kero may refer to:

== People ==
- Kero One, Korean-American hip hop producer and DJ
- Reino Kero (born 1939), Finnish historian
- Tanner Kero (born 1992), American ice hockey player

== Places ==
- Kérő, Gherla, Hungary
- Lake Kero, Finland

== Fictional characters ==
- Kero, legendary author of the Abrogans
- Kero-chan, a Cardcaptor Sakura character
- Kero (VTuber), a VTuber from VirtuaReal (the Chinese branch of Nijisanji)

== Other ==
- 24503 Kero, a minor planet
- Kero or Qiru, an Andean drinking vessel
- KERO-TV, an American television station
- Kero Blaster, a video game

== See also ==
- Quero (disambiguation)
