= St. Olaf's Church in Tyrvää (book) =

2010 book

St Olaf's Church In Tyrvää – One Hundred and One Paintings
- Author: Kuutti Lavonen, Osmo Rauhala, Pirjo Silveri
- Translator: Silja Kudel
- Cover artist: Ville Heinonen
- Language: English, Finnish
- Publisher: Kirjapaja
- Publication date: July 3, 2010
- Publication place: Finland
- ISBN: 978-952-247-103-1

St Olaf's Church In Tyrvää – One Hundred and One Paintings is a book published in 2010 by Kirjapaja. In the book Pirjo Silveri describes how the medieval St Olaf's Church in Tyrvää, Sastamala, Finland was reconstructed by hand after it was burned in 1997. Finnish contemporary painters Kuutti Lavonen and Osmo Rauhala made all the paintings. The painting are presented in the book, as are the artists. The material for the book consists of thousands of photos, interviewing tapes, notes and press clippings.

The book includes tens of photos of the reconstruction work and of the new paintings.

The book is in English and in Finnish. It was launched July 3, 2010, at the Old Book Festival in Sastamala, Finland. The writer of the book Pirjo Silveri was called to document the whole process of painting the interior of the church.
