= Rauma railway =

The Rauma railway might refer to:

- Kokemäki–Rauma railway in Finland
- Rauma Line in Norway
