= Kuutti Lavonen =

Finnish painter and photographer (born 1960)

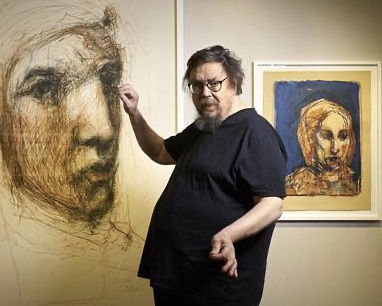
Lavonen in 2020

Kuutti Lavonen (born 7 February 1960 in Kotka, Finland) is a Finnish painter, photographer, and graphic artist, who has worked as professor at the Academy of Fine Arts (Finland). His poetry book Havahtumisia was published in 2005 by Kirjapaja.

Lavonen contributed to the book St. Olaf's Church in Tyrvää. With Osmo Rauhala he painted the interior of St Olaf's Church in Tyrvää, Finland, after it was torched by a pyromaniac.
