= Mahnalanselkä – Kirkkojärvi =

Lake in Finland

- Location within Finland
- Location: Hämeenkyrö
- Coordinates: 61°35′00″N 23°14′30″E
- Primary inflows: Pappilanjoki river, lake Kyrösjärvi
- Primary outflows: Siuronkoski rapids to lake Kulovesi
- Catchment area: Kokemäenjoki
- Basin countries: Finland
- Max. width: about 20 km (12 mi)
- Surface area: 19.544 km^{2} (7.546 sq mi)
- Average depth: 4.81 m (15.8 ft)
- Max. depth: 25.58 m (83.9 ft)
- Water volume: 0.0941 km^{3} (76,300 acre⋅ft)
- Shore length^{1}: 84.56 km (52.54 mi)
- Surface elevation: 60.6 m (199 ft)
- Frozen: December–April
- ^{1} Shore length is not a well-defined measure.

Mahnalanselkä – Kirkkojärvi is a medium-sized lake in Finland. It is located in Pirkanmaa region in the Finnish Lakeland and in the Hämeenkyrö municipality. The lake is quite narrow and about 20 km long. There are four sub-lakes in the lake. The northeast part is called Kirkkojärvi, and southward is the Laitilansalmi strait, Kallioistenselkä open water, the Kallioistenahdas strait, the Mahnalanselkä open water and a narrow sublake called Jokisjärvi.

In Finland there are 17 lakes called Kirkkojärvi. This is the biggest of them.

== See also ==
- List of lakes in Finland
