= St. Olaf's Church, Tyrvää =

Late medieval fieldstone church in Tyrvää, Sastamala, Finland

St. Olaf's Church in Tyrvää
- Tyrvään Pyhän Olavin kirkko
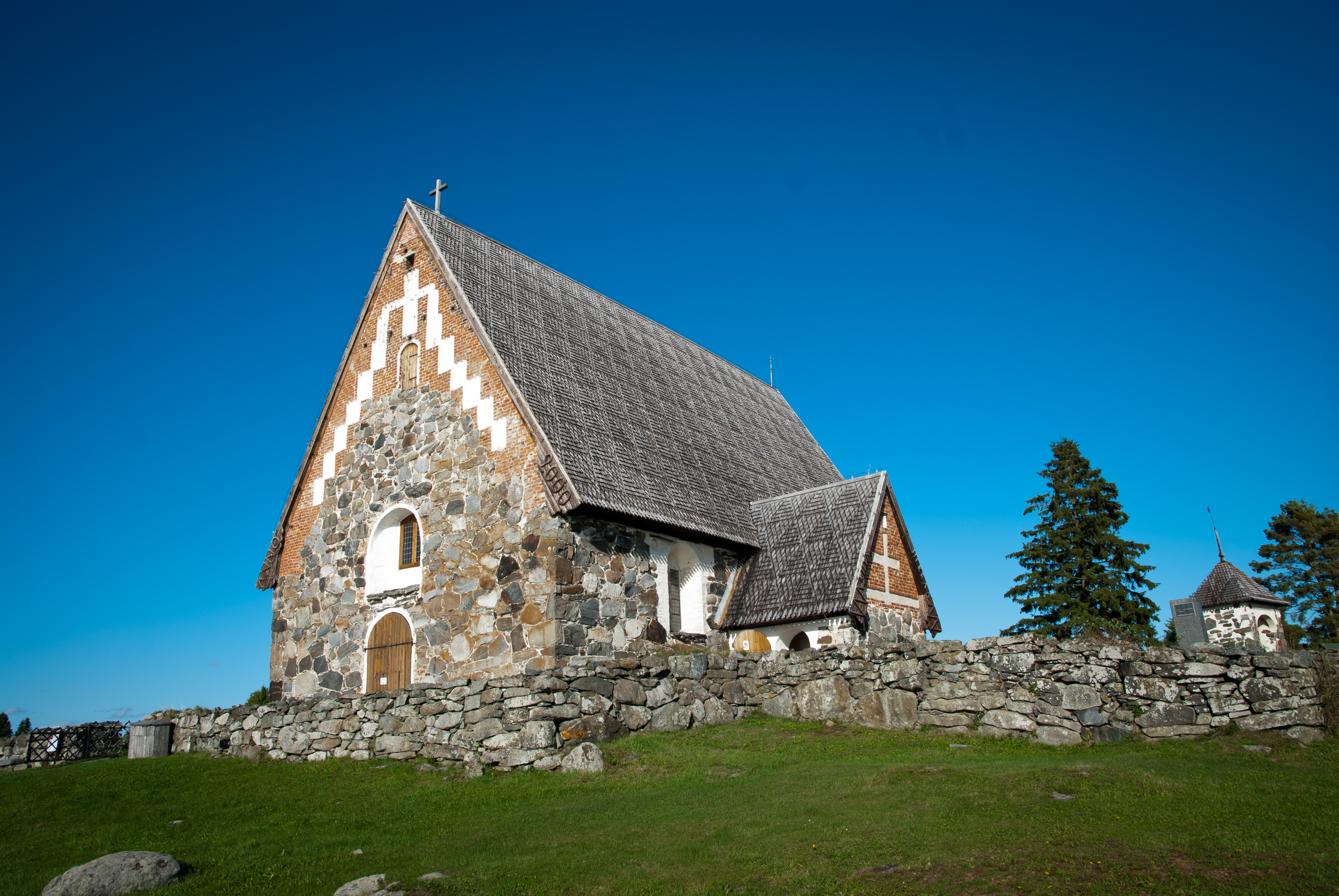
- St. Olaf's Church in Tyrvää

Religion
- Affiliation: Evangelical Lutheran Church of Finland
- Region: Pirkanmaa
- Ecclesiastical or organisational status: rebuilt 1997–2003
- Status: active

Location
- Location: Vammala, Sastamala, Finland
- Interactive map of St. Olaf's Church in Tyrvää
- Coordinates: 61°21′13″N 022°56′29″E

Architecture
- Style: Medieval

Website
- www.pyhaolavi.fi

St. Olaf's Church in Tyrvää (Finnish: Tyrvään Pyhän Olavin kirkko, Swedish: Tyrvis Sankt Olofs kyrka) is a late medieval fieldstone church in Tyrvää, Sastamala, Finland. It is located on the shore of lake Rautavesi. The church was built approximately in 1510–1516 and burnt down by an arsonist on 21 September 1997.

From 1997 to 2003 the church was rebuilt by local people and the interior paintings were created by painters Kuutti Lavonen and Osmo Rauhala.

The reconstruction of the church is documented in the book St. Olaf's Church in Tyrvää by Kuutti Lavonen, Osmo Rauhala, and Pirjo Silveri.
