= Pajuniemi =

Village in Sastamala, Finland

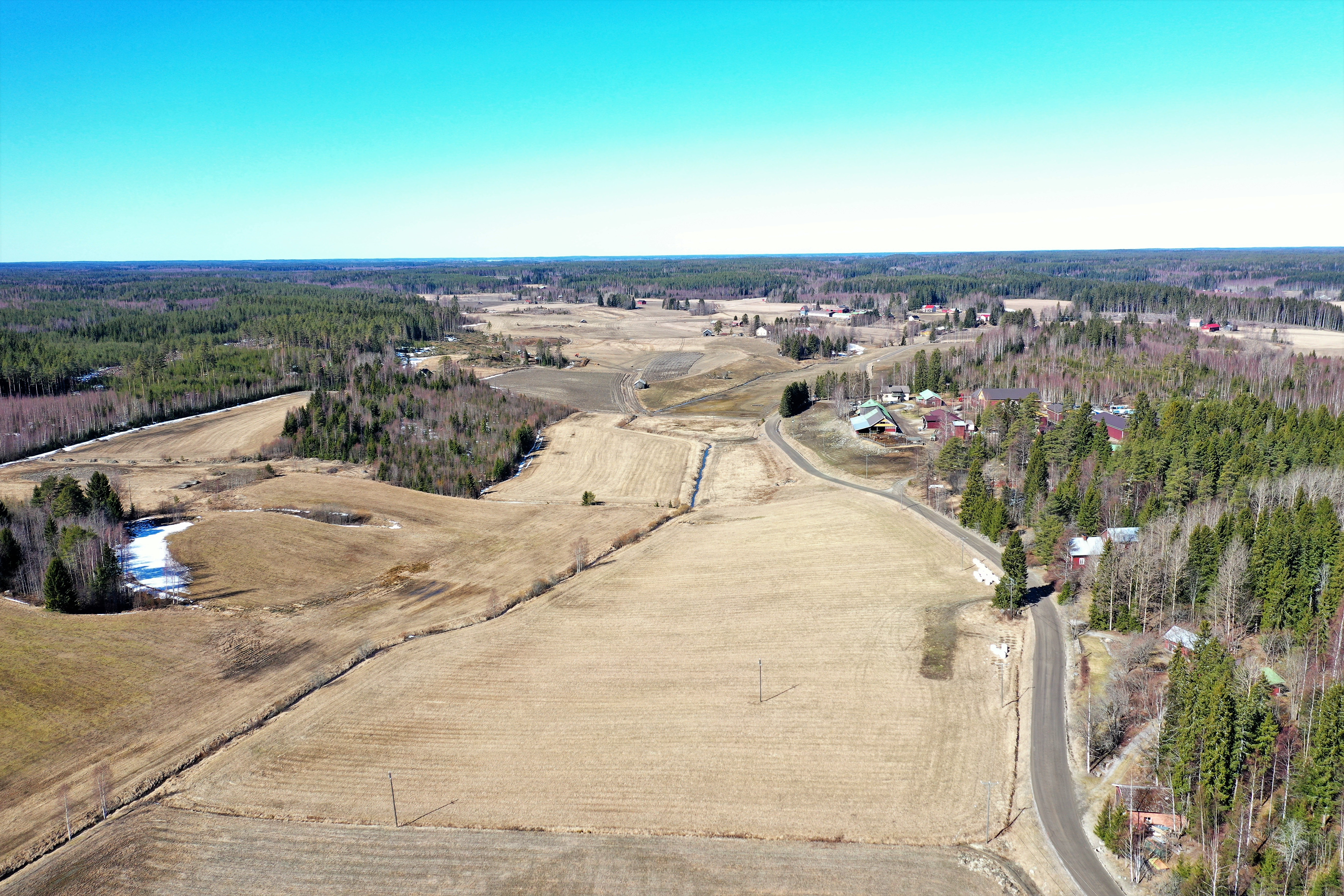
Field landscape in Pajuniemi.

Pajuniemi is a village located in Suodenniemi, Sastamala in Pirkanmaa, Finland. In the east it borders Lake Kourajärvi, in the north the village of Suodenniemi and in the west the border of Pori. In the south, Pajuniemi's neighbors are the villages of Kiikoistenmaa and Kouraniemi. The village itself is located on the edges of the valley opening to Lake Kourajärvi and in the surroundings.
