= Tainionvirta =

Coordinates: 61.445°N 25.732°E

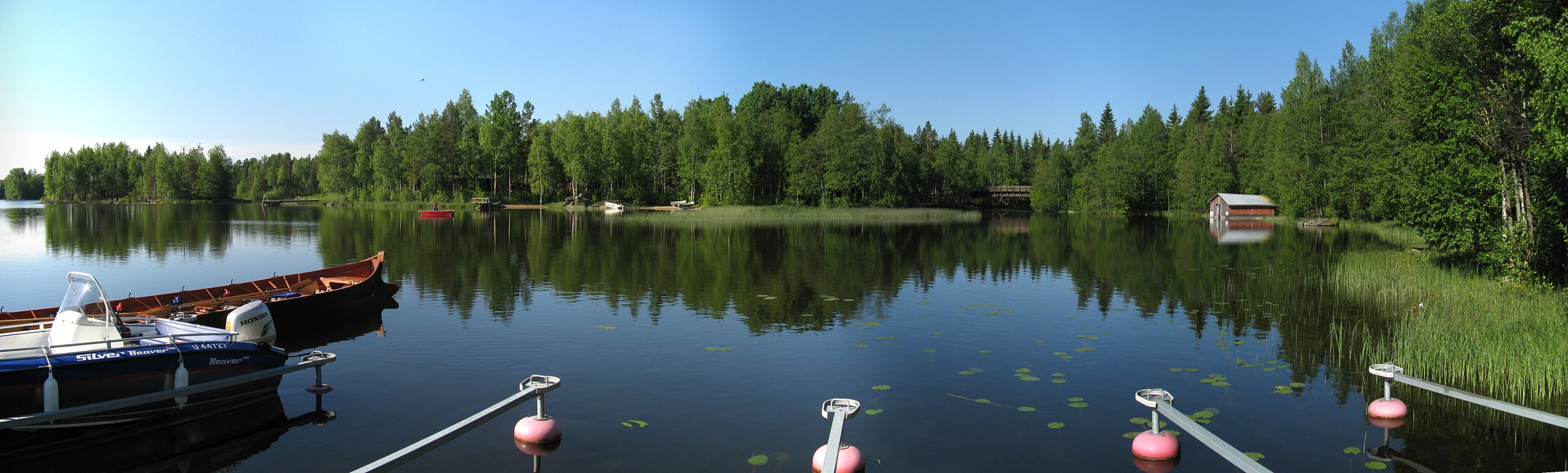
- The beginning of the Tainionvirta south-west of Jääsjärvi

Location
- Country: Finland
- Region: Päijät-Häme

Physical characteristics
- Length: 6 to 7 km (3.7 to 4.3 mi)

The Tainionvirta is a river in the Päijät-Häme region of Finland. It begins at Jääsjärvi, Hartola. At Sysmä the river flows into the Päijänne. Its length is 6 to 7 kilometres (3.7 to 4.3 mi), and it drops about 5 metres (16 ft). There are five rapids, but typically water flows quite slowly. It is possible to paddle the river.

== See also ==
- List of rivers of Finland
