= Ahlainen =

- Former municipality
- Ahlaisten kunta Vittisbofjärd kommun
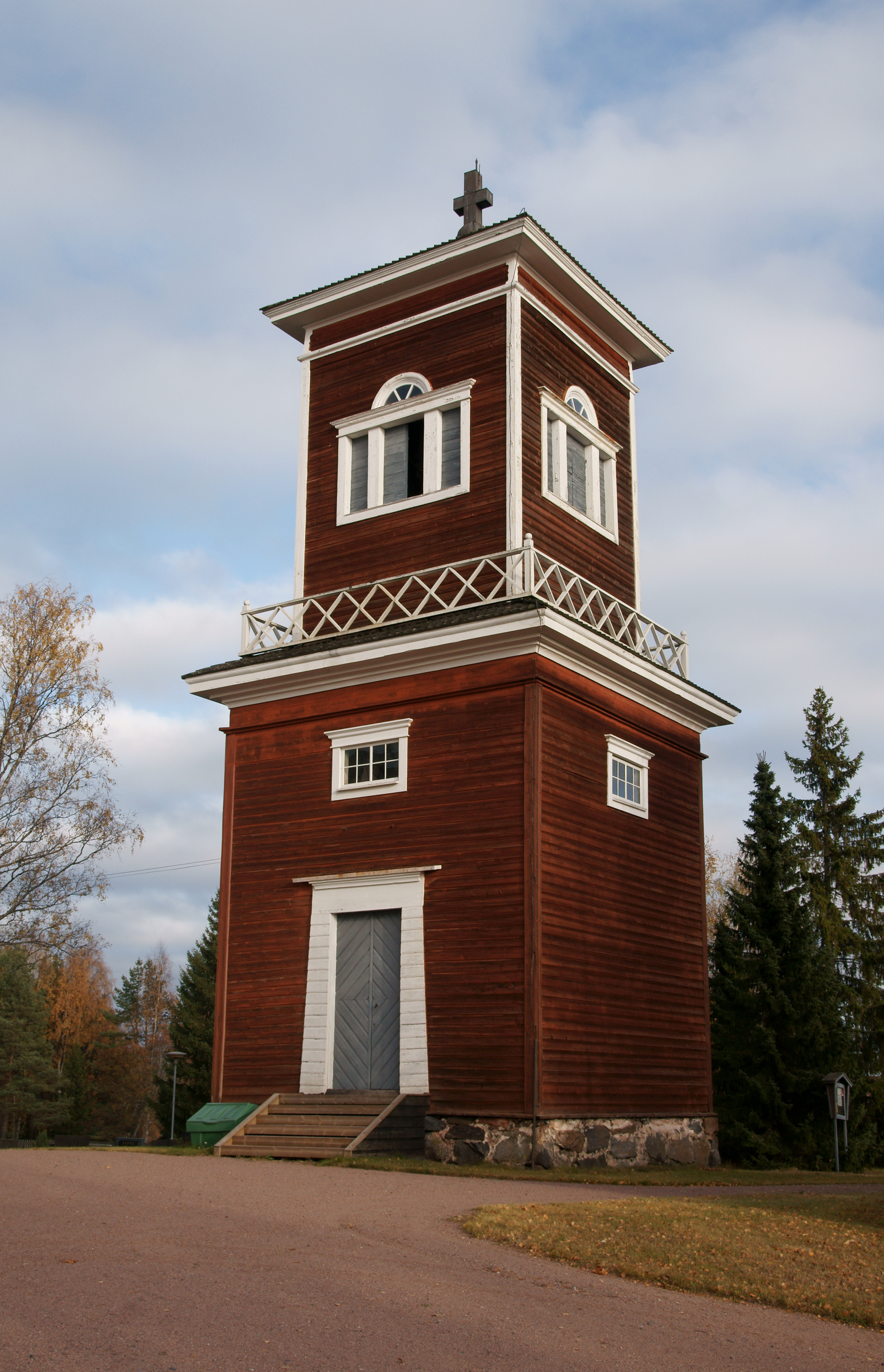
- Bell tower of Ahlainen Church, designed by C. L. Engel (1832)

- Coat of arms

- Location of Ahlainen in Finland
- Interactive map of Ahlainen
- Coordinates: 61°40′32″N 021°37′12″E
- Country: Finland
- Region: Satakunta
- Consolidated: 1972

Area
  - Land: 183.6 km^{2} (70.9 sq mi)

Population (1971)
  - Total: 2,445
  - Density: 13.32/km^{2} (34.49/sq mi)
- Time zone: UTC+2 (EET)
  - Summer (DST): UTC+3 (EEST)
- Climate: Dfc

Ahlainen (Swedish: Vittisbofjärd) is a former municipality in the province of Satakunta, Finland. It was annexed with the city of Pori in 1972. The population of Ahlainen was 2,445 in 1971.

The estimated population in 2022 was 339. But during the summer, the population is said to double when residents return to the village.

== History ==
The people of Huittinen originally held the area as hunting grounds, reflected in the Swedish name Vittisbofjärd. The village and inlet called Keikvesi are named after Keikyä, originally a part of Huittinen. Soon after Satakunta became part of Sweden, the area of Ahlainen and Merikarvia was settled by Swedes. Ahlainen was first mentioned in 1427 when it was a part of the Ulvila parish. It became a chapel community in 1736. Noormarkku was subordinate to the chapel community of Ahlainen until 1861 when Noormarkku became an independent parish, after which Ahlainen and Pomarkku were subordinated to it. Ahlainen eventually became a separate parish in 1908.

In the 17th century, Ahlainen was predominantly Swedish-speaking. By the 18th century, the proportion of Finnish-speakers had grown in the area. During the 19th century, Finnish had become the majority language, and most Swedes knew how to speak Finnish. Local priests began to oppose the use of Swedish in the church in the 1860s, believing that the local dialect was "distorted" compared to standard Swedish. There were 476 Swedish-speakers (out of 3,618 people) living in Ahlainen according to an 1885 census, while a census in 1960 only found one Swedish-speaker out of 2,984 people.

Ahlainen was consolidated with the town of Pori in 1972. The parish was also merged into the Pori parish.
