= Quero =

Quero may refer to:

== People ==
- Diego Arias Quero (born 1999), Chilean football player
- Edgar Quero (born 2003), Cuban baseball player in MLB
- Eduin Quero (born 1997), Venezuelan football player
- Félix Quero (born 1982), Spanish football player
- Jeferson Quero (born 2002), Venezuelan baseball player
- Juan Quero (born 1984), Spanish football player
- Manuel Cortés Quero (1906-1991), Spanish politician
- Manuel Quero Turillo (1554–1605), Roman Catholic prelate

== Places ==
- Quero, Spain
- Quero, Veneto, Italy
- Quero Canton, Ecuador
- Quero Vas, Italy
- San José de Quero District, Peru

== Other ==
- 78652 Quero, a minor planet
- Querô, a 2007 Brazilian film
- Quero, a Brazilian company owned by Kraft Heinz

== See also ==
- Kero (disambiguation)
