= Nokianvirta =

River in the country of Finland

Coordinates: 61°27′54″N 23°23′00″E

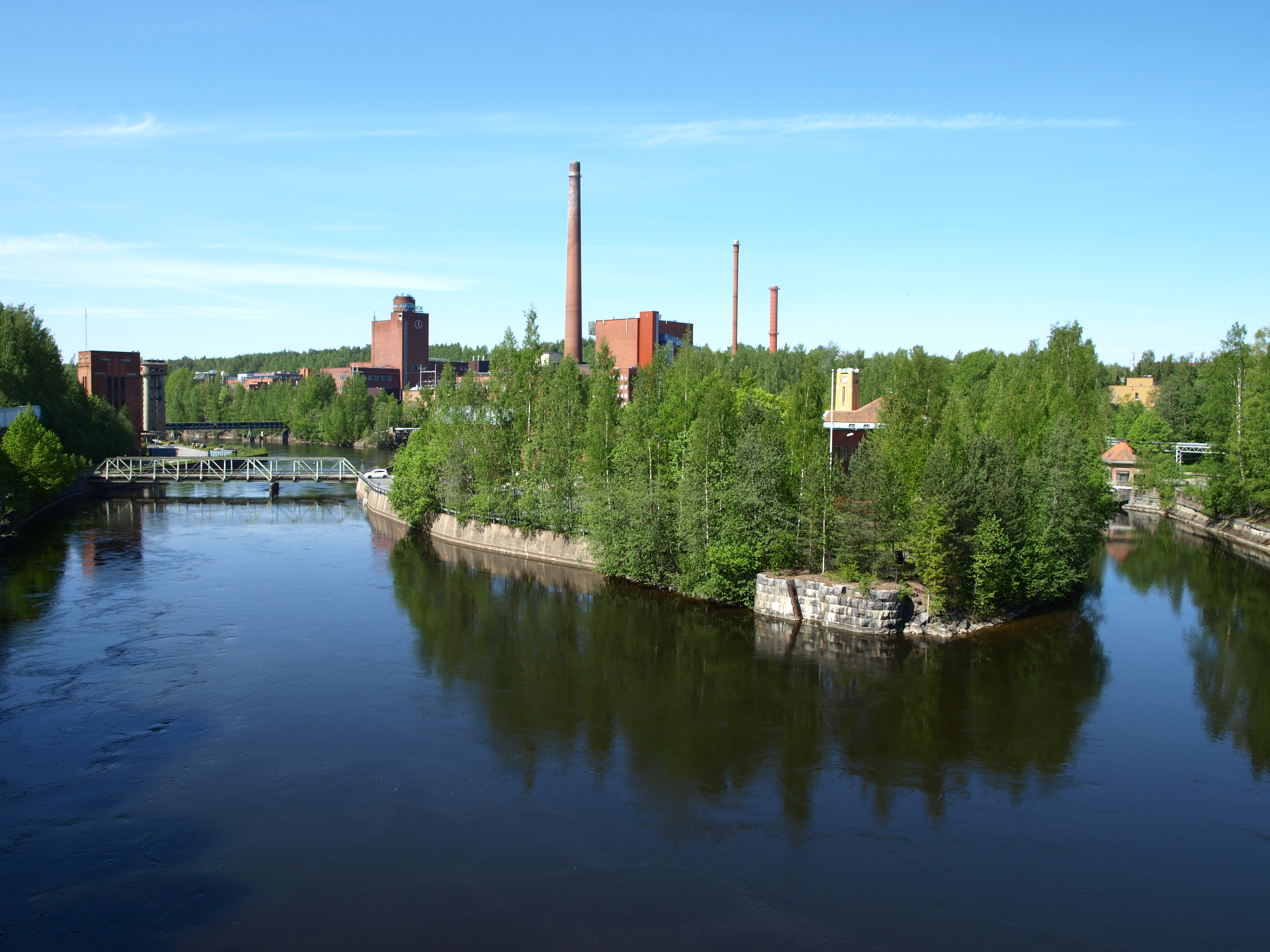
River Nokianvirta near the town centrum in Nokia

Nokianvirta is a river of Finland. It flows from the lake Pyhäjärvi near Tampere to the lake Kulovesi, which is a part of a lake system from which the Kokemäki River begins its course towards the Gulf of Bothnia. Nokianvirta flows through Nokia, Finland, the town that gave its name to the Nokia Corporation.

== See also ==
- List of rivers of Finland
