= Rautavesi (Hartola) =

Lake of Finland

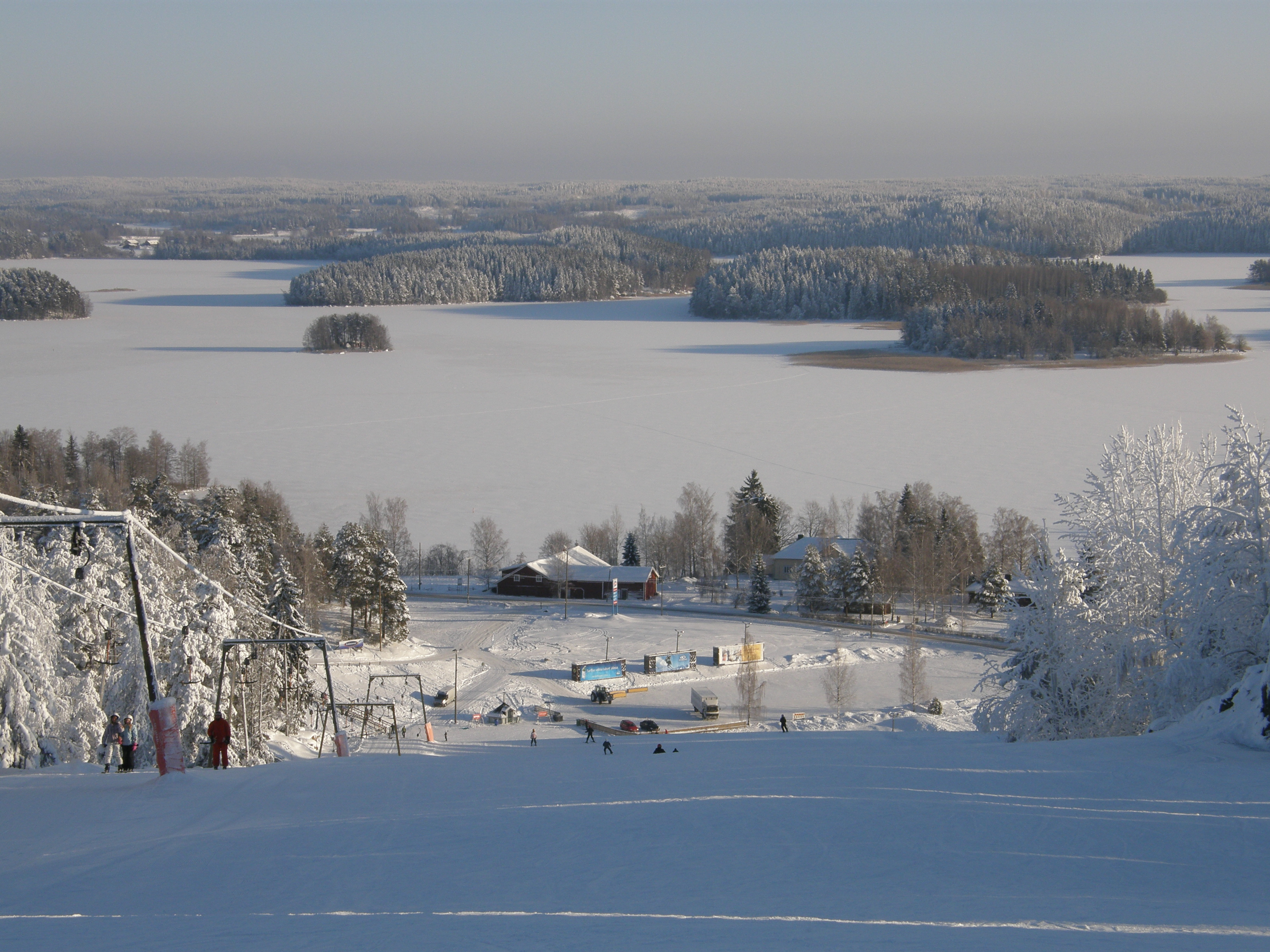
- Lake Rautavesi

- Location within Finland
- Location: Hartola (Finland), Joutsa
- Coordinates: 61°38′N 25°59′E
- Lake type: Natural
- Primary outflows: Rääpönsalmi, Angesselkä
- Catchment area: Kymijoki
- Basin countries: Finland
- Surface area: 46.165 km^{2} (17.824 sq mi)
- Average depth: 8.51 m (27.9 ft)
- Max. depth: 64.71 m (212.3 ft)
- Water volume: 0.393 km^{3} (0.094 cu mi)
- Shore length^{1}: 207.49 km (128.93 mi)
- Surface elevation: 92.3 m (303 ft)
- Frozen: December–April
- Islands: Petäjäsaari, Tiukansaari
- ^{1} Shore length is not a well-defined measure.

Rautavesi (Hartola) is a medium-sized lake of Finland. It is located in Hartola and Joutsa municipalities, in the regions Central Finland and Päijät-Häme. The water quality in the lake is excellent. Water flows down to the lake Jääsjärvi. The lake is quite near to the Finnish national road 4, about ten kilometers southwards from Joutsa.

== See also ==
- List of lakes in Finland
