= Kokemäki–Rauma railway =

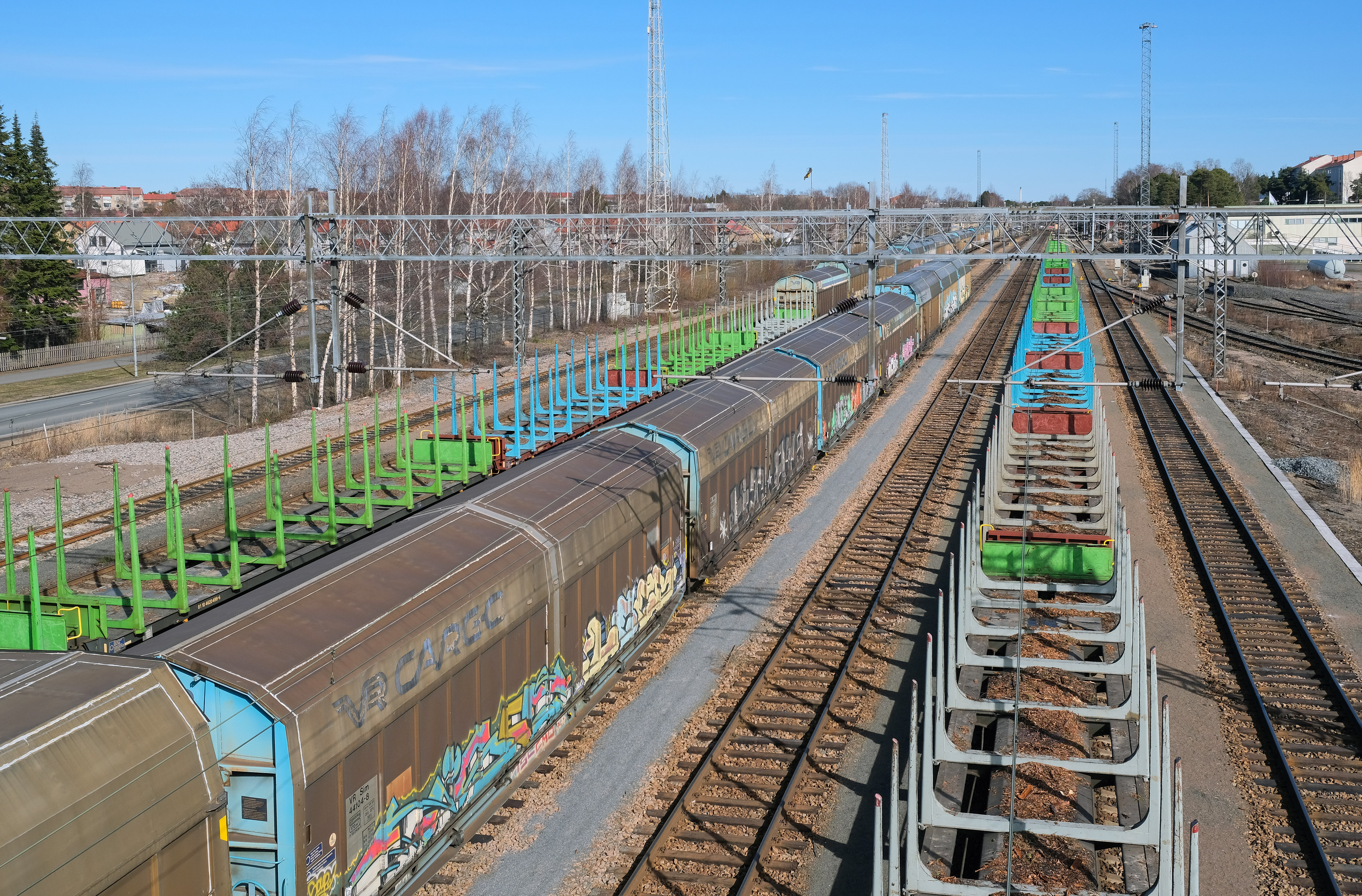

Overview
- Locale: Satakunta, Finland
- Termini: Kokemäki; Rauma
- Connecting lines: Tampere–Pori railway

History
- Opened: 1897

Technical
- Line length: 47 km (29 mi)
- Number of tracks: 1
- Track gauge: 1,524 mm (5 ft)
- Electrification: 25 kV 50 Hz AC
- Signalling: JKV

The Kokemäki–Rauma railway is a 1,524 mm (5 ft) gauge railway line in Finland, running 47 kilometres (29 mi) between the city of Rauma and the Tampere–Pori railway at Kokemäki station.

== History ==
The city of Rauma decided to build a private railway to Port of Rauma, after the Finnish State Railways had decided to build its railway to the competing Port of Pori. The Senate of Finland gave permission for the line in 1894, and with FIM 1 million in funding from the state, construction began in 1895 and was completed in 1897.

The line had proven to be profitable by 1906, and a branch line to Karttua in Eura municipality to serve industry and connections to steamboat traffic on Lake Pyhäjärvi opened in 1913. Passenger traffic on the branch line was terminated in 1953. The branch line has not seen any freight traffic since 2009, and has since been decommissioned.

In 1950, the line was transferred from the city of Rauma to state ownership. It was electrified between 1994 and 1997.

Passenger traffic was terminated in 1988. The Finnish government has announced funding for re-instating passenger traffic starting in 2027, and construction for a new halt at Rauma began in April 2026.
