= Tampere–Pori railway =

Railway line in Finland

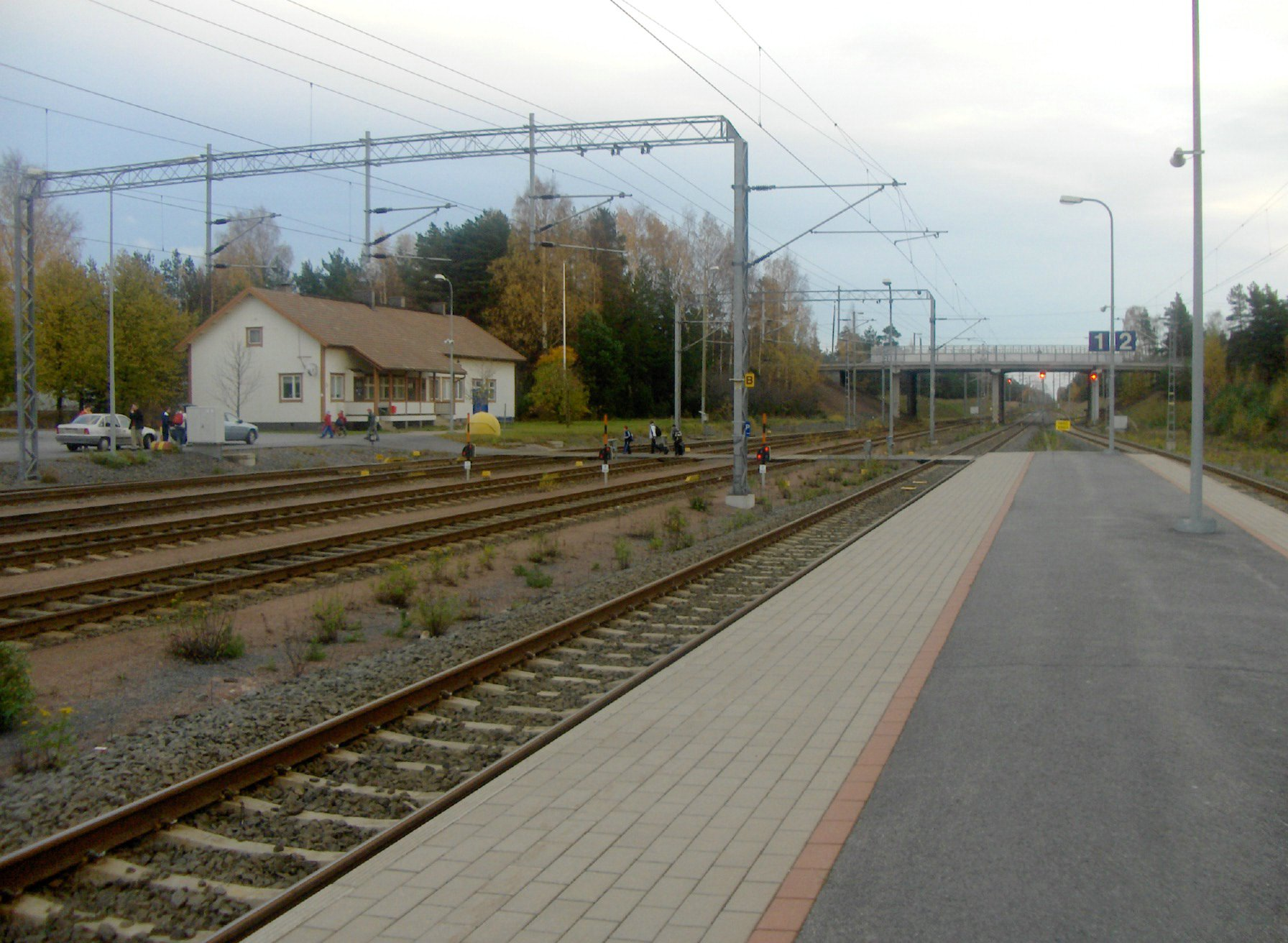
- The tracks and platforms at Harjavalta station in 2005

Overview
- Termini: Tampere; Pori
- Stations: 7

History
- Opened: 1895

Technical
- Line length: 155 km (96.31 mi)
- Number of tracks: Double (Tampere–Lielahti); Single (Lielahti–Mäntyluoto)
- Track gauge: 1,524 mm (5 ft)
- Electrification: 25 kV @ 50 Hz
- Operating speed: 100 to 140 km/h (62 to 87 mph)

The Tampere–Pori railway is a railway running between the cities of Tampere and Pori in Finland. The line carries passenger traffic from Tampere to Pori via five railway stations and continues as a freight line to the Port of Pori. Tampere–Pori railway was opened in 1895 and the line follows the river Kokemäenjoki.

== History ==
=== Planning and construction ===
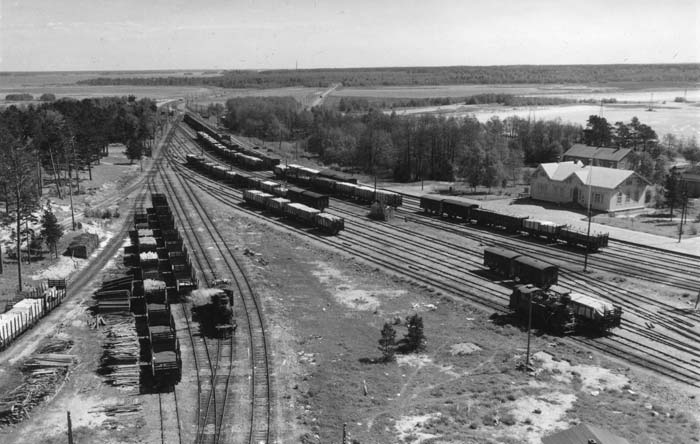
Mäntyluoto harbour in the 1950s

The idea of a railway linking Pori to inland Finland was first brought up in the 1860s. The railway north of Tampere was initially planned to run from the western side of lake Näsijärvi through the northern parts of Satakunta, from where a branch line would be built via Kankaanpää to Pori. However, in its 1877 session, the Diet of Finland decided to align the Tampere-Haapamäki line to the east of the Näsijärvi, and the first plan for the Pori line fell through. Since then, the project was received the strong backing of the timber processing industry, which wanted a rail link to the port of Reposaari. In the 1880s, three different options were drawn up for the railway: Pori-Kokemäki-Loimaa, Pori-Kokemäki-Urjala and Pori-Kokemäki-Tampere. The first two would have connected Pori to the Turku–Toijala railway, completed in 1876, and through it to the Finnish main line between Helsinki and Tampere.

The actual construction work began in 1890. The project was geographically divided into several work divisions, each of which employed at best several hundred men; for example, in the winter of 1892, the Kokemäki division had around 600 workers. A year later, work slowed down considerably due to lack of funds, but the section between Tampere and Kokemäki was finally opened for regular traffic in November 1894. In March of the following year, services to Harjavalta were started and the line was completed in its entirety in April 1895, after which the line was officially inaugurated in November. Two years after the completion of the Tampere–Pori section, the Senate decided to extend the line further to Mäntyluoto by 21 kilometres (13 mi), which had been nominated by the State Winter Transport Committee as Finland's second wintertime port. Construction of the line began in 1897 and was completed in 1900.

=== Extension plans ===
In the early 1900s, a railway connection was also planned from Helsinki via Loimaa to Pori, in which case the junction station would have been located in Kokemäki, Peipohja or Riste. In addition, Peipohja was also planned to become a junction station for the line to Uusikaupunki. However, the Peipohja-Uusikaupunki railway project was abandoned when the rantarata was extended from Turku to Uusikaupunki. On the other hand, the construction of a direct line between Helsinki and Kokemäki was considered important for the capital's food supply, but with bus traffic growing strongly in the 1930s, this plan was also abandoned. Lielahti in Tampere became a junction station when the Tampere–Seinäjoki direct line was completed in 1971. In 1984, an 11 kilometres (6.8 mi) long siding was built from the former Kaanaa halt on the Pori–Mäntyluoto line to Tahkoluoto. Passenger services between Pori and Mäntyluoto were discontinued in 1953, but were briefly reinstated on a trial basis with Dm7 railbuses in 1975.

=== Electrification ===
The electrification of the Tampere-Kokemäki-Rauma line was completed in January 1998, and the Kokemäki-Pori section followed in May 1999. In October 2016, the Finnish Transport Infrastructure Agency and the city of Pori signed a letter of intent regarding the electrification the Mäntyluoto and Tahkoluoto sections of the line. The electrification between Mäntyluoto and Pori was completed and activated in January 2020. The electrified connection between Mäntyluoto and Tahkoluoto was completed in December 2020.

== Overview ==
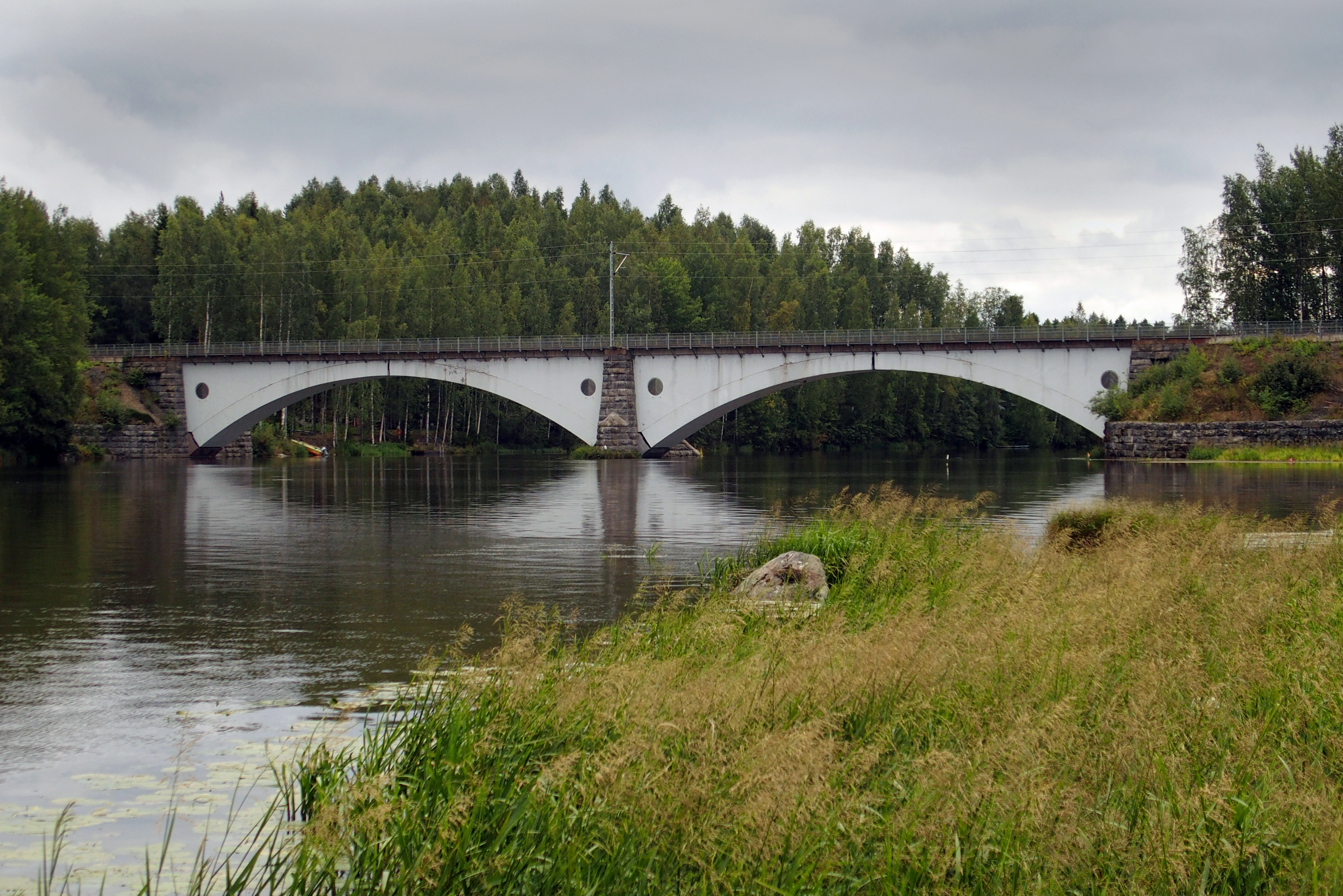
Pahakoski bridge

The Tampere-Pori line follows river Kokemäenjoki and its waterways throughout its path. The crossing of the river takes place at Riste in Kokemäki via four bridges. The altitude of the line decreases by more than 100 metres (330 ft) from Tampere to Pori, although there are no particularly steep inclines except between Nokia and Siuro. The only tunnel on the line was on the former Linnavuori siding in Siuro, but there are several steep cliffs. The tightest curves on the line were straightened in Nokia, Vammala and Riste in the 1960s and 1980s, with the line being moved to a completely different location in some places. Even then, the line follows the banks of the Kulovesi and Rautavesi lakes in many locations.

Most of the smaller stations and halts between Pori and Kokemäki were closed during the 1960s and 1970s, and later, by the end of the 1980s, between Kokemäki and Tampere as well. The original station buildings are still in use in Nokia, Karkku and Vammala, and closed ones remain in Siuro, Kiikka and Nakkila. Many of the original station buildings along the line were destroyed during the Finnish Civil War in the spring of 1918. The Siuronkoski railway bridge on the municipal border between Suoniemi and Pohjois-Pirkkala and the Pahakoski railway bridge in Kokemäki were also destroyed during the war. The Pori station was moved approximately 1.5 kilometres (0.93 mi) southeast from its original location during the construction of the Pori-Haapamäki railway line in the 1930s.
