= Reino Kero =

Finnish historian (born 1939)

Reino Kero (2 March 1939 in Kiikka), is a Finnish historian, PhD 1974. Kero was professor in general history at the University of Turku from 1999 to 2002.

Kero has focused on the Finnish emigration to North America. He has also written on Finnish-American immigrants in Soviet Carelia (1983), and a book on American history (1996) and on Indians (1986).

== Bibliography ==
- Migration from Finland to North America (1974)
- Neuvosto-Karjalaa rakentamassa (1983)
- Intiaanien Amerikka (1986)
- Suomen siirtolaisuuden historia, I-III (1983–86, with Auvo Kostiainen, Arja Pilli and Keijo Virtanen)
- Uuden maailman jättiläinen (1991, with Auvo Kostiainen and Keijo Virtanen)
- Suureen länteen (1996)
