= Lake Kero =

- Location within Finland
- Location: Kuusamo
- Coordinates: 65.667°N 29.157°E
- Type: lake
- Catchment area: Iijoki
- Basin countries: Finland
- Surface area: 20.925 km^{2} (8.079 sq mi)
- Average depth: 3.42 m (11.2 ft)
- Max. depth: 17.5 m (57 ft)
- Water volume: 0.0715 km^{3} (58,000 acre⋅ft)
- Shore length^{1}: 51.73 km (32.14 mi)
- Surface elevation: 236.5 m (776 ft)
- Frozen: November–May
- Islands: Iso Käsmänsaari
- Settlements: Kuusamo
- ^{1} Shore length is not a well-defined measure.

Lake Kero is a medium-sized lake in Finland. It is situated in Kuusamo municipality in the Northern Ostrobothnia region, and it belongs to the Iijoki main catchment area. The southern part of the lake is called Iso-Kero and the northern part is called Keski-Kero.

== See also ==
- List of lakes in Finland
