= Jääsjärvi =

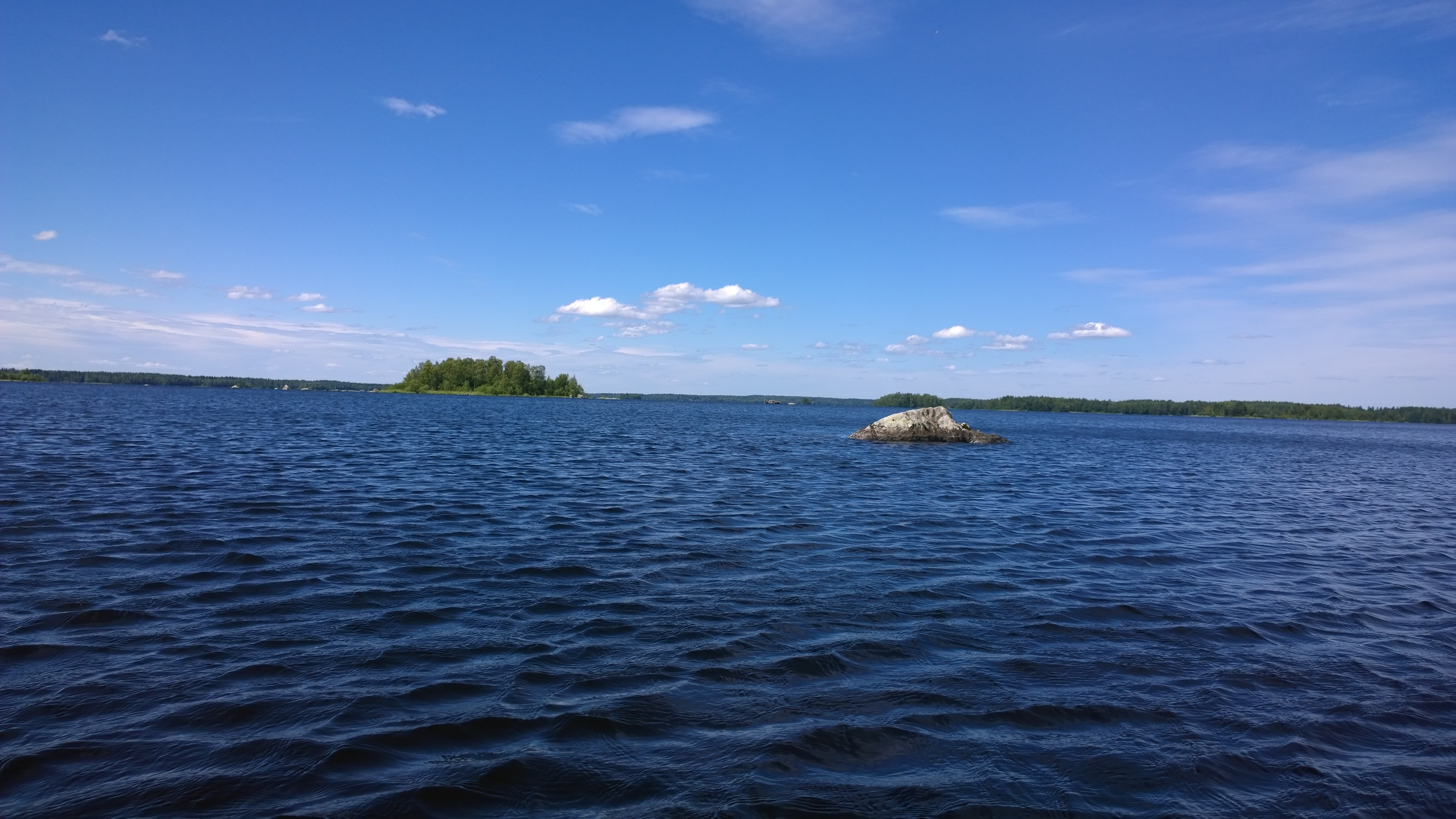

- Location within Finland
- Location: Hartola and Joutsa
- Coordinates: 61°36′N 26°07′E
- Type: Lake
- Primary outflows: Tainionvirta
- Catchment area: Kymijoki
- Basin countries: Finland
- Max. length: 10 km (6.2 mi)
- Max. width: 15 km (9.3 mi)
- Surface area: 81.11 km^{2} (31.32 sq mi)
- Average depth: 4.58 m (15.0 ft)
- Max. depth: 28.2 m (93 ft)
- Water volume: 0.372 km^{3} (302,000 acre⋅ft)
- Shore length^{1}: 303.73 km (188.73 mi)
- Surface elevation: 92.3 m (303 ft)
- Frozen: December–April
- Islands: Vehkasalo, Hirtesalo, Kotisalo, Ohrasaari, Urrionsaari, Nautsalo
- ^{1} Shore length is not a well-defined measure.

Jääsjärvi (Finnish: [ˈjæːsˌjærʋi]; lit. 'ice lake') is a medium-sized lake of Finland. It is located in the Hartola and Joutsa municipalities, in the Central Finland and Päijät-Häme regions. The water quality in the lake is excellent. The river Tainionvirta has its source in Jääsjärvi and flows through several smaller lakes to Päijänne. The water in Jääsjärvi is bright. The lake is part of the Sysmä catchment area and Kymijoki main catchment area.

There are dozens of islands in the lake. The biggest are Vehkasalo, Hirtesalo, Kotisalo, Ohrasaari, Urrionsaari, and Nautsalo. Vehkasalo, Hirtesalo, and Ohrasaari have roads connecting them to the mainland.

In winter time, the lake typically freezes.

== See also ==
- List of lakes in Finland
