= Tyrvää =

- Former municipality
- Tyrvään kunta Tyrvis kommun
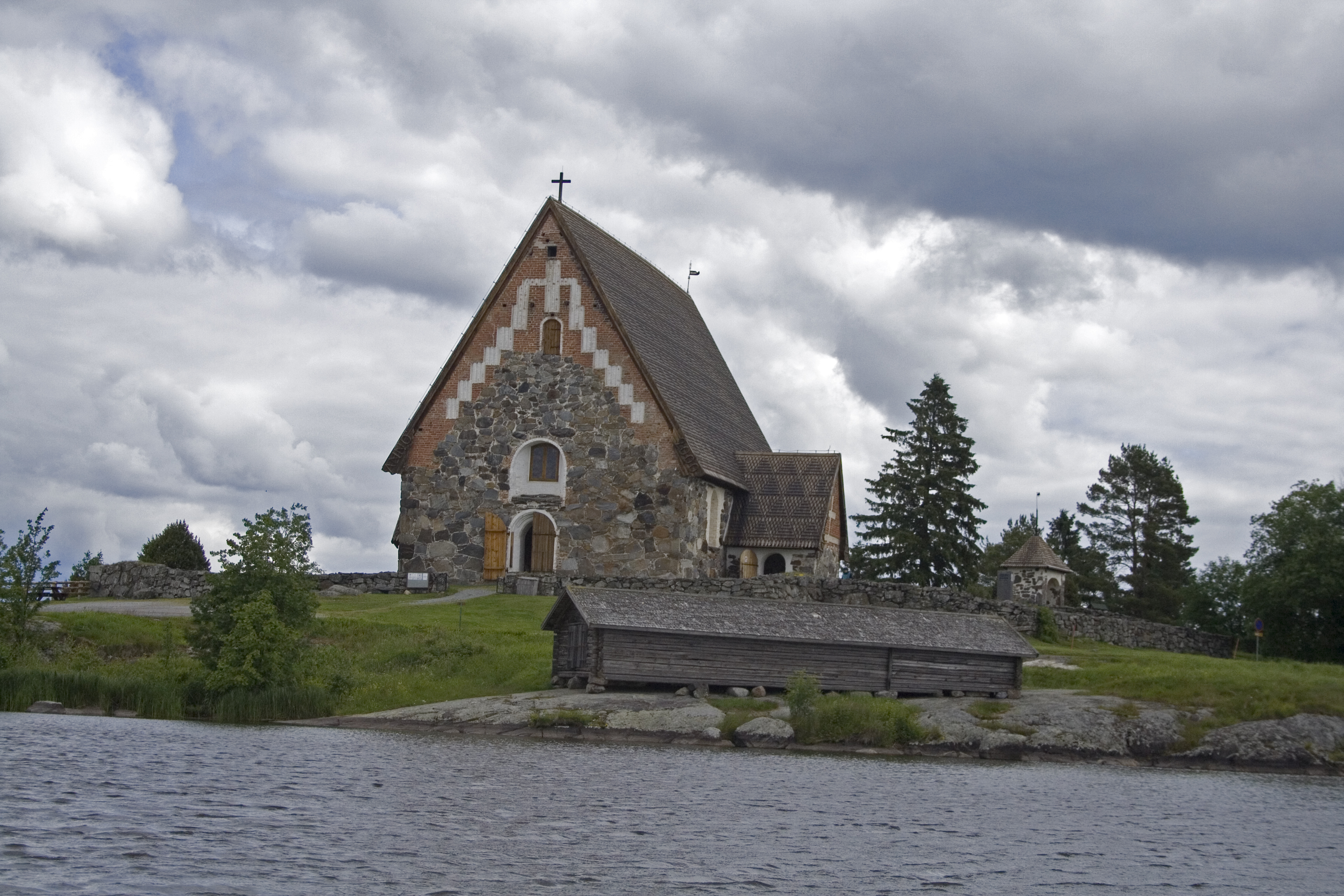
- The Medieval St. Olaf's Church.

- Coat of arms
- Interactive map of Tyrvää
- Coordinates: 61.347431°N 22.901361°E
- Country: Finland
- Region: Satakunta
- Parish: 1439
- Consolidated: 1973

Area
  - Land: 399.1 km^{2} (154.1 sq mi)

Population (1972)
  - Total: 7,260
  - Density: 18.2/km^{2} (47.1/sq mi)
- Time zone: UTC+2 (EET)
  - Summer (DST): UTC+3 (EEST)
- Climate: Dfc

Tyrvää (Finnish: [ˈtyrʋæː]; Swedish: Tyrvis) was a municipality in the Satakunta region, Turku and Pori Province, Finland. It was established in 1439 when the Tyrvää parish was separated from the parish of Karkku. In 1915, the market town of Vammala was separated from Tyrvää, and in 1973, Tyrvää was consolidated with Vammala. In 2009, Vammala became a part of the newly established town Sastamala.

The administrative center of the Tyrvää municipality was located north of Vammala, by the lakes Rautavesi and Liekovesi.

Tyrvää is known as the home of the prominent Finnish painter Akseli Gallen-Kallela, who was raised in Tyrvää, and the site of the medieval St. Olaf's Church. Finland's first woman writer, Theodolinda Hahnsson was born in Tyrvää. The twin tower Tyrvää Church was built in 1855.

== Gallery ==
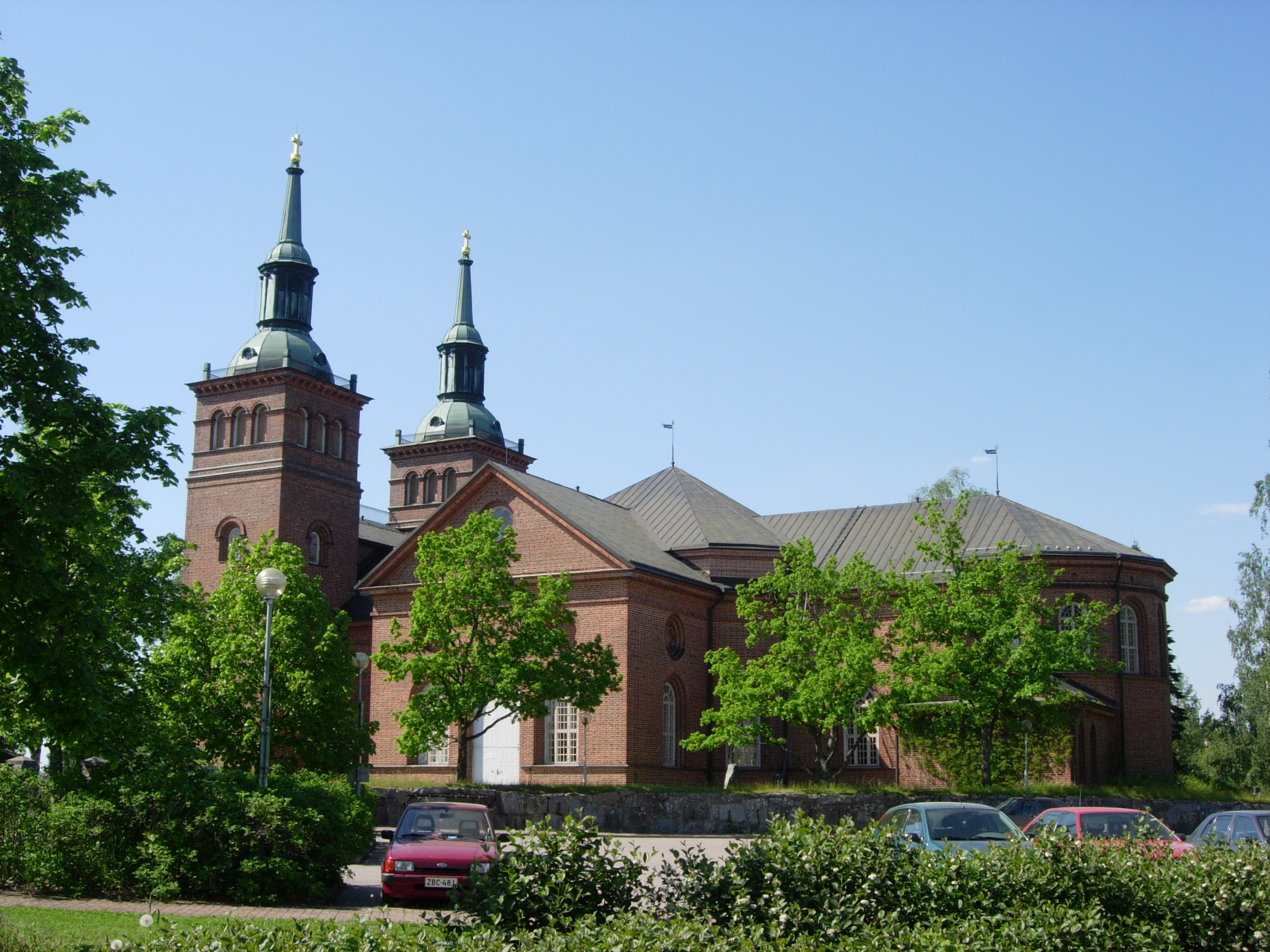
Tyrvää Church

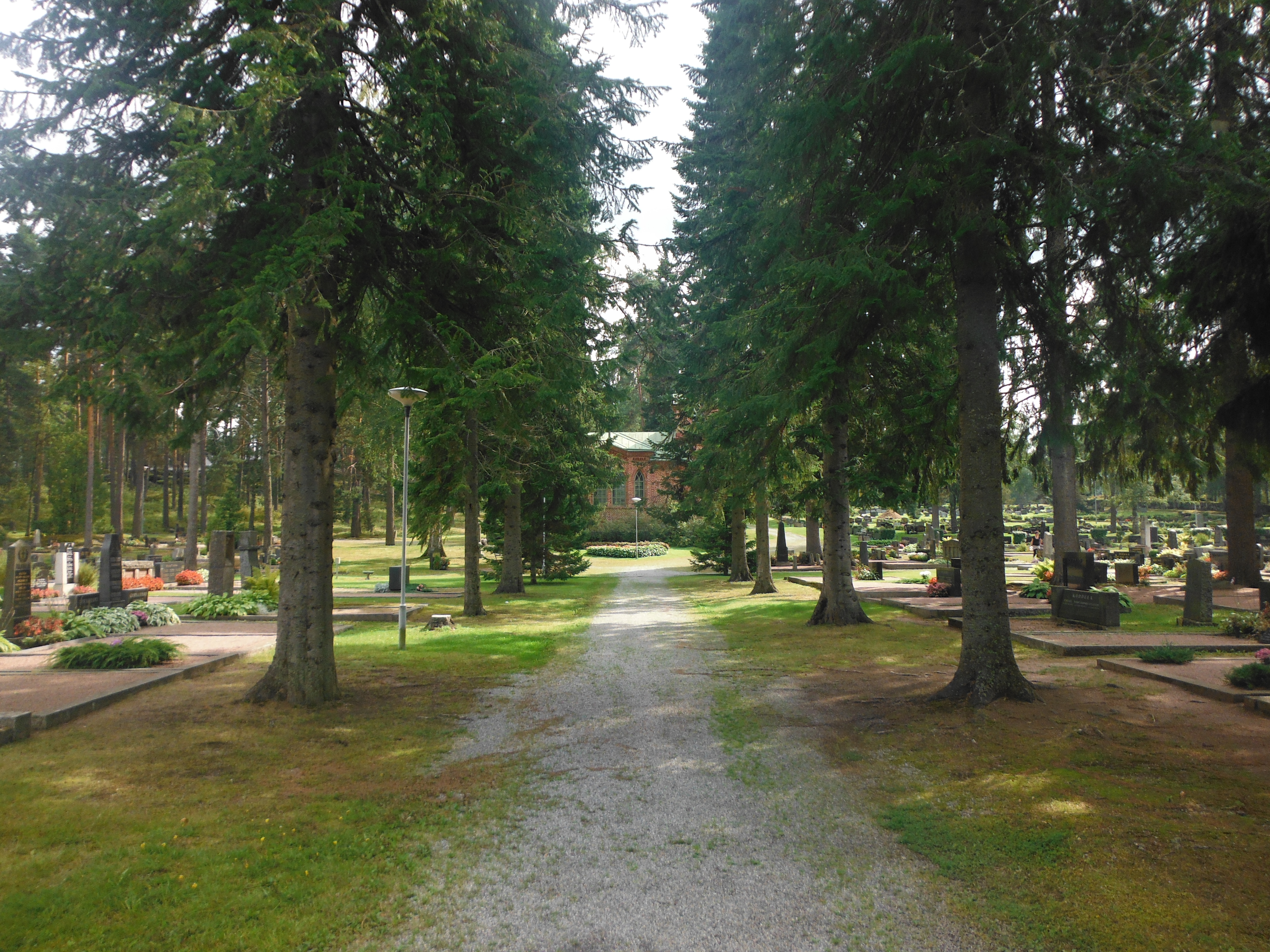
Old cemetery

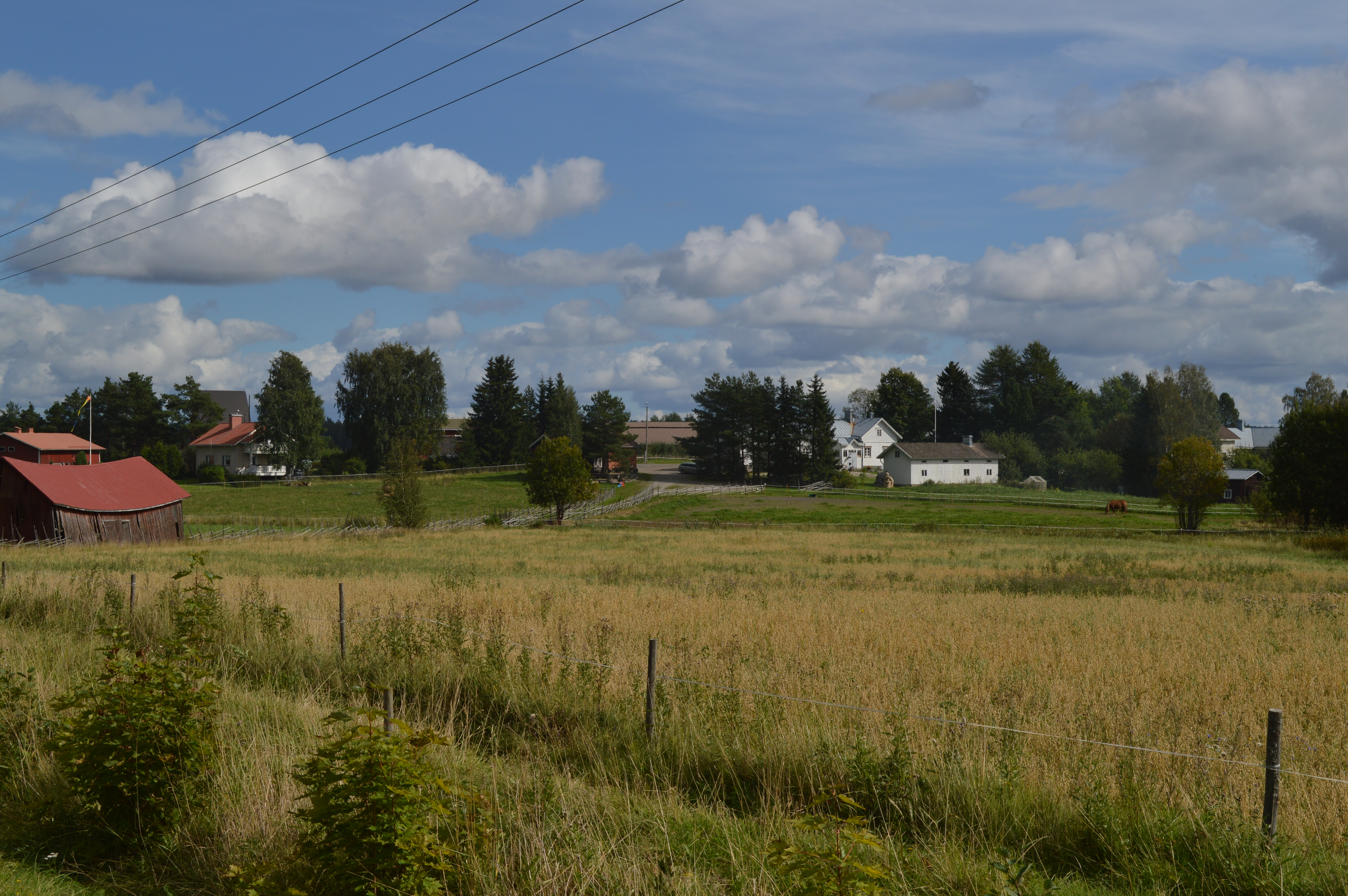
Kalliala's rural village and fields

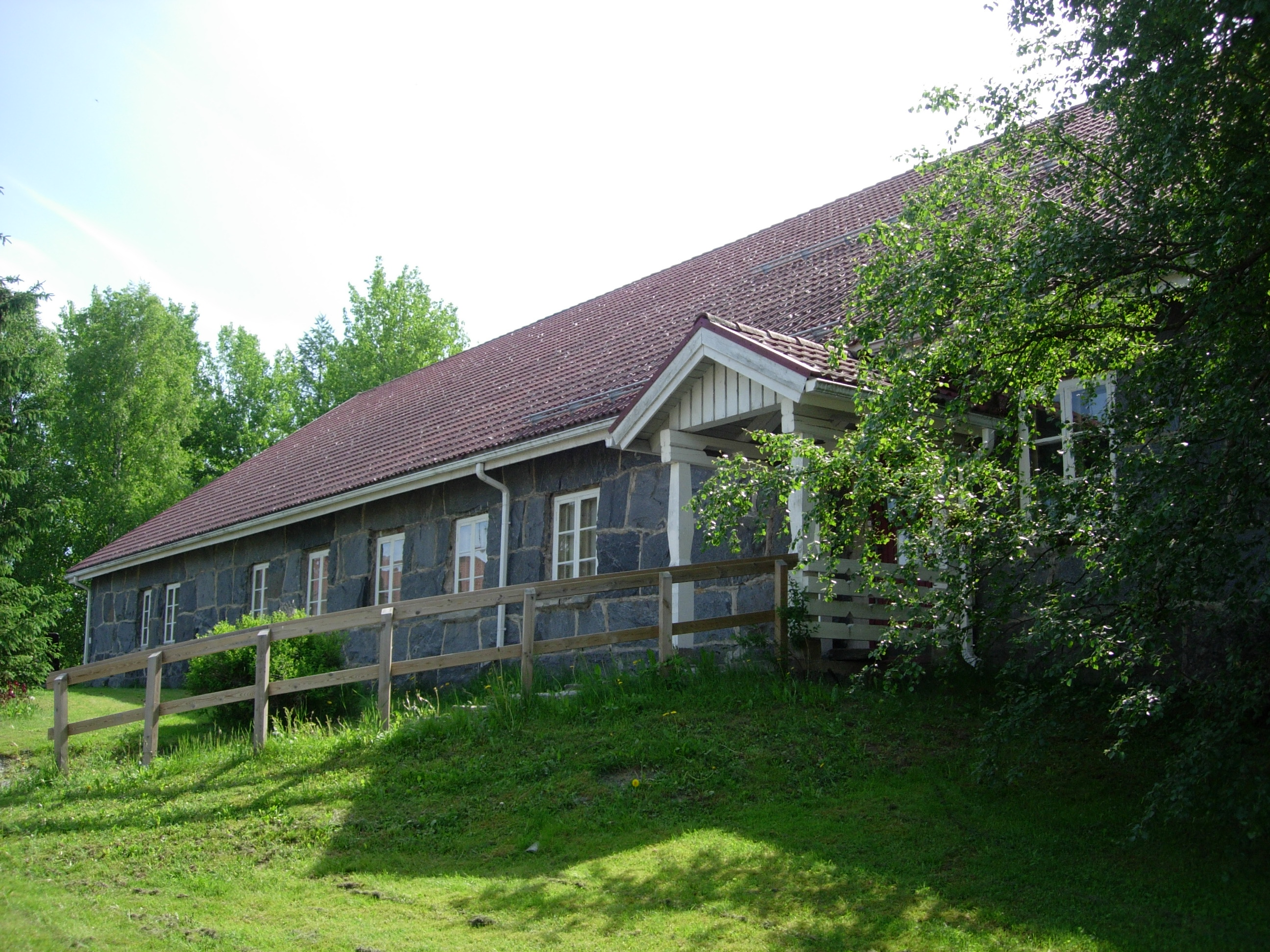
Tyrvää's local museum

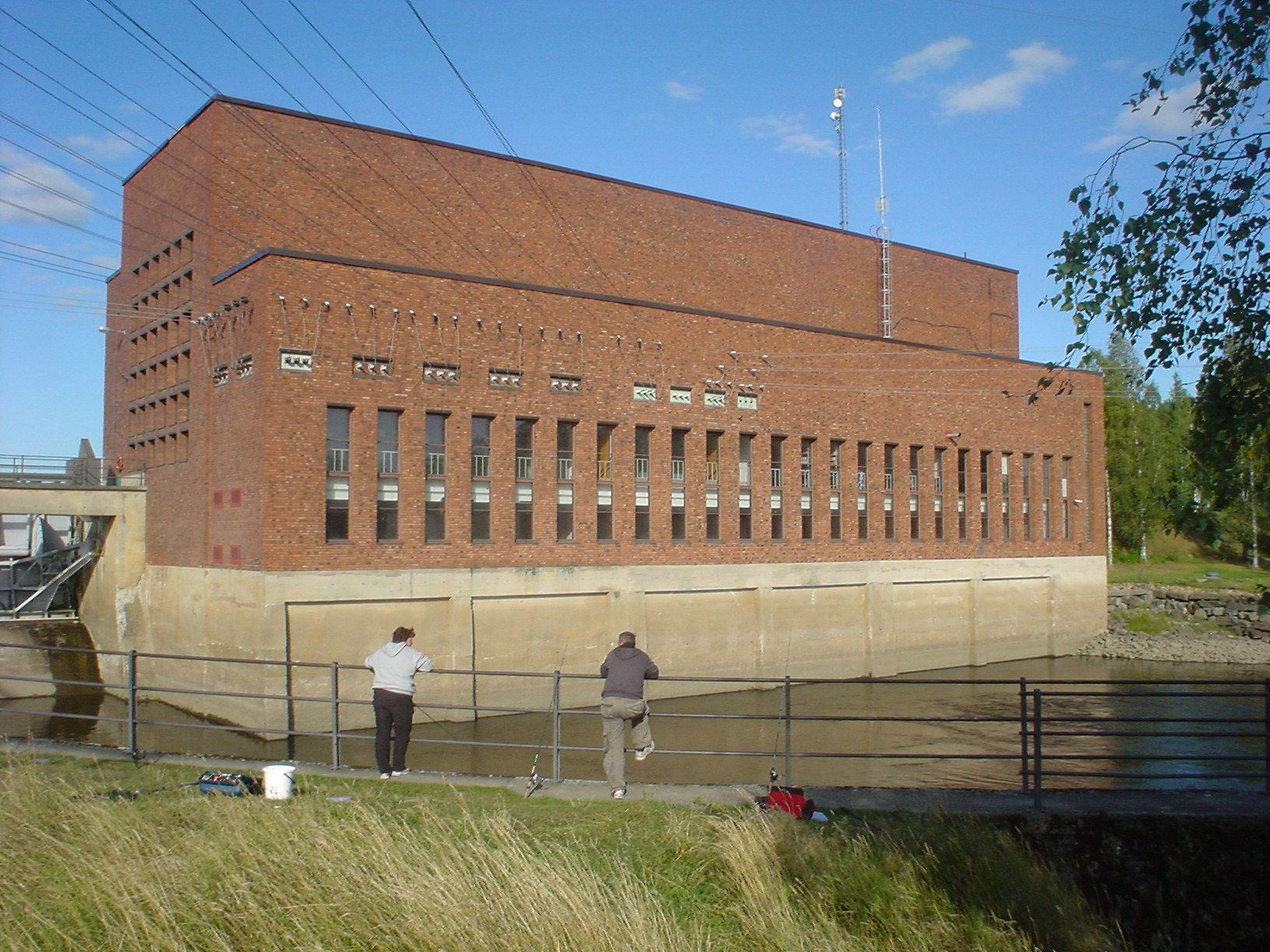
Tyrvää's hydroelectric power plant
