= Kyrösjärvi =

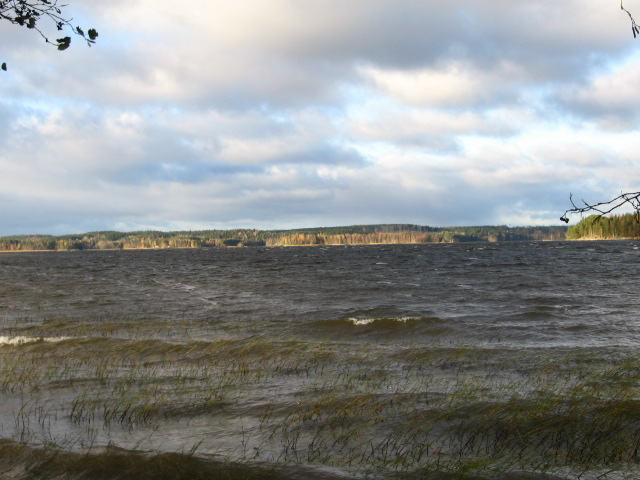

- Location within Finland
- Location: Ikaalinen, Hämeenkyrö, Ylöjärvi
- Coordinates: 61°47′N 023°06′E
- Type: Lake
- Catchment area: 2,626 km^{2} (1,014 sq mi)
- Basin countries: Finland
- Max. length: 36 km (22 mi)
- Max. width: 5 km (3.1 mi)
- Surface area: 96.066 km^{2} (37.091 sq mi)
- Average depth: 10.38 m (34.1 ft)
- Max. depth: 47 m (154 ft)
- Water volume: 0.998 km^{3} (809,000 acre⋅ft)
- Shore length^{1}: 353.45 km (219.62 mi)
- Surface elevation: 83.2 m (273 ft)
- Frozen: December–April
- Settlements: Ikaalinen, Hämeenkyrö, Viljakkala
- ^{1} Shore length is not a well-defined measure.

Kyrösjärvi is a medium-sized lake in Finland. It is situated in the municipalities of Ikaalinen, Hämeenkyrö and Ylöjärvi in the Pirkanmaa region in western Finland. The lake is part of the Kokemäenjoki basin and it drains through a chain of lakes into the lake Kulovesi in the south.

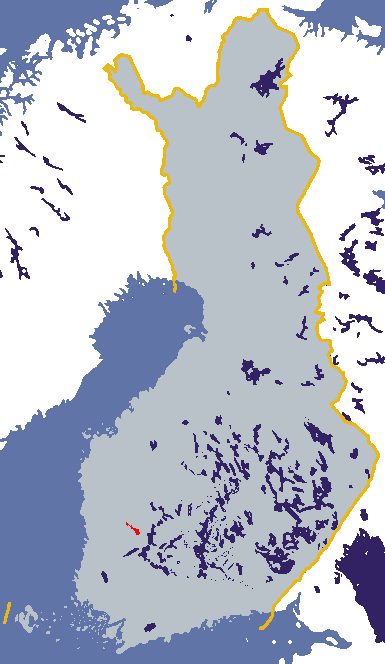
Location of Kyrösjärvi in Finland

== See also ==
- List of lakes in Finland
