= Kulovesi =

Lake in the country of Finland

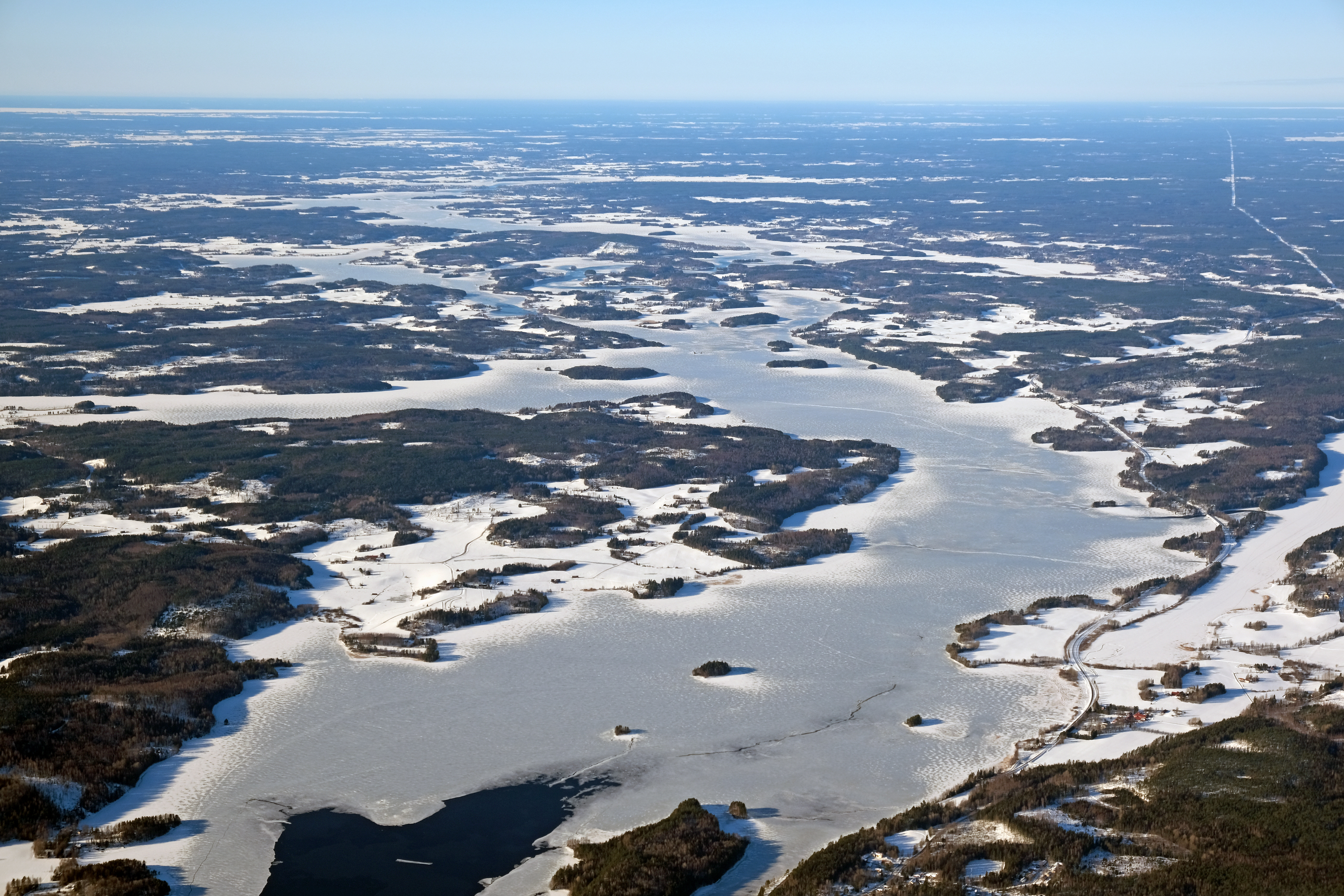

- Location within Finland
- Location: Nokia, Sastamala
- Coordinates: 61°27′N 23°12′E
- Primary inflows: Nokianvirta, Siuronkoski
- Primary outflows: Rautavesi
- Catchment area: 20,822 km^{2} (8,039 sq mi)
- Basin countries: Finland
- Surface area: 36.422 km^{2} (14.063 sq mi)
- Average depth: 7.14 m (23.4 ft)
- Max. depth: 36.6 m (120 ft)
- Water volume: 0.258 km^{3} (209,000 acre⋅ft)
- Shore length^{1}: 152.77 km (94.93 mi)
- Surface elevation: 57.5 m (189 ft)
- Frozen: December–April
- Islands: Latosaari, Urhattu
- Settlements: Nokia
- ^{1} Shore length is not a well-defined measure.

Kulovesi is a medium-sized lake in Finland. It is situated in the area of the towns Nokia and Sastamala in the Pirkanmaa region. The lake is part of the Kokemäenjoki basin. The lake Pyhäjärvi drains through the Nokianvirta River into the Lake Kulovesi from the west and the lake Kyrösjärvi through a chain of lakes (last one being Mahnalanselkä – Kirkkojärvi) and the Siuronkoski rapids from the north near the Siuro village. The lake gathers waters from an area of 20 822 km^{2} that includes the whole upper part of the Kokemäenjoki basin. Lake Kulovesi drains into the lake Rautavesi which in its turn drains into the lake Liekovesi and this finally into the Kokemäenjoki River.

== See also ==
- List of lakes in Finland
