= Pori railway station =

Railway station in Pori, Finland

Pori Björneborg
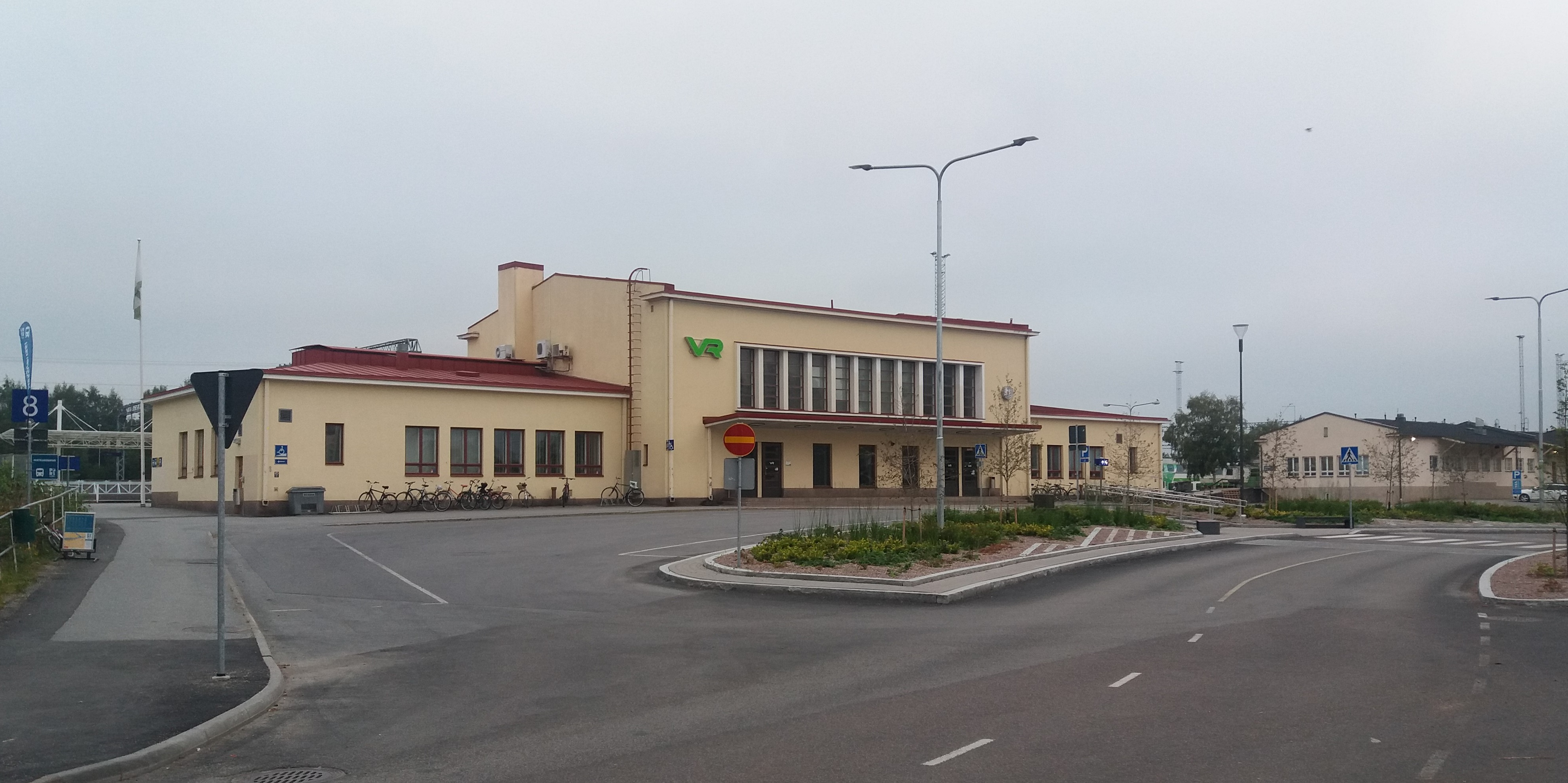

General information
- Location: Asema-aukio 3, 28100 Pori
- Coordinates: 61°28′38″N 021°47′15″E
- System: VR station
- Owner: Finnish Transport Agency
- Line: Tampere–Pori

Construction
- Structure type: ground station

History
- Opened: 1895
- Rebuilt: 1938
Location

Pori railway station (Finnish: Porin rautatieasema, Swedish: Björneborgs järnvägsstation) is a railway station in Pori, Finland. VR operates passenger service to Tampere. Pori railway station serves approximately 225,000 people annually.

== History ==
Tampere–Pori railway and the first railway station in Pori were opened in 1895. This station building was expanded in 1902, but was destroyed in the 1918 Finnish Civil War and replaced with a new one. The construction of the Haapamäki–Pori railway caused the station to be moved 1.4 km (0.87 mi) towards Tampere. The new functionalist building was designed by Finnish architect Thure Hellström and was opened in 1937.

The line to Haapamäki opened between 1933 and 1938, connecting Pori with Central Finland. Passenger traffic on the line was terminated in 1981, and the line section from Kankaanpää railway station to Pori was closed in 1985. Passenger traffic from Pori station onwards to Mäntyluoto was terminated in 1953, making Pori a terminus for passenger traffic.

== Departure tracks ==
Pori railway station has two platform tracks. Trains departing the station primarily use track 1.
