= Äetsä =

Former municipality of southwestern Finland

Coordinates: 61°17′05″N 022°41′50″E

Location of Äetsä in southwestern Finland

Coat of arms of Äetsä

Äetsä is a former municipality of southwestern Finland. The municipality was founded on 1981 when municipalities of Keikyä and Kiikka were consolidated to a single municipality.

On 1 January 2009, it was consolidated with the municipalities of Vammala and Mouhijärvi to form a new city of Sastamala.

== Geography ==
Äetsä was located in the western Pirkanmaa region, and was part of the former (1997 to 2010) province of Western Finland.

Demographics

The municipality had a population of 4,797 (November 30, 2008) and covered an area of 241.95 square kilometres (93.42 sq mi), of which 8.38 km^{2} (3.24 sq mi) was water. The population density was 20.54 inhabitants per square kilometre (53.2/sq mi).

The municipality was unilingually Finnish.
