= Mouhijärvi =

Former municipality of Finland

Coordinates: 61°30′45″N 23°00′30″E

Location of Mouhijärvi in southwestern Finland.

Coat of arms of Mouhijärvi.

Mouhijärvi is a former municipality of Finland, located in the southwestern part of the country. It was an agricultural village since the 18th century.

On 1 January in 2009 Mouhijärvi was consolidated with the municipalities of Vammala and Äetsä, to form a new town named Sastamala.

== Geography ==
Mouhijärvi was located in the southwest Pirkanmaa region, and was part of the former provinces of Turku and Pori Province (1917 to 1997) and Western Finland Province (1997 to 2010). The location is between the shores of Mätikkö and Siilijärvi lakes and covered an area of 268.65 square kilometres (103.73 sq mi), of which 14.48 square kilometres (5.59 sq mi) was water.

== Demographics ==
The municipality had a population of 2,961 (2003). The population density was 11.0 inhabitants per 1 square kilometre (0.39 sq mi).

The municipality was unilingually Finnish.

History

Mouhijärvi was notable for being the first municipality in Finland to have an all-female city council — in 1988.

== People born in Mouhijärvi ==
- Emil Viljanen (1874 – 1954)
- Markku Aro (1950 – )

== See also ==
- South Western Pirkanmaa
