= Sastamala =

- Town
- Sastamalan kaupunki Sastamala stad
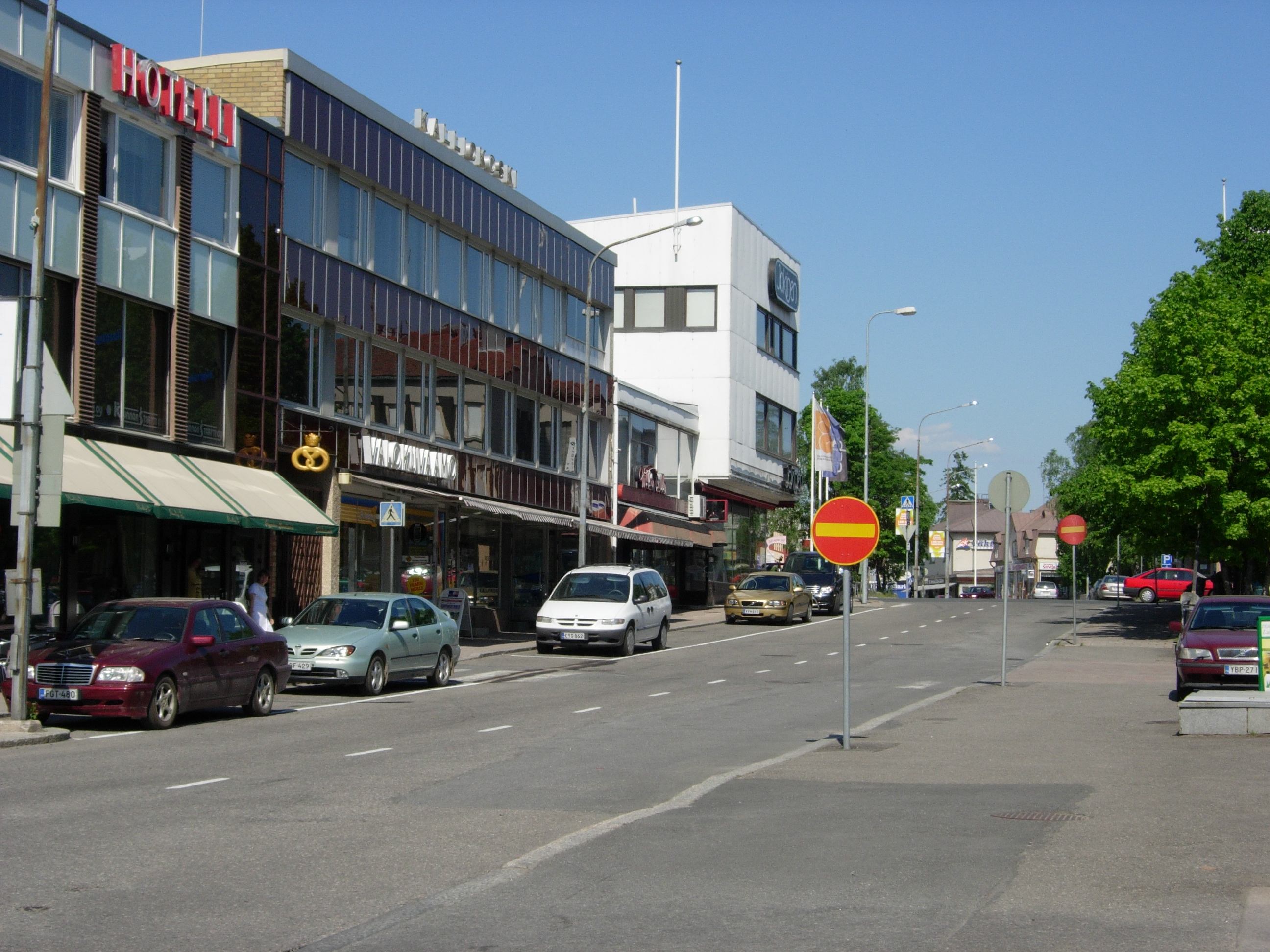
- Onkiniemenkatu in Vammala, an administrative centre of Sastamala.

- Coat of arms
- Nickname: Book Capital of Finland
- Location of Sastamala in Finland
- Interactive map of Sastamala
- Coordinates: 61°20.5′N 022°54.5′E
- Country: Finland
- Region: Pirkanmaa
- Sub-region: South Western Pirkanmaa
- Charter: 2009
- Seat: Vammala

Government
  - Town manager: Jarkko Malmberg

Area (2018-01-01)
  - Total: 1,531.75 km^{2} (591.41 sq mi)
  - Land: 1,429.12 km^{2} (551.79 sq mi)
  - Water: 96.14 km^{2} (37.12 sq mi)
  - Rank: 49th largest in Finland

Population (2025-12-31)
  - Total: 23,332
  - Rank: 44th largest in Finland
  - Density: 16.33/km^{2} (42.3/sq mi)

Population by native language
  - Finnish: 95.8% (official)
  - Swedish: 0.2%
  - Others: 3.9%

Population by age
  - 0 to 14: 14.3%
  - 15 to 64: 55.5%
  - 65 or older: 30.2%
- Time zone: UTC+02:00 (EET)
  - Summer (DST): UTC+03:00 (EEST)
- Website: sastamala.fi

Sastamala (Finnish pronunciation: [ˈsɑstɑˌmɑlɑ]) is a town in Finland, located in the Pirkanmaa region. Sastamala lies on both sides of River Kokemäenjoki in the southwest corner of Pirkanmaa. The population of Sastamala is approximately 23,000, while the sub-region has a population of approximately 26,000. It is the 44th most populous municipality in Finland.

Sastamala has an area of 1,531.75 square kilometres (591.41 sq mi) of which 96.14 km^{2} (37.12 sq mi) is water, making it the largest municipality in the Pirkanmaa region in terms of area. The population density is 16.33 inhabitants per square kilometre (42.3/sq mi). The municipality is officially unilingual in Finnish.

Sastamala was created in 2009 when the municipalities of Vammala, Äetsä and Mouhijärvi were merged into a single town. Later, in 2013, Kiikoinen also joined Sastamala. Today, its neighbouring municipalities are Huittinen, Hämeenkyrö, Ikaalinen, Kankaanpää, Kokemäki, Lavia, Nokia, Punkalaidun, Ulvila, Urjala and Vesilahti. The city of Tampere is 51 kilometres (32 mi) from Sastamala. The administrative centre of Sastamala is Vammala, which had a population of about 10,000 in the 2011 census.

Two highways pass through Sastamala: Highway 11 between Pori and Nokia, and Highway 12 between Rauma and Kouvola.

== Heraldry ==
The coat of arms of Sastamala is the former coat of arms of the now defunct municipality of Karkku, originally approved by the Karkku municipal council on November 26, 1962, and approved for use by the Ministry of the Interior on February 12, 1963. The coat of arms refers to the 14th century St. Mary Church of Sastamala. The explanation of the coat of arms is “in the blue field, a golden consecration cross with a crossed edge”. The coat of arms was designed by Lauri Ahlgrén.

== History ==
The stone grave with its swords, dating to the 4th century in Ristimäki, Vammala, is reminiscent of the prosperous armed burials of the younger Roman Iron Age (200–400 AD) in coastal areas. It is also the only inland tomb corresponding to the coastal burial tradition at that time. During the Vendel Period, cemeteries became more common in the Sastamala area, which contributes to population growth and population density. The parish of Sastamala was the largest parish belonging to the historical province of Satakunta.

The name Sastamala first appeared in the form Sastamall in a letter from King Birger Magnusson from 1300 or 1303.

== Geography ==
Sastamala is located on both sides of the Kokemäki River's watershed in the southwest corner of Pirkanmaa. The municipality is divided by Kokemäki River, Lake Liekovesi, Lake Rautavesi and Lake Kulovesi. Other significant severe waters in the municipality are Lake Houha, Lake Ylinen, Lake Kiikoinen and Lake Mouhijärvi.

There are a total of 161 villages in Sastamala, and two thirds of the municipality's population lives in rural areas and villages. The villages are organized into more than 40 village associations. The division of the village was created by the Great Partition in the 18th century and thus does not fully correspond to the current situation; for example, Illo and Putaja are located on the lands of other villages and are not listed.

== Economy ==
In 2015, the municipality had 8,426 jobs. Of these, 8,5% were in primary production (agriculture, forestry and fisheries), 63% in services and 27% in processing. The share of the unemployed in the labor force was 9.1% (2024). The largest corporate tax is paid by the building design company Partnos, the manufacturer of rubber and plastic products Teknikum and the manufacturer of district heating reed valves.

== Culture ==
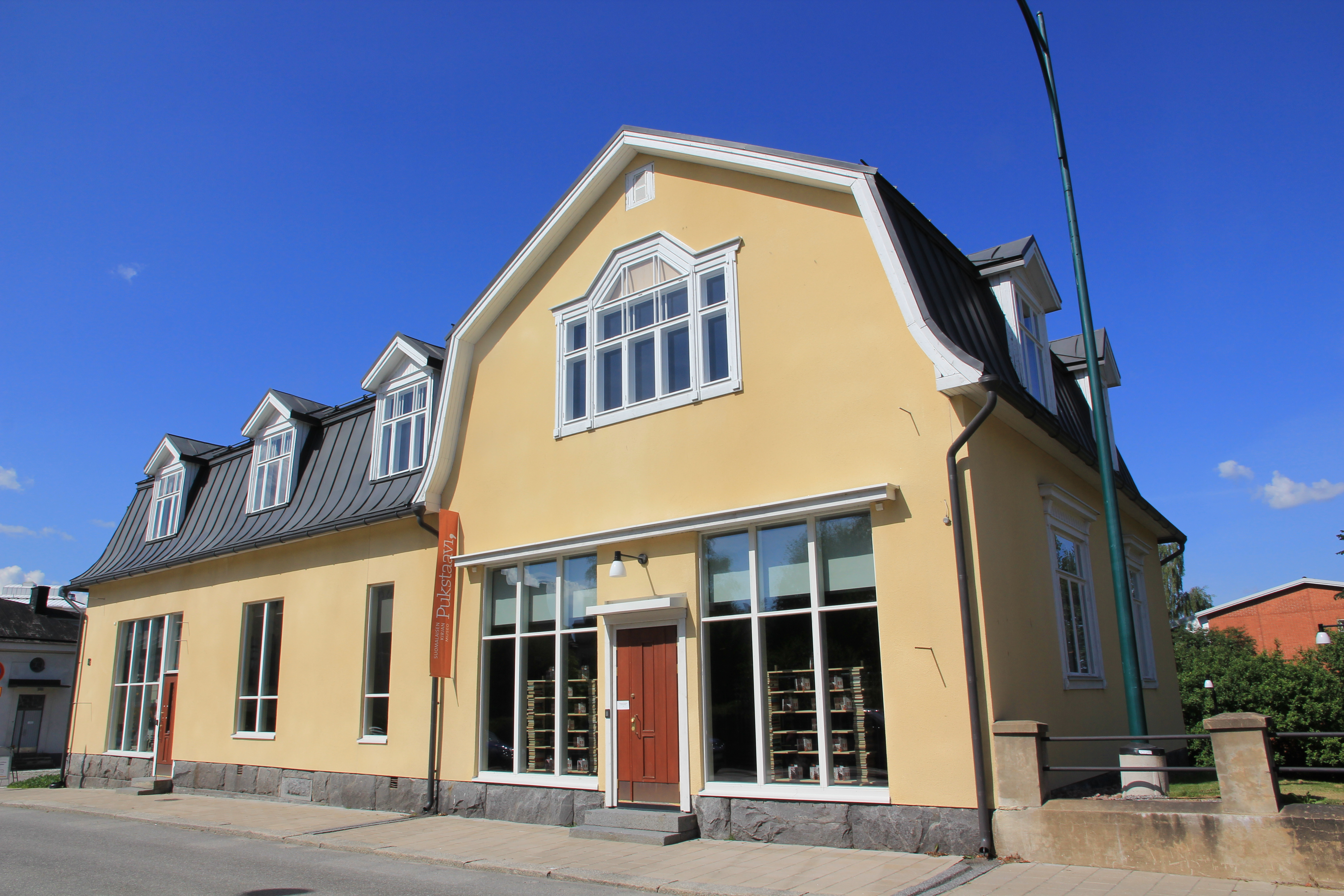
Pukstaavi, the museum of the Finnish books in Vammala, Sastamala

Sastamala has a long tradition in literature. One of the biggest themed events is the Old Literature Days (Vanhan kirjallisuuden päivät) in the town center during the summer. In July 2011, the Finnish Book Museum Pukstaavi was also opened in Sastamala, which promotes Finnish book culture and reading. Pukstaavi is a national museum that tells the popular story of a Finnish book on cultural history and social significance. At the beginning of 2013, the town of Sastamala was declared the "book capital of Finland".

=== Sights and happenings ===
- Vanhan kirjallisuuden päivät, book festival
- Sastamala Gregoriana, early music festival
- Skicenter Ellivuori
- Pirunvuori ("Devil's Mountain")
- St. Olaf's Church
- Herra Hakkaraisen talo
- Culturehouse Jaatsi
- Lakeside Golf Vammala
- Sarkia museum
- Keikyä museum
- Kokemäki River

== Demographics ==
Population size 1990–2025
Year	Population
1990	27,085
1995	26,785
2000	26,195
2005	25,847
2010	25,764
2015	25,220
2020	24,052
2025	23,332

== Sports ==
VaLePa (or Vammalan Lentopallo) is a volleyball club founded in 1978 in Vammala, Sastamala, whose representative team plays in the Finland Volleyball League. The six Finnish championships won by VaLePa will take place in 2012, 2014, 2017, 2018, 2019 and 2021. VaLePa has won the Finnish Championship silver in 2011 and 2016 and the Fourth Championship bronze in 1992, 2008, 2013 and 2015.

== International relations ==
=== Twin towns — Sister cities ===
Sastamala is twinned with:

- Skövde, Sweden
- Ringsted, Denmark
- Halden, Norway
- Kashin, Russia
- Kuressaare, Estonia
- Vásárosnamény, Hungary
- (Republic of Ireland) Dunboyne, Ireland

== See also ==
- Karkku
- Kiikka
- Suodenniemi
- Tyrvää

== Sources ==
=== Literature ===
- Georg Haggrén, Petri Halinen, Mika Lavento, Sami Raninen & Anna Wessman (2015). Muinaisuutemme jäljet (in Finnish). Gaudeamus.
