= Rautavesi (Sastamala) =

Lake in the country of Finland

Rautavesi-Liekovesi
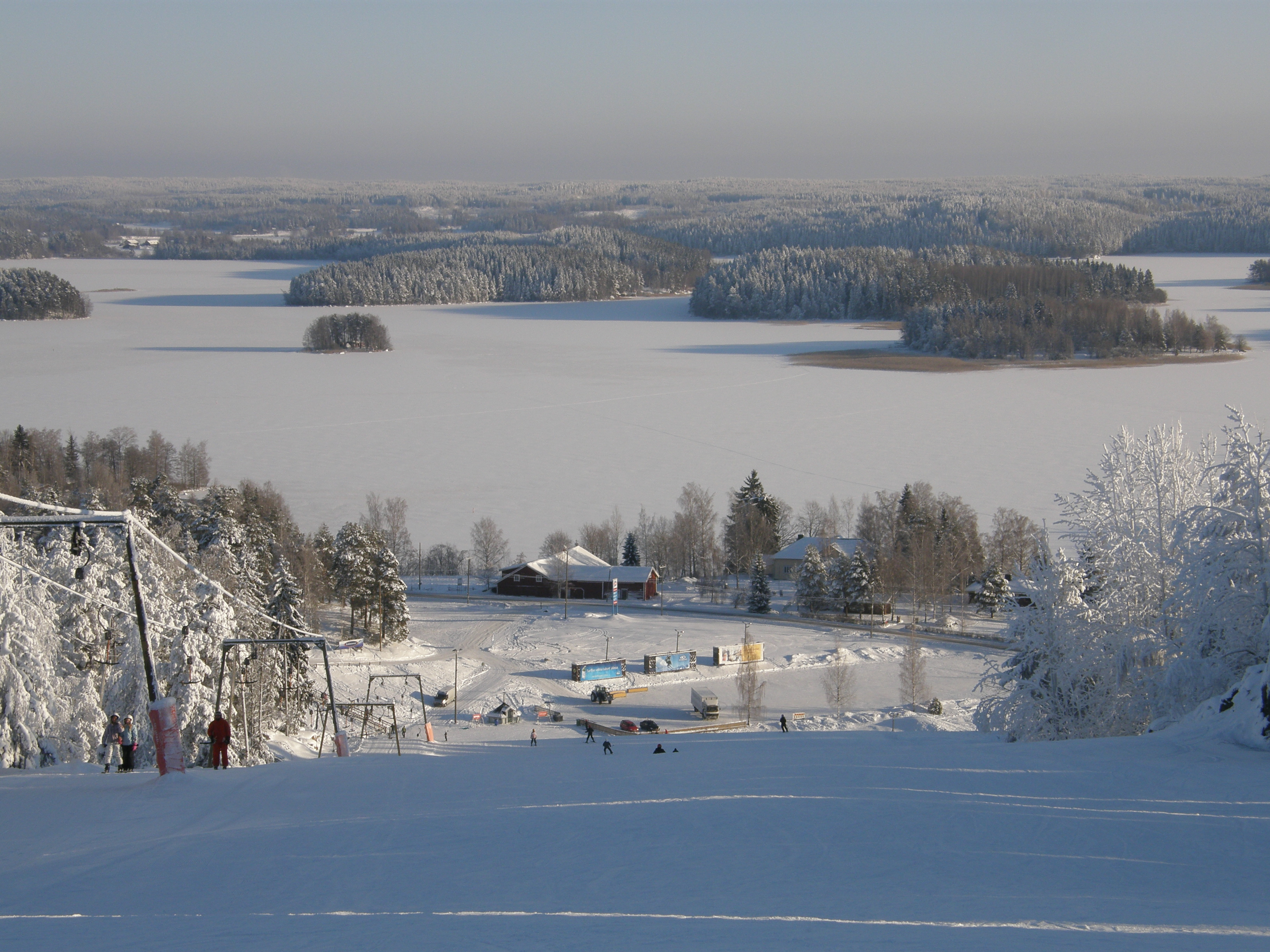

- Location within Finland
- Location: Sastamala
- Coordinates: 61°23′N 23°01′E
- Lake type: Natural
- Catchment area: Kokemäenjoki
- Basin countries: Finland
- Surface area: 30.28 km^{2} (11.69 sq mi)
- Average depth: 4.96 m (16.3 ft)
- Max. depth: 26.32 m (86.4 ft)
- Water volume: 0.15 km^{3} (0.036 cu mi)
- Shore length^{1}: 111.94 km (69.56 mi)
- Surface elevation: 57.5 m (189 ft)
- Frozen: December–April
- Islands: Salonsaari, Kutalansaari
- Settlements: Vammala
- ^{1} Shore length is not a well-defined measure.

Rautavesi is a medium-sized lake in Finland. It is located in the municipality of Sastamala in the Pirkanmaa region in western Finland. Its main inflow is the lake Kulovesi in the east and it drains into the lake Liekovesi through the Vammaskoski rapids in the west. Lake Liekovesi, in its turn drains into the Kokemäenjoki river.

== See also ==
- List of lakes in Finland
