= Vammala =

- Former town and municipality
- Vammalan kaupunki Vammala stad
- Coat of arms

- Location of Vammala in Finland
- Coordinates: 61°20.5′N 022°54.5′E
- Country: Finland
- Region: Pirkanmaa
- Sub-region: South Western Pirkanmaa sub-region
- Charter: 1907
- Consolidated: 2009

Area
  - Total: 876 km^{2} (338 sq mi)
  - Land: 803.87 km^{2} (310.38 sq mi)
  - Water: 72.13 km^{2} (27.85 sq mi)

Population (2008-12-31)
  - Total: 16,635
  - Density: 20.694/km^{2} (53.596/sq mi)

Population by age
  - 0 to 14: 16.8%
  - 15 to 64: 61.6%
  - 65 or older: 21.6%
- Time zone: UTC+2 (EET)
  - Summer (DST): UTC+3 (EEST)

Vammala is a former town and municipality of southwestern Finland, chartered in 1907. On 1 January 2009, Vammala was consolidated with the municipalities of Mouhijärvi and Äetsä, to form a new city named Sastamala.

== Geography ==
Vammala was located in the southwest Pirkanmaa region, and was part of the former (1997 to 2010) province of Western Finland.

Demographics

The municipality had a population of 16,635 (31 December 2008) and covered a land area of 803.87 square kilometres (310.38 sq mi). The population density was 20.29 inhabitants per square kilometre (52.6/sq mi).

The municipality was unilingually Finnish.

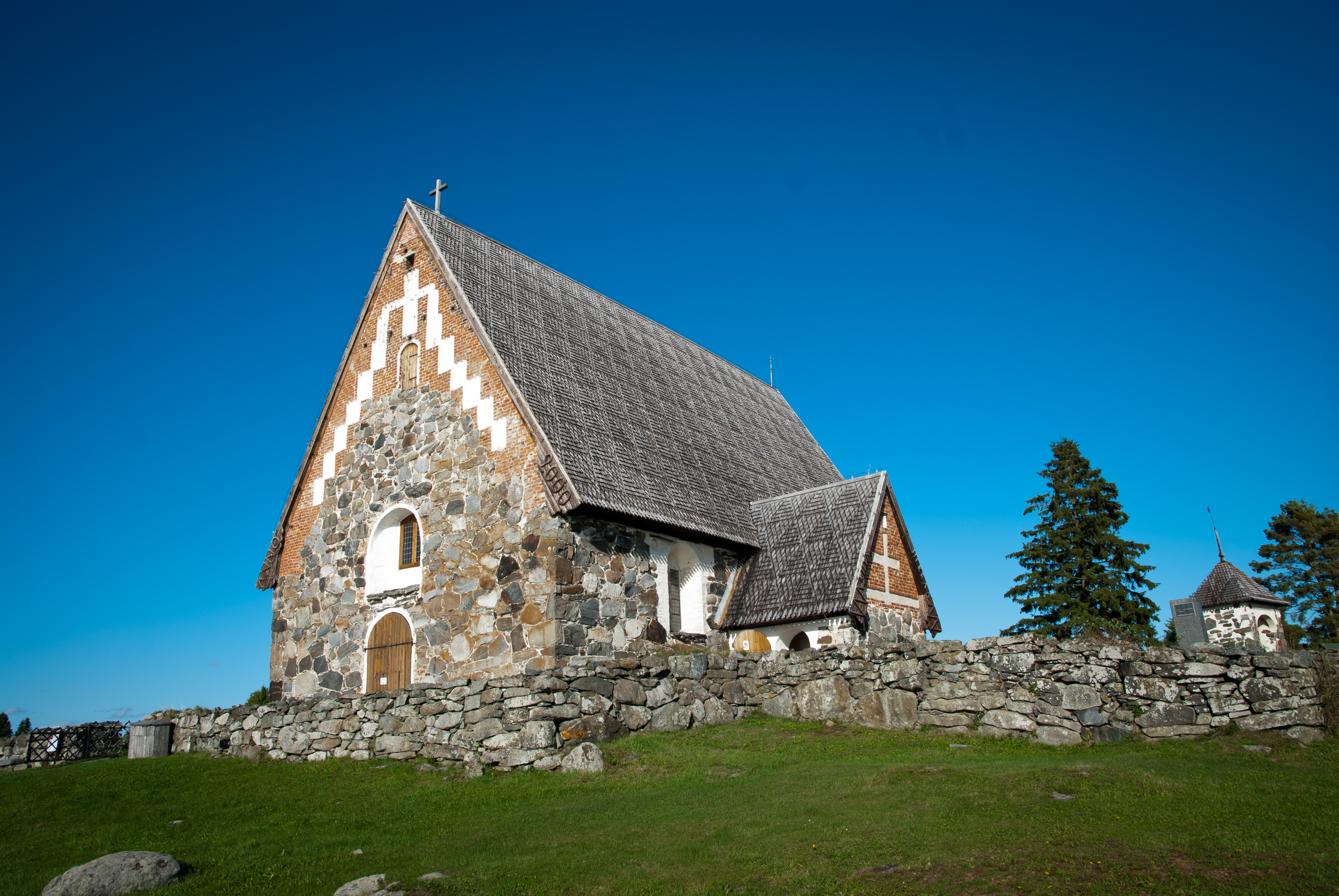
St. Olaf's Church in Tyrvää, near Vammala.

== See also ==
- St. Olaf's Church in Tyrvää
