= Nokia Arena =

Nokia Arena may refer to:

- Nokia Arena in Tampere, Finland
- Nokia Arena, Tel Aviv now known as Menora Mivtachim Arena in Tel Aviv, Israel

== See also ==
- Nokia Theater (disambiguation)
- Nokia (disambiguation)
