= Nokian =

Nokian may refer to:

- Nokian Tyres
- Nokian Footwear
