= Nokia (disambiguation) =

Nokia is a Finnish telecommunications corporation.

Nokia may also refer to:

== Companies ==
- Nokia Networks, a subsidiary of Nokia Corporation
- Nokian Tyres (Nokian Renkaat), a Finnish manufacturer of tyres split from Nokia Corporation in 1988
- Nokian Footwear (Nokian Jalkineet), a Finnish manufacturer of footwear split from Nokia Corporation in 1990
- Microsoft Mobile, Microsoft smartphone subsidiary created from Nokia's mobile phone division that once handled "Nokia" and "Nokia Lumia"-branded phones
- HMD Global, cellphone company that handles "Nokia" and "Nokia Mobile" branded phones

== Places ==
- Nokia, Finland, a town in Finland
- Nokia railway station, a railway station in Nokia town

== People ==
- noki-A (born 1973), Japanese professional wrestler
- Princess Nokia (born 1992), American rapper

== Other uses ==
- 1999 Nokia Cup, tennis tournament
- Nokia tune, a popular mobile ringtone
- Nokia (yacht), a yacht
- Mr. Nokia, a 2012 Indian film
- "Nokia" (song), a 2025 song by Drake

== See also ==
- Nokia Revival, a Christian movement
- Nokianvirta, a river in Finland
