= Elsa Rautee =

Finnish poet

Elsa Elina Rautee (February 7, 1897 Tottijärvi – February 15, 1987 Nokia) was a Finnish poet of the labor movement who wrote the lyrics in the 1930s to the song "Brother Sister (Veli Sisko)". The song is an anti-war song written after the Spanish Civil War.

== Books ==
- ISBN 978-951-615-073-7
