= Suoniemi, Finland =

Suoniemi
- Former municipality
- Suoniemen kunta Suoniemi kommun
- Coat of arms

- Location of Suoniemi in Finland
- Coordinates: 61°26′28″N 023°12′54″E
- Country: Finland
- Province: Turku and Pori Province
- Region: Pirkanmaa
- Merged into Nokia: 1973
- Seat: Siuro

Area
  - Land: 88.9 km^{2} (34.3 sq mi)

Population (1972-12-31)
  - Total: 1,544

Suoniemi (Finnish pronunciation: [ˈsuo̯ˌnie̯mi]) is a former municipality of Finland in the former Turku and Pori Province, nowadays in the Pirkanmaa region. It was consolidated with Nokia in 1973, which was located in the Häme Province at the time.

Its seat was in the western side of Siuro, the eastern side of which was already located within Nokia. The church was located in the village of Suoniemi.

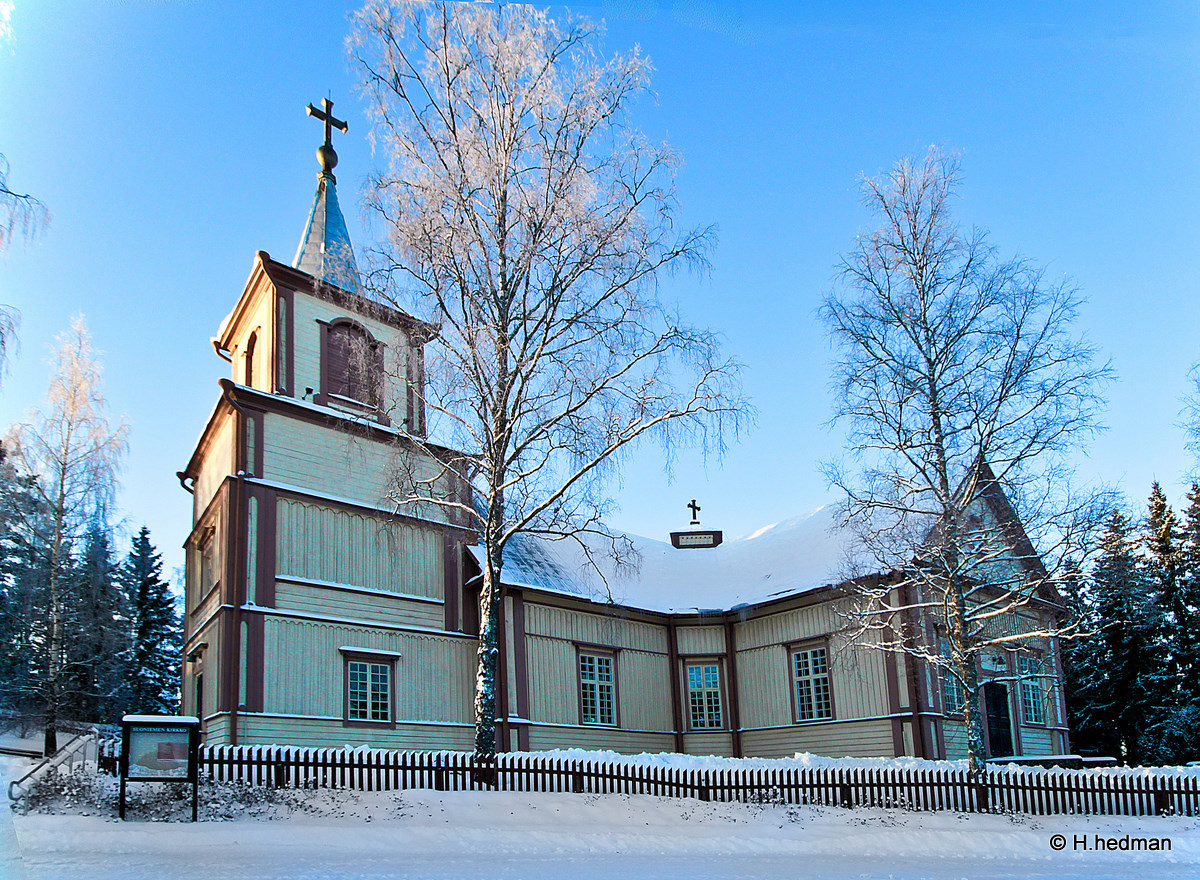
Suoniemi Church

== Geography ==
=== Neighboring municipalities ===
The municipality of Suoniemi bordered Nokia, Tottijärvi, Karkku, Mouhijärvi and Hämeenkyrö.

=== Villages ===
- Kauniainen
- Kulju
- Mauri
- Pakkala
- Ruolahti
- Sarkola
- Suoniemi (location of the church)
- Tyrisevä (transferred to Karkku in 1972)
- Urmia
- Vahalahti

=== Lakes ===
The lake Kulovesi was mostly located within the municipality. It separated the municipality into two sides.

== History ==
Municipal border changes around Nokia, including Suoniemi.

The village of Kulju was mentioned already in 1478, while Tyrisevä was first mentioned in 1562.

Suoniemi itself was first mentioned in 1677. The area's original center was the village of Suoniemi itself, the name of which literally means "swamp cape/peninsula", despite the lack of swamps around the village. The area was originally part of the Karkku parish, gaining chapel rights under it in 1693. The chapel community was to be disestablished in 1863, which never came into effect and the order was repealed in 1893. Suoniemi became a separate parish in 1908.

The Kulju manor has existed since the 17th century, however the modern building was mainly built in the 18th century. Siuro was originally a tenure farm of the Kulju manor, first mentioned in 1683. The Reposaari sawmill was built next to the Siuronkoski rapids in 1895. The sawmill was acquired by the Anton Elving, the owner of the Kulju manor in 1908. The modern built-up area of Siuro eventually grew into an industrial area between the two municipalities of Suoniemi and Nokia.

Suoniemi was merged into Nokia in 1973.
