= Siuro railway station =

Railway station in Nokia, Finland

Siuro
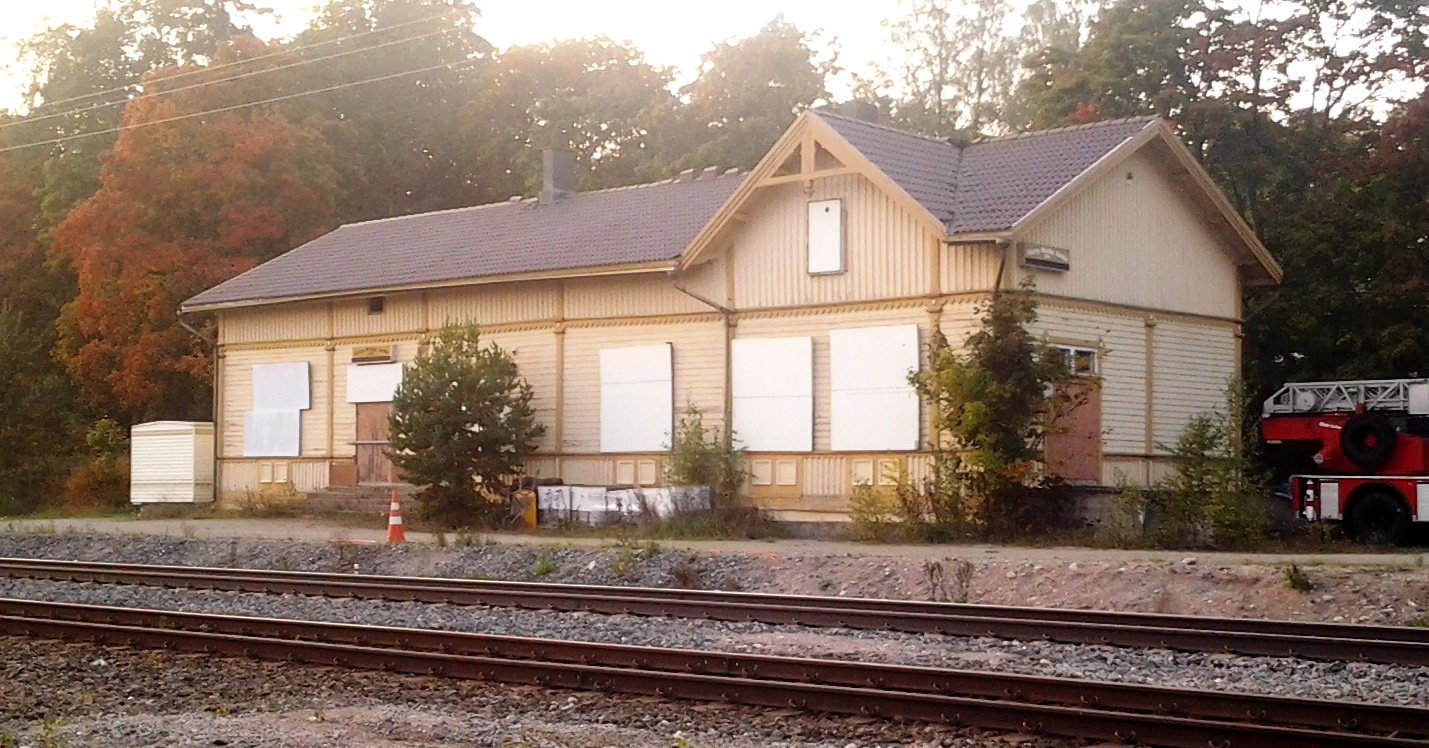
- Siuro in 2014

General information
- Location: Siuro, Nokia; Finland
- Coordinates: 61°28′28.7″N 23°20′21.7″E
- System: Closed VR station
- Operator: VR Group
- Line: Tampere–Pori
- Tracks: 2

Other information
- Station code: Siu
- Classification: Operating point

History
- Opened: 4 November 1895
- Closed: 28 May 1989 (passenger transport); 2002 (freight services)
Location

The Siuro railway station (Finnish: Siuron rautatieasema, Swedish: Siuro järnvägsstation) is located in the village and urban area of Siuro in the town of Nokia, Finland. It is located along the Tampere–Pori railway, and its nearest open stations are Nokia in the east and Karkku in the west.

The Finnish Heritage Agency has proclaimed the Siuro station as a built cultural environment of national significance.

== History ==
Siuro is one of the original stations of the Tampere–Pori railway, being opened on 4 November 1895. Its location was chosen based on its proximity to the Siuronkoski rapids, as the large lake of Mahnalanselkä – Kirkkojärvi was used as a waterborne route towards Hämeenkyrö. This factor helped Siuro grow into a significant industrial population center in its area.

The bridge crossing the Siuronkoski was destroyed during the Finnish Civil War on 27 March 1918.

Trains ceased to stop in Siuro on 28 May 1989, and freight transport at the station ended in 2002. The station's rail yard remains in regular use as a passing loop.

== Architecture ==
The station building in Siuro was constructed according to the stock blueprints for the smaller pysäkki stations on the Seinäjoki–Oulu railway. It was expanded in 1900 with a wall dormer, and in 1920–1922, a pair of extra wings were built on both sides. They were dismantled upon the renovation of the station in 1985.

== Future ==
The town of Nokia is aiming to reopen the Siuro station as a Tampere commuter rail station. The town's goals include the execution of a detailed study on the construction process of the station in 2028–2031. A preemptive study commissioned by the town from Ramboll Finland Oy estimates the costs at about €500,000 to €2,000,000.
