= Suoniemi =

Suoniemi may refer to:

- Suoniemi, Finland, village and former municipality
- Kalevi Suoniemi, Finnish gymnast
