= Sami Sandell =

Finnish ice hockey player

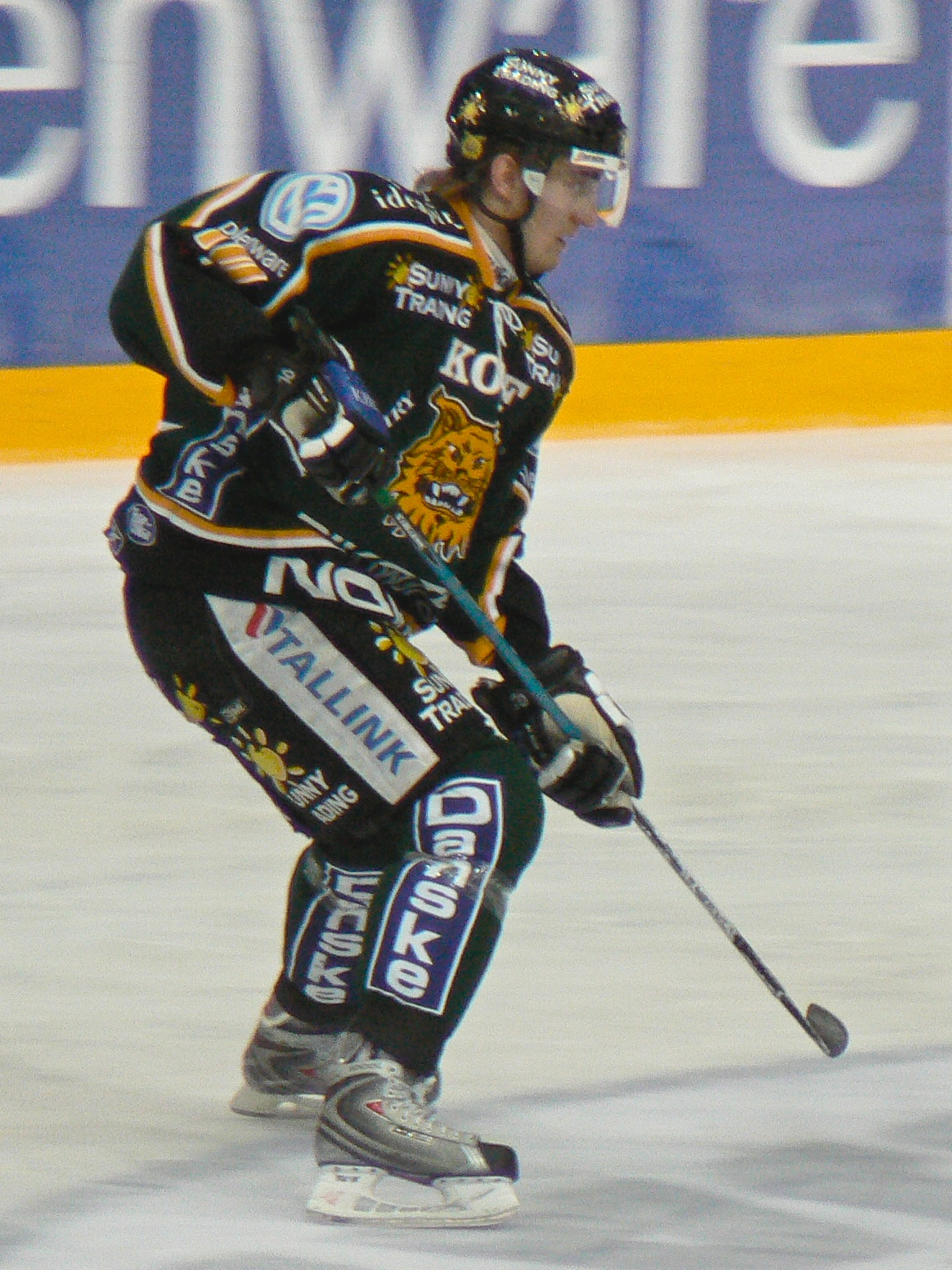
- Sandell with Ilves in 2007
- Born: March 1, 1987 (age 38) Nokia, Finland
- Height: 6 ft 1 in (185 cm)
- Weight: 181 lb (82 kg; 12 st 13 lb)
- Position: Left wing
- Shot: Left
- Played for: Ilves; Espoo Blues; IF Troja-Ljungby; Luleå HF; HC Davos
- NHL draft: Undrafted
- Playing career: 2006–2019

Sami-Petteri Sandell (born March 1, 1987) is a Finnish former professional ice hockey player who is currently playing for HC Davos of the National League (NL). He previously played for Ilves Tampere of the Finnish League. In the middle of his third season with Ilves in 2008–2009, Sandell was transferred to Espoo Blues in exchange for Matti Uusivirta in October 2008. He also represented the team in the Champions League during the season. After the season, Sandell was a free agent until September 2009, when he began the 2009–2010 season on a match-by-match contract with the Mestis team Lempäälän Kisa. Sandell played 17 matches there and one SM-liiga match on loan with Ilves, until he transferred to Sweden's second highest league level HockeyAllsvenskan team IF Troja-Ljungby for the rest of the season in December 2009.

Sandell joined Davos in July 2018 on a tryout, before officially joining the team on a one-year deal worth CHF 550,000 on August 17, 2018.
