= Kuuma koira =

Finnish fast food

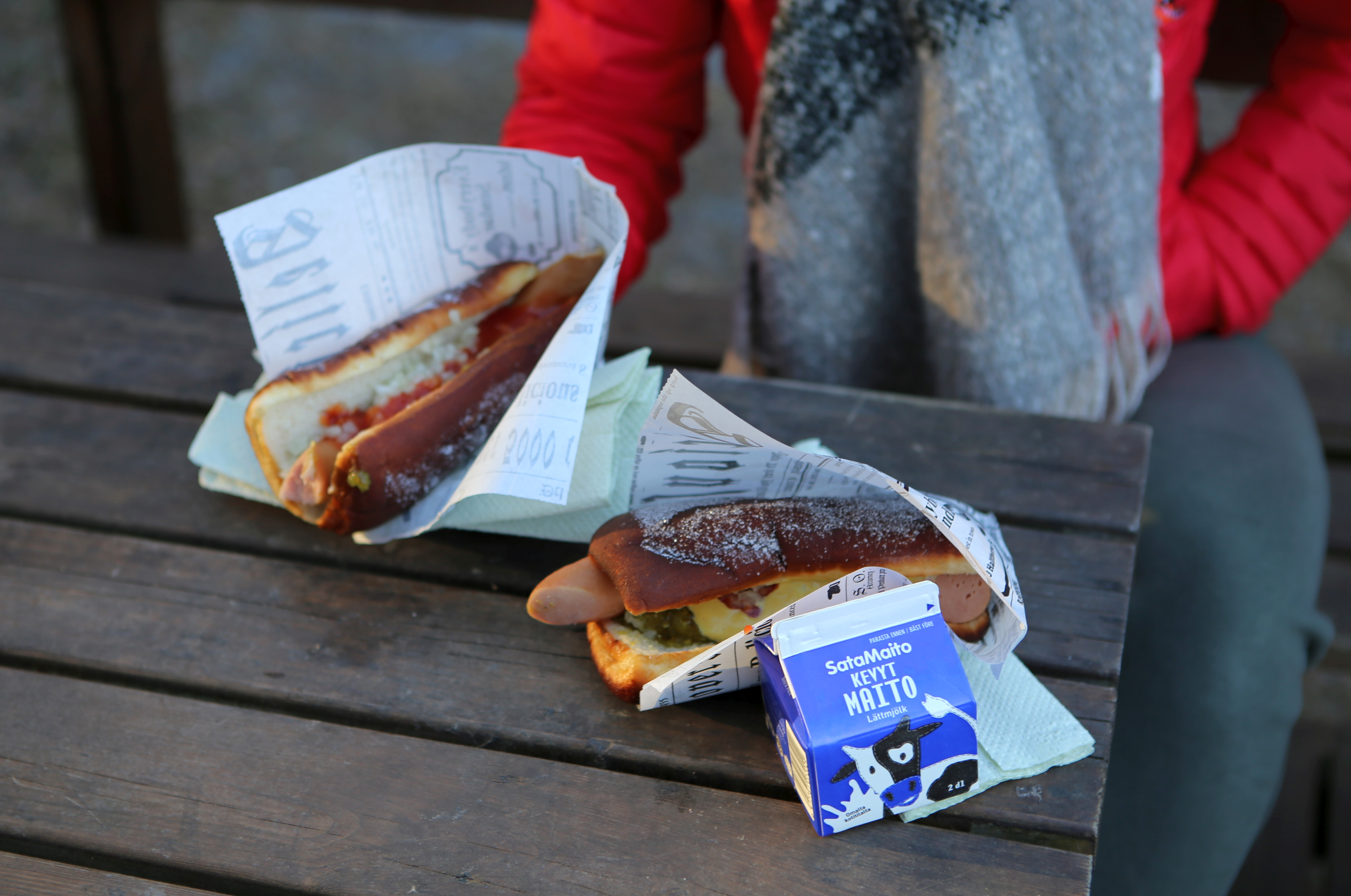
- The traditional way to serve Kuuma koiras
- Alternative names: Kuumakoira
- Type: Fast food
- Place of origin: Finland
- Region or state: Nokia
- Created by: Teodor Leppänen
- Main ingredients: Jelly doughnut, sausage, mustard, ketchup, pickle relish, chopped onions

Kuuma koira is a fast food dish created in the 1960s in the Finnish city of Nokia. The term Kuuma koira is Finnish for "Hot dog", but the ingredients differ so much that Kuuma koira is a completely different dish. The dish is not well known outside the Pirkanmaa region, but Nokia holds an annual International Kuuma koira day in March to celebrate the cuisine. Thousands of Kuuma koiras are eaten at the local grills on that date.

== Invention and rise to fame ==
The dish was conceived in the 1960s by Teodor Leppänen (1902–1978), a fast food grill owner from Nokia. The most well-known story about the invention says that he had been selling apple jelly doughnuts with coffee and steamed sausages. Combining the surplus ingredients to save some money, he created Kuuma koira. In the following decades, other grill owners in the area copied the dish, and it became a staple in the local fast food scene. In the late 2000s, the MTV3 entertainment show Ennätystehdas had Mikko Salonen from Nokia eating four and a half Kuuma koiras in five minutes on a live broadcast, setting a new official record. Around the same time, the International Kuuma koira day was held for the first time. These events together propelled the cuisine to the knowledge of all Finns, further aided by the Finnish Grillit huurussa fast food program on the Nelonen TV channel in 2016.

== See also ==
- Hot dog
