= Nokia water supply contamination =

2007 water contamination event in Nokia, Finland

Location of Nokia in Finland

The Nokia water supply contamination occurred from November 28 to 29, 2007, when a large part of the water supply in Nokia, Finland, was contaminated with treated sewage water. The contamination affected an area with some 12,000 inhabitants and caused an epidemic of thousands of cases of diarrhea and vomiting primarily due to Norovirus and Campylobacter infections. Hundreds of inhabitants were hospitalised, and the town was forced to temporarily forbid all use of tap water.

The cause of the contamination was revealed to be a combination of different events. A maintenance man in the Nokia waterworks had opened a valve between tap water and sewage water pipes to let some tap water flush out the sewage pipe. The valve had been previously installed against regulations. Because of pressure differences, the water flowed in the opposite direction, contaminating the tap water. At the same time, maintenance work was being carried out at another site, so the first calls from people complaining about the water were not taken seriously because they were thought to be connected with that event. It took two days until an official warning was given that the water was contaminated and until bottled water deliveries were started.

== Background ==
There was a poorly designed installation in the Kullaanvuori water treatment facility. A drinking water pipe was connected to a wastewater pipe for the purpose of flushing the wastewater pipe. Such an installation is illegal, and for good reason; if the water pressure in the drinking water pipe is too low, backflow occurs. This is what happened in this event. A maintenance worker accidentally opened the valve, and wastewater flowed into the drinking water supply for two days. The contamination was actually detected, but the company decided to ignore it, assuming it was a transient pulse caused by the repairs.

== Identified bacteria and viruses ==
As of December 15, 2007:

- Escherichia coli
- Salmonella
- Campylobacter
- Clostridioides difficile
- Norovirus
- Rotavirus
- Adenovirus
