= Nokia Revival =

Christian movement in Finland

Nokia Revival (also known as Nokia Missio) is a charismatic Christian movement originating in Finland in the town of Nokia. The starting point of the movement was in 1991, when Markku Koivisto, the vicar of Nokia Lutheran Church, experienced a strong charismatic renewal, having recovered from cancer of the lymph gland in 1990. Koivisto started to arrange so called Thursday Nights which were characterised by strong emotional worship, loud prayer and various manifestations of the Holy Spirit e.g. healings of the sick, spiritual gifts and falling down during prayer.

The nature and doctrines of the movement led to various disagreements with the Evangelical Lutheran Church of Finland (EL Church), and finally an alleged case of praying for a young boy's resurrection heated up the situation between Koivisto and the EL Church. An official complaint was filed in the spring of 2006 and on 25 April 2007, the Bishop of Tampere, Juha Pihkala, ordered Koivisto to leave the priesthood for half a year.

The Nokia Revival now has meetings in Tampere at Metro Auto Arena. The activity has also spread by 2005 to Helsinki and Kokkola, and furthermore to Jyväskylä. The Nokia revival was made a denomination in June 2008, bearing the name "Nokia Mission Church". Its meetings are mainly attended by members of Lutheran, Pentecostal and Free Evangelical churches.

Nokia revival's organisation is called Nokia Missio. It has mission work e.g. in Albania, India, Israel and Russia. Nokia Missio trains voluntary workers for churches. Other courses include the seeker-friendly Alpha Course, Nokia Missio Bible Institute's seminars and a cell group leading course.

Markku Koivisto earned a Doctor of Theology degree at University of Helsinki in 1997. In 2004, his cancer recurred but he recovered again in 2005. He was reported to have been dismissed from his position as the leader of the church after a sex scandal became public in 2011.

== Publications by Markku Koivisto ==
- Markku Koivisto: Miten kirkko ymmärtää sanomansa? Toimituskeskustelu ja kastetoimitus pastoraalipsykologisen ja liturgisen tutkimuksen näkökulmasta [How Does the Church Understand Its Gospel? Pre Sacrament Discussion and Baptism from the Viewpoint of Pastoral Psychology and Lithurgy Studies], University of Helsinki Publications, Käytännöllisen teologian julkaisuja 87, 1997, in Finnish, ISBN 951-45-7721-3
