= Nokian lukio =

High school in Finland

Coordinates: 61°28′57″N 23°31′4″E

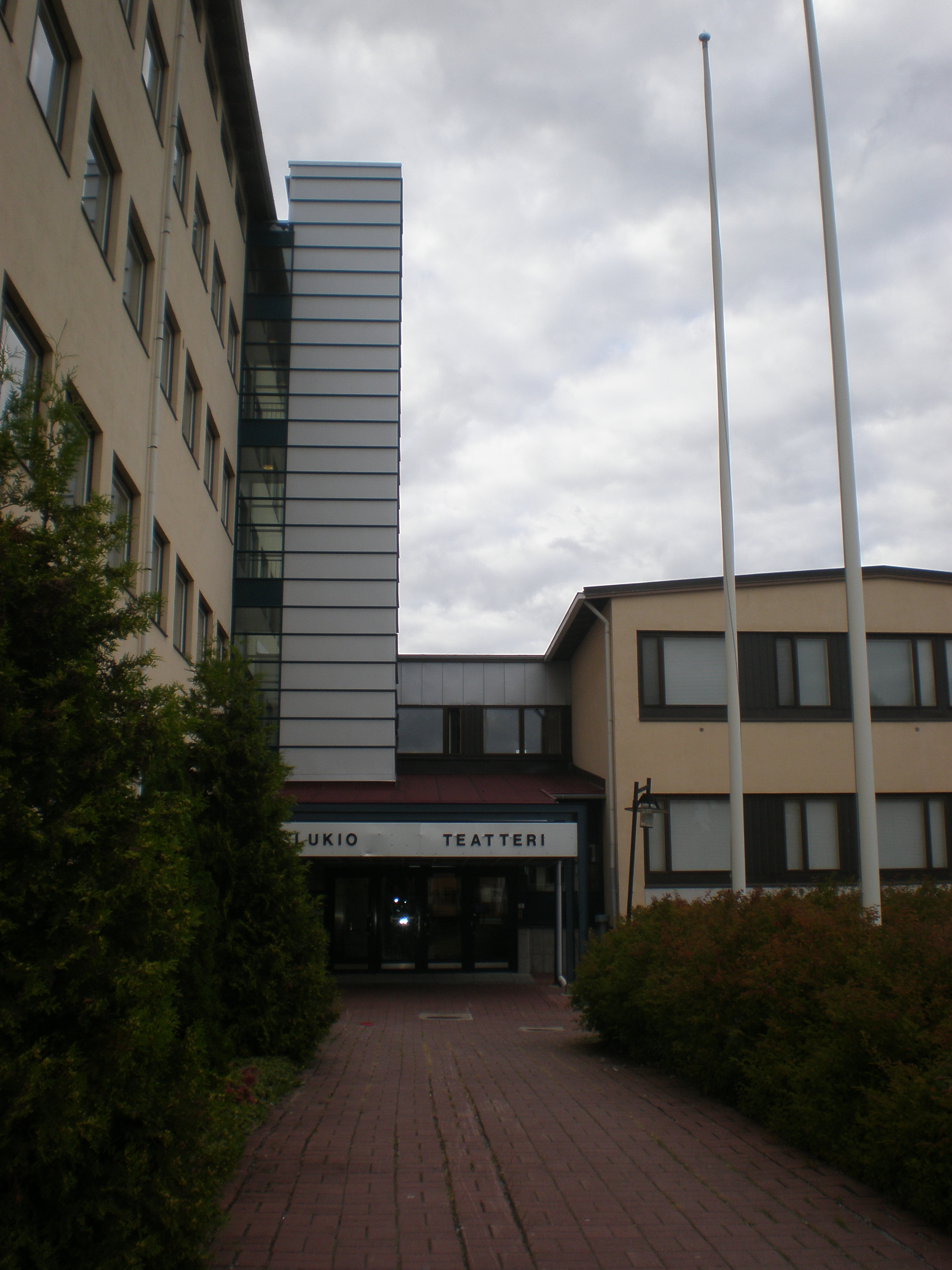
Nokia School

Nokian lukio (Nokia Senior High School) is a school located in the town of Nokia, Finland. There are about 415 students and 30 teachers. The principal of the school is Juha Sainio.

The school was founded in Ladoga Karelia in the year 1919 as the local school in the town of Jaakkima (Jaakkiman yhteiskoulu). The school's work in Jaakkima was interrupted by the Winter War and the school was evacuated March 3, 1940. The school of Jaakkima relocated to Nokia later in 1940. The school has been called Nokian lukio since 1976.

The school building was built in Nokia in 1940 and it was renovated in 1998. During the renovation the school got a modern auditorium which is used also by Nokia Workers' Theatre.
