= Nokia Theater =

Nokia Theater or Nokia Theatre may refer to:

- Nokia Theatre L.A. Live, now known as Peacock Theater in Los Angeles, California, United States
- Nokia Theater, now known as Palladium Times Square in Times Square, New York City, United States
- Nokia Theatre at Grand Prairie, now known as The Theatre at Grand Prairie in Grand Prairie, Texas, United States

== See also ==
- Nokia Arena, Tel Aviv now known as Menora Mivtachim Arena in Tel Aviv, Israel
- Nokia Arena (Tampere)
- Nokia (disambiguation)
