= Nokian Panimo =

Finnish brewery

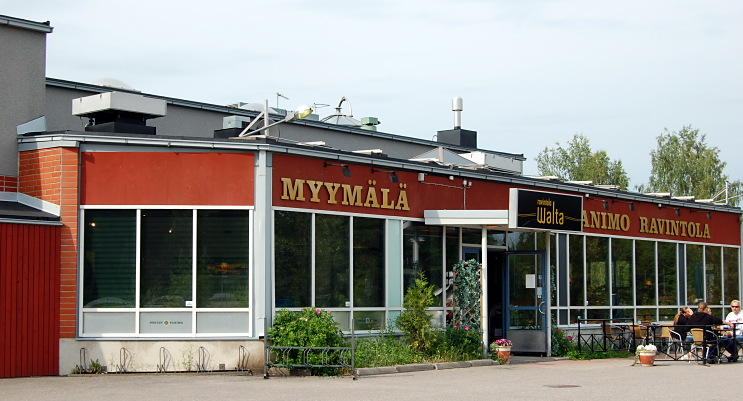
The factory shop and restaurant of Nokian Panimo.

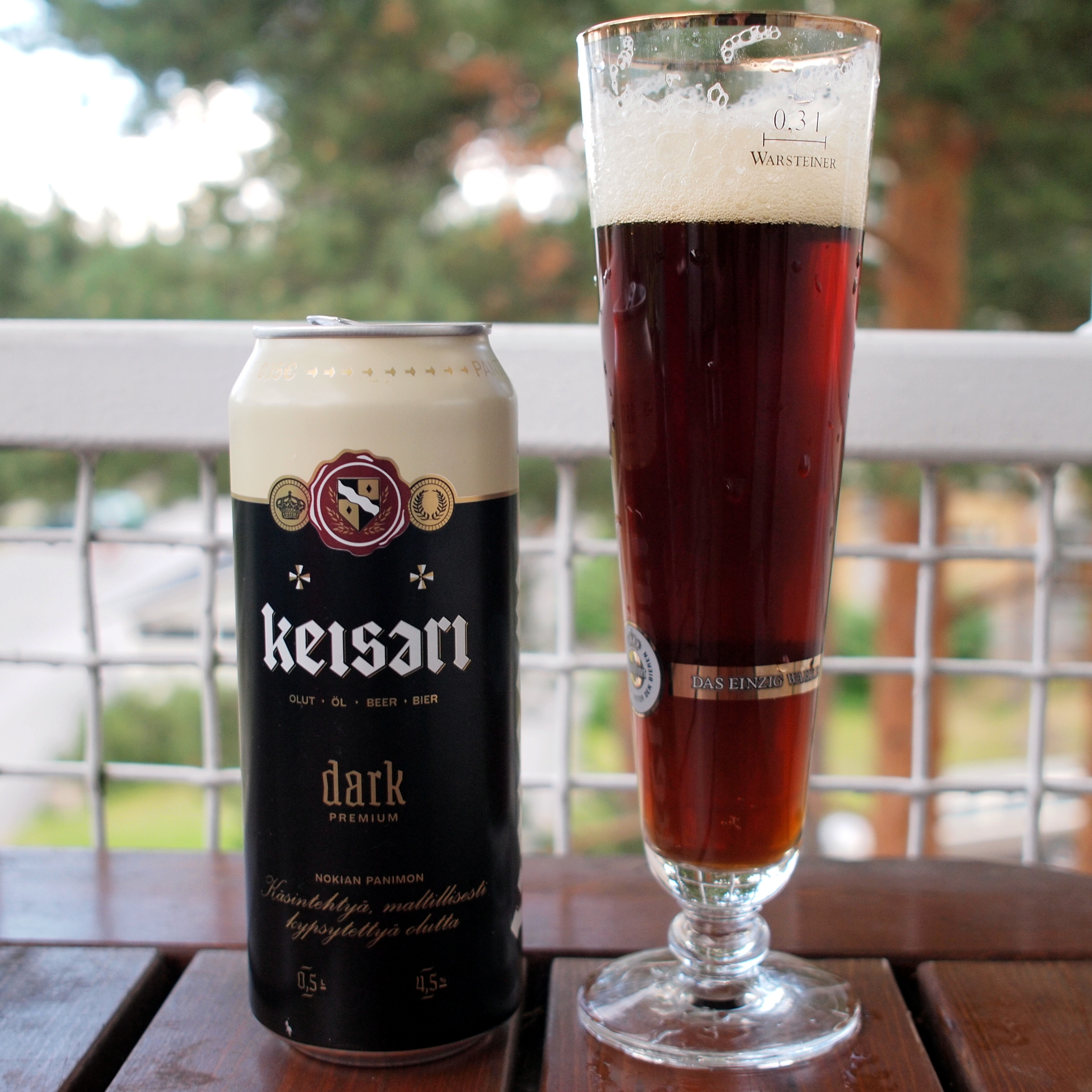
Nokian Keisari Dark

Nokian Panimo Oy (known as Pirkanmaan Uusi Panimo / PUP Oy until 2004) is a brewery in Nokia, Finland, founded in 1991. The brewery produces beer, cider, mineral water and soft drinks.

The best known brand of the brewery is the Keisari line of beers.

The brewery also produces small runs of named beers on request.

Nokian Panimo has grown to become Finland's second-largest craft brewery and the fifth-largest brewery overall by revenue in 2023. In 2024, the company's total sales volume exceeded 8.3 million litres with net sales of EUR 11.9 million.

In April 2025, Nokian Panimo was listed on the First North Helsinki stock exchange under the ticker symbol "BEER".
