= Nokia Church =

- Finnish: Nokian kirkko
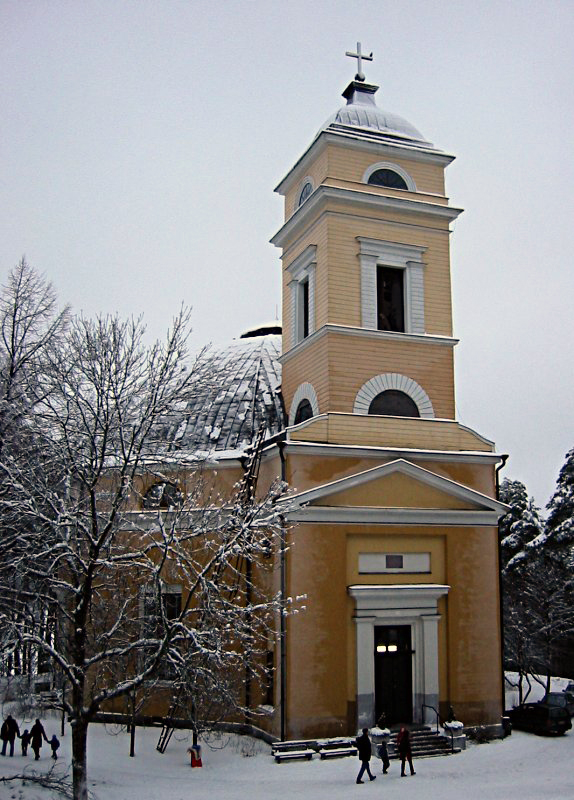
- Nokia Church
- 61°28′47″N 23°31′55″E
- Location: Nokia, Pirkanmaa
- Country: Finland
- Website: www.nokianseurakunta.fi

Architecture
- Architect: Carl Ludvig Engel
- Architectural type: Neoclassical
- Completed: 1837; 189 years ago

Specifications
- Capacity: 780

Administration
- Diocese: Tampere
- Parish: Nokia

The Nokia Church (Finnish: Nokian kirkko) is a 19th-century stone church located in Nokia town in Pirkanmaa, Finland. The Neoclassical church building was designed by C. L. Engel (1778–1840), and it was completed in 1837.

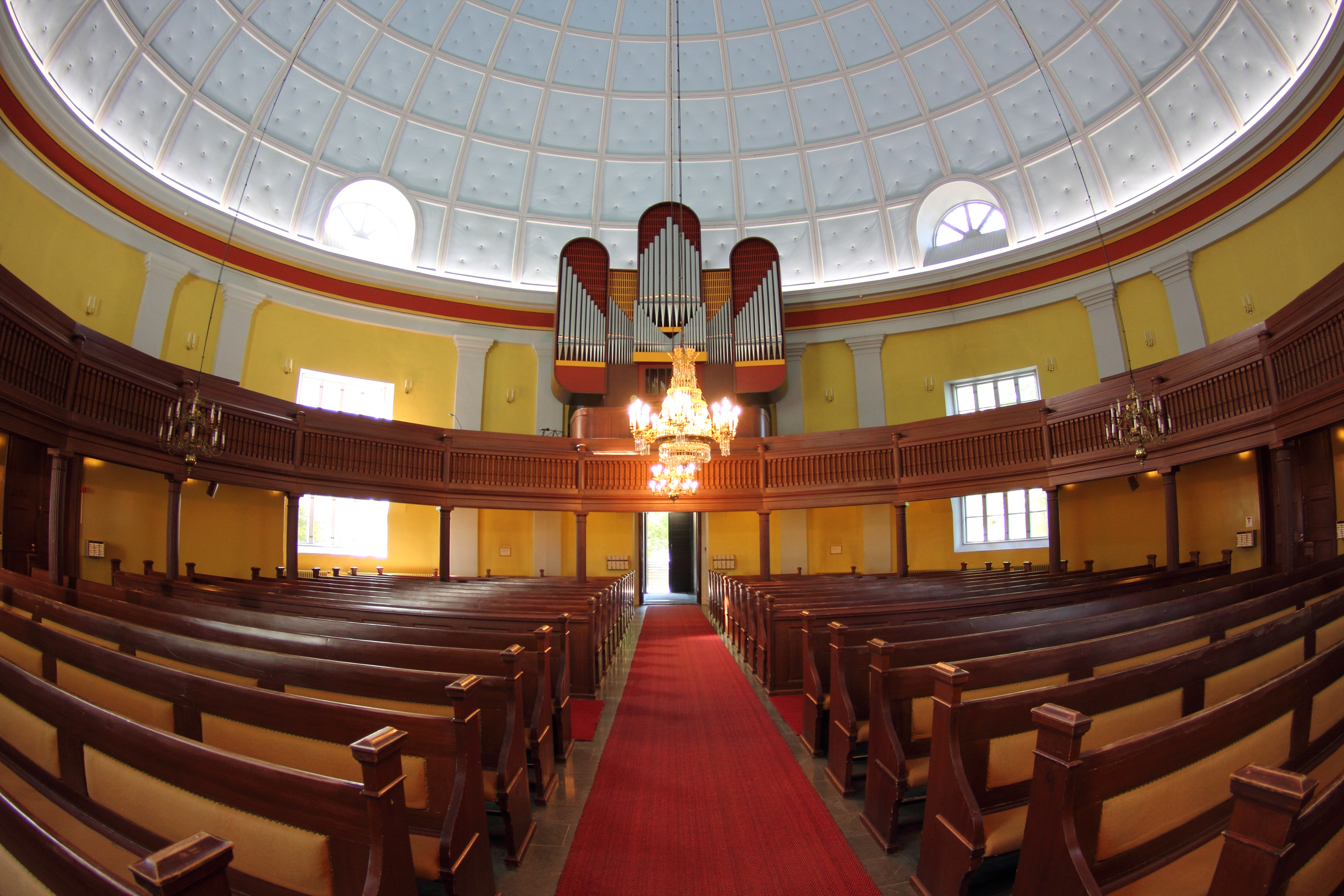
Interior of the Nokia Church

The model of the building is considered to be the Pantheon of Rome; the church hall is a full circle and the dome extends over the entire hall.

The church's 32-tone pipe organ was manufactured by the Kangasala's organ factory in 1974. The organ was built in connection with the repair of the church in 1973–1974. The church was also repaired later, in 1996, when, among other things, the limestone floor was renewed.

The altarpiece of the church is The Crucifixion of Christ from 1907 by Felix Frang.
