= Siuro =

Village in Pirkanmaa, Finland

Coordinates: 61°28.5068′N 23°20.1748′E

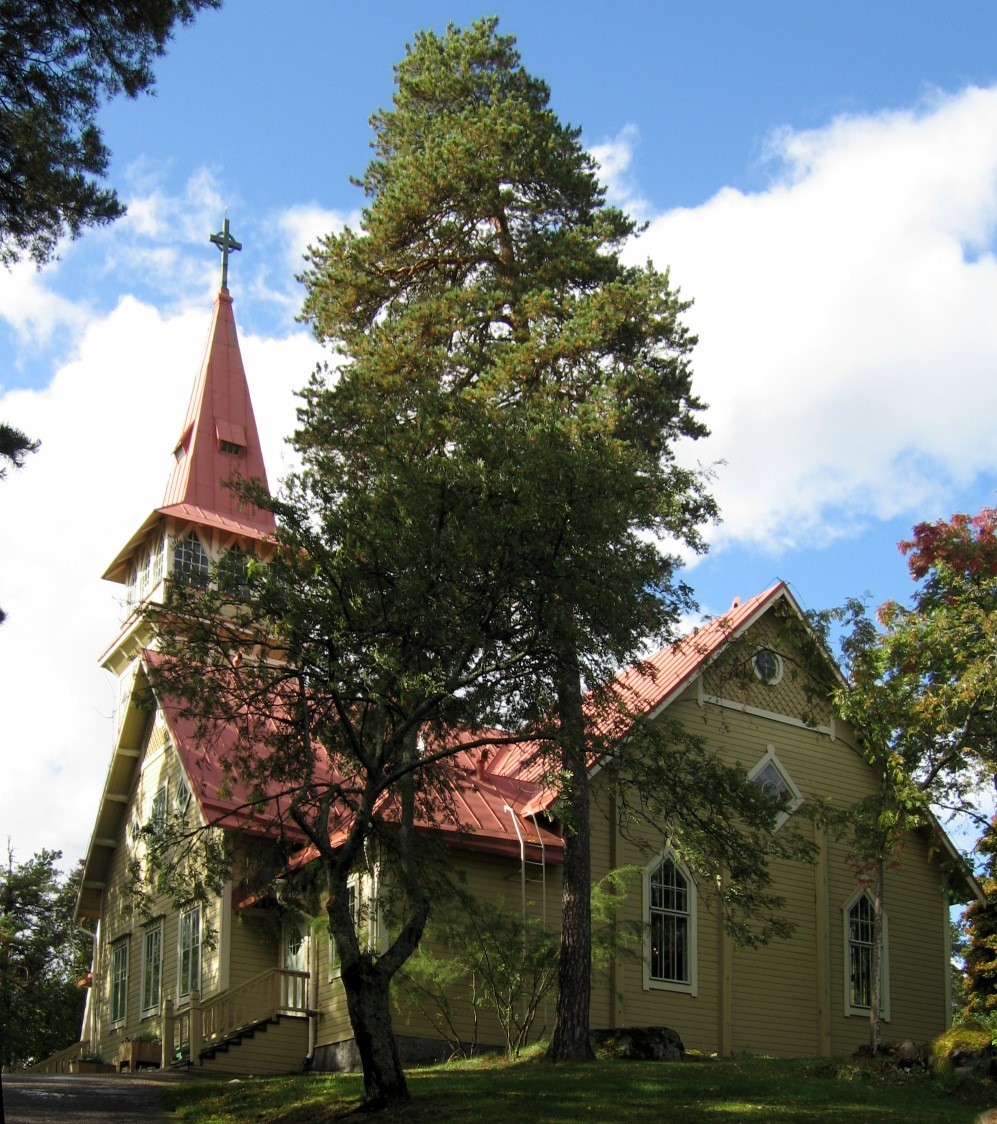
Siuro church

Siuro (Finnish pronunciation: [ˈsiu̯ro]) is a village in the western part of the Nokia town in Pirkanmaa, Finland. In 2015, the village has a population of 2,526. Siuro is a fairly large area, which includes the western part of the nearby Siuronkoski rapids. The historical border between Turku and Pori and Häme Provinces ran along Siuronkoski until the end of 1972. The village of Linnavuori is also often considered part of Siuro. The north area is bordered by Highway 11, and the south, by Lake Kulovesi. Siuro is less than ten kilometers from the center of Nokia and 25 kilometres (16 mi) from Tampere.

Although Siuro is quite village-like, its largest employers are the factories: the AGCO's power engine plant and Patria's engine maintenance unit in Linnavuori, as well as the Purso's aluminum plant. Siuro also has its own train station, where only freight trains stop today. Less than three kilometers from Siuro station in the direction of Pori, near Kulju Manor, there is the Kulovesi stop (abbreviation Kuv), which belonged to the original traffic places of the track. The stop was named after the lake, because there was already a traffic place called Kulju on the Riihimäki–Tampere railway line in Lempäälä. The shutdown mainly served only the needs of Kulju Manor and its surroundings. Passenger traffic was stopped in 1971 and the traffic site was closed in 1972. The buildings on the site have been demolished.
