= Nokia, Finland =

Nokia
- Town
- Nokian kaupunki (Finnish); Nokia stad (Swedish)
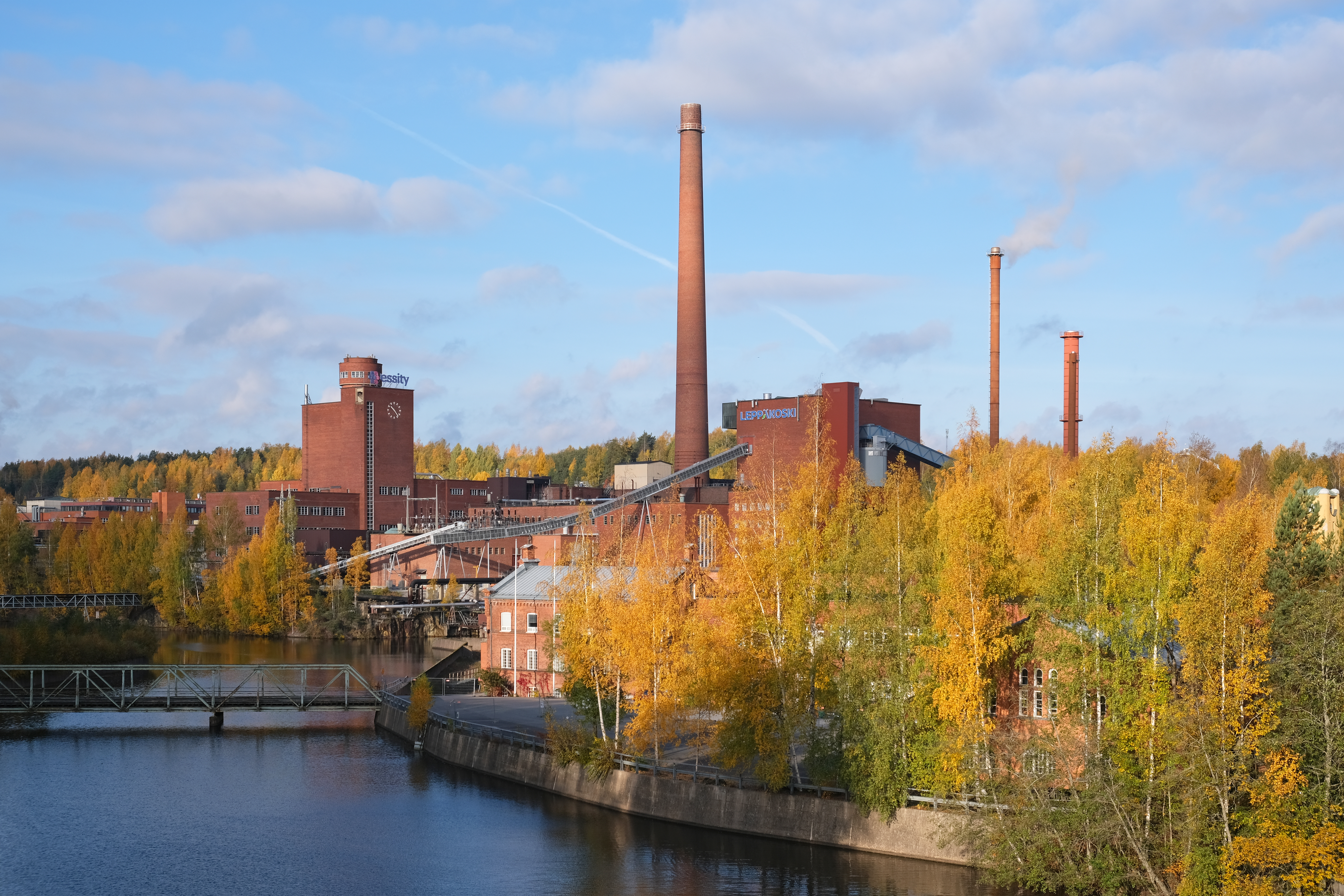
- Factories near the town centre, next to the Nokianvirta

- Coat of arms

- Location of Nokia in Finland
- Interactive map of Nokia
- Coordinates: 61°28′36″N 23°30′19″E
- Country: Finland
- Region: Pirkanmaa
- Sub-region: Tampere
- Metropolitan area: Tampere
- Charter: 1922
- Market town: 1937
- City rights: 1977

Government
  - Town manager: Markku Rahikkala

Area (2018-01-01)
  - Total: 347.76 km^{2} (134.27 sq mi)
  - Land: 288.3 km^{2} (111.3 sq mi)
  - Water: 59.58 km^{2} (23.00 sq mi)
  - Rank: 237th largest in Finland

Population (2025-12-31)
  - Total: 36,571
  - Rank: 33rd largest in Finland
  - Density: 126.85/km^{2} (328.5/sq mi)
  - Demonym: Nokialainen (Finnish)

Population by native language
  - Finnish: 95.5% (official)
  - Swedish: 0.3%
  - Others: 4.2%

Population by age
  - 0 to 14: 0%
  - 15 to 64: 20,953%
  - 65 or older: 0%
- Time zone: UTC+02:00 (EET)
  - Summer (DST): UTC+03:00 (EEST)
- Website: www.nokiankaupunki.fi

Nokia (Finnish pronunciation: [ˈnokiɑ]) is a town in the Pirkanmaa region of Finland. It lies on the banks of the Nokianvirta, a river of the Kokemäki River watershed, and is situated in the Tampere metropolitan area, about 15 kilometres (9 mi) west of Tampere proper. The population of Nokia is approximately 37,000, while the Tampere metropolitan area has a population of approximately 428,000. It is the 33rd most populous municipality in Finland, and the second largest in the Pirkanmaa region after Tampere.

Nokia's neighbouring municipalities are Hämeenkyrö, Pirkkala, Sastamala, Tampere, Vesilahti and Ylöjärvi. The distance to Tampere Airport from Nokia is 16 kilometres (9.9 mi) by road around Lake Pyhäjärvi.

== Etymology and heraldry ==
The origin of the name Nokia is obscure. In modern Finnish, noki means soot, and nokia is an inflected plural, although this form of the word is rarely, if ever, used. The most common theory claims the name actually originates from the archaic Finnish word nois (pl. nokia) or nokinäätä ("soot marten"), meaning sable. After the sable was hunted to extinction in Finland, the word was applied to any dark-coated fur animal, such as the marten, which are found in the area to this day. The sable is enshrined on the Nokia coat of arms. However, later research has appeared to indicate that sables never inhabited Finland in the first place, and the name nois may actually refer to the beaver. The coat of arms was designed by Gustaf von Numers and was confirmed on October 25, 1951.

== History ==
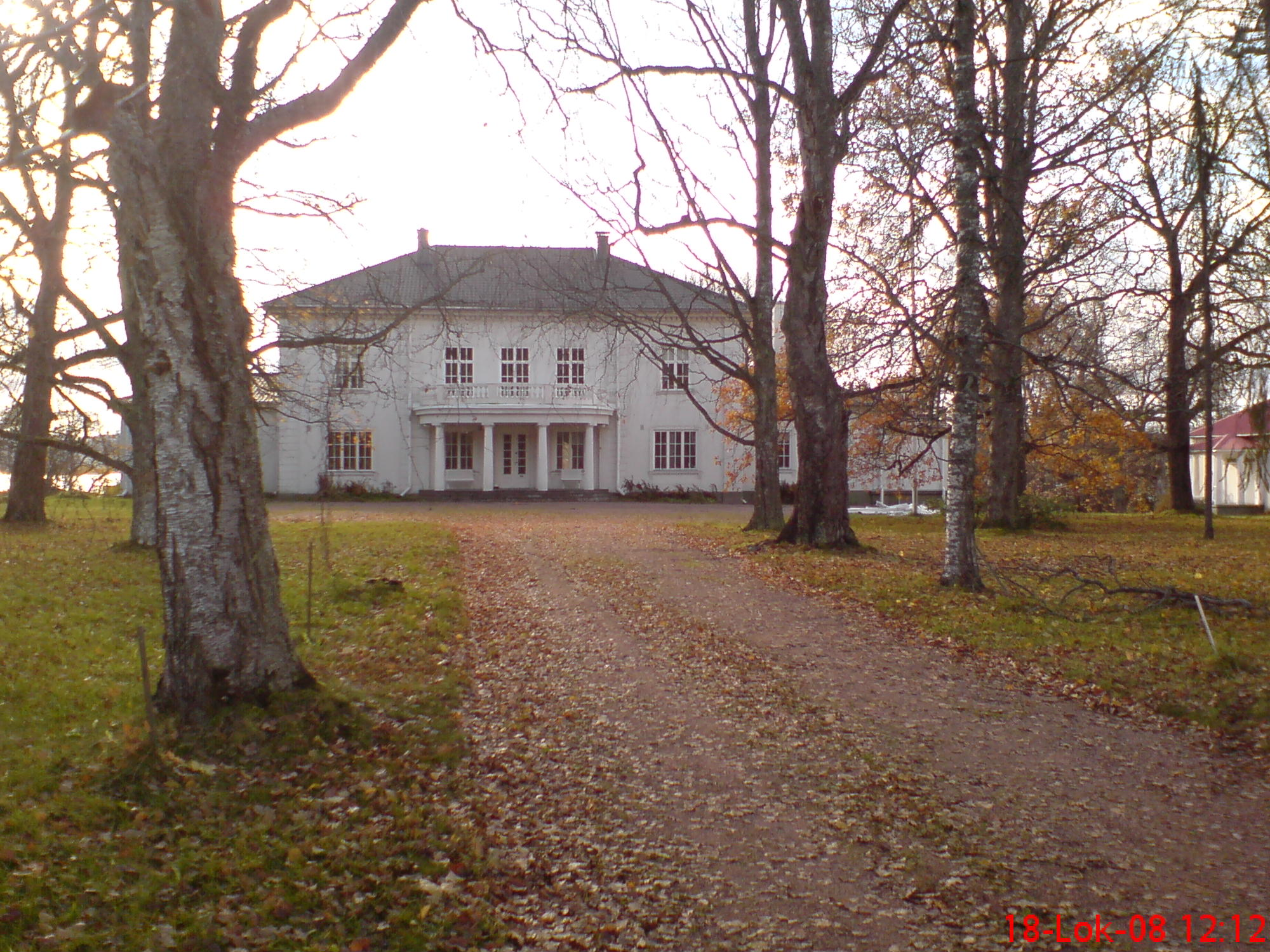
Kulju Manor in Siuro, Nokia, has been a seat farm since 1670.

The first literary reference to Nokia is in a 1505 document, which mentions two farms Stoora och Lilla Nokia, Swedish for "Big and Little Nokia". The Nokia manor was formed out of these two farms. The area was a part of the Pirkkala parish.

Nokia was the setting of one of the largest battles in the Club War, a 1596–1597 peasant uprising against feudal lords in Finland, which was then part of the Kingdom of Sweden. The peasants, armed with clubs, took up residence in Nokia Manor and won several skirmishes against the feudal cavalry, but were decisively defeated by Klaus Fleming on 1–2 January 1597. Thousands of clubmen were slain and their leader Jaakko Ilkka, who had fled, was captured a few weeks later and executed. The Club War was the last major peasant revolt in Finland, and it permanently consolidated the hold of the nation-state. Much later, in the Finnish Civil War (1918), Nokia (along with neighbouring Tampere) was a stronghold for the Red Guards and saw some combat.

In 1922, Suur-Pirkkala was split into Pohjois- and Etelä-Pirkkala (Northern and Southern). Nokia used to reach out to the current heart of Tampere, as the Pispala area was part of Nokia (Pohjois-Pirkkala) until 1937. In 1938 Pohjois-Pirkkala was renamed Nokia while Etelä-Pirkkala became simply Pirkkala. Two municipalities have been consolidated with Nokia: Suoniemi in 1973 and Tottijärvi in 1976. Nokia was designated as a city in 1977.

=== Industrial history ===
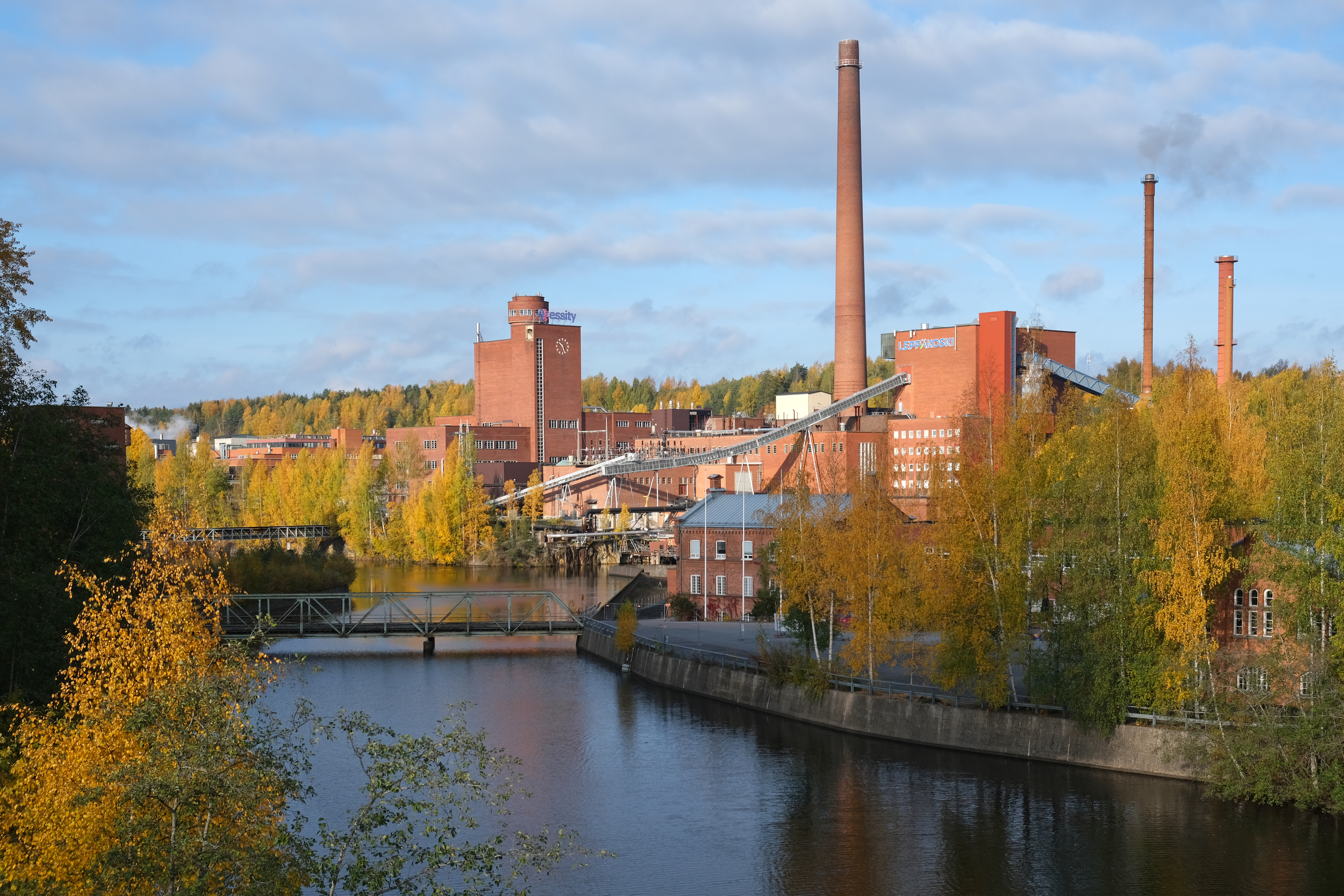
Old industrial buildings in Nokia

The early predecessor of eponymous telecommunications giant Nokia was (de facto) born when mining engineer Fredrik Idestam established his second groundwood pulp mill on the banks of Nokianvirta river near the town of Nokia in 1868 and his enterprises were named as Nokia Aktiebolag (Nokia Ltd) in 1871. Suomen Gummitehdas Oy (Finnish Rubber Works Ltd) set up a factory in Nokia in 1904. These two companies and Suomen Kaapelitehdas Oy (Finnish Cable Works Ltd) amalgamated in 1967 forming Nokia Corporation. Different branches of this conglomerate were split into several companies or sold off between 1988 and 1996. The rubber works still operate in Nokia as Nokian Tyres and originally in 1880 established paper mill as Essity.

Despite the Nokia Corporation having its early roots in Nokia it no longer has any operations in the city. Telecommunications business get started in the early 1960s as an electronics division of Finnish Cable Works Ltd (later Nokia Cable Ltd) in Helsinki and later also main office were moved to Capital Region. At this time the headquarters are situated in Espoo. The only current presence of the company in the city is the Nokia mansion, which is sometimes used for private parties for the company's executive staff. The city has repeatedly been asked to commemorate the company it gave birth to, but it has always declined, on the grounds that mobile phones were never produced there.

Nokia does have SoC R&D unit 15 kilometres (9 mi) away in nearby city of Tampere.

== Present ==
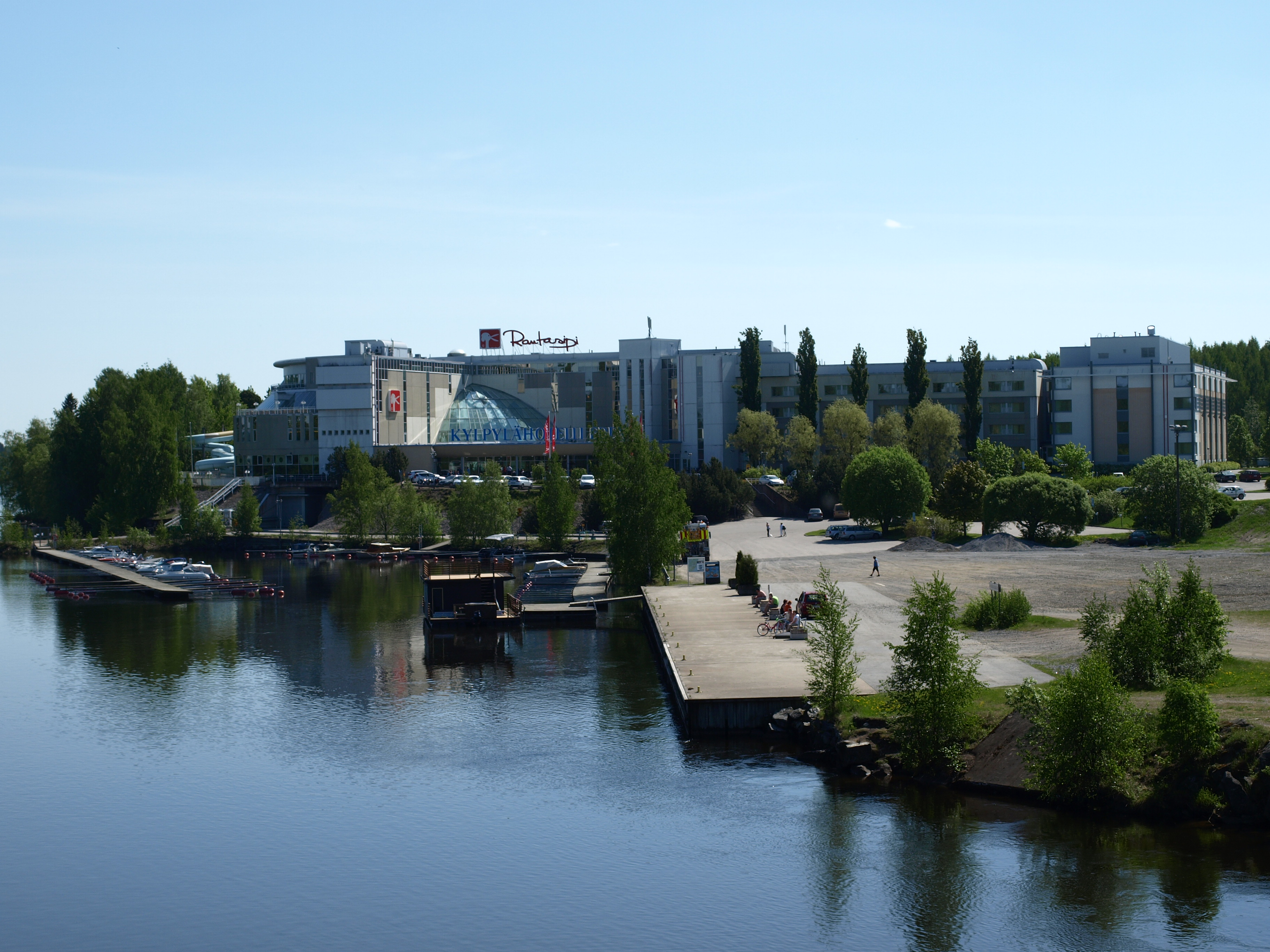
Spa hotel Rantasipi Eden in Nokia

Today's Nokia is famous for its spa, factory shops, waterways, and events. Nokia also enjoys good road and air connections. The largest companies are AGCO Power, Nokian Tyres, Purso, Patria Aviation and Essity paper mill. From a religious perspective, Nokia is best known for the charismatic Nokia Revival which began in 1990. Nokia is also known for its own fast food cuisine, Kuuma koira (Note: Finnish variation on a hot dog) and as a home town of Nokian Brewery. Due to the closeness of Tampere studio facilities, Nokia has been also used as a filming location. For example, Eric Sykes' The Big Freeze and Finnish TV production Korpelan Kujanjuoksu

== Demographics ==
=== Population ===
Population size 1980–2025
Year	Population
1980	23,644
1985	24,325
1990	26,063
1995	26,287
2000	26,905
2005	29,147
2010	31,647
2015	33,162
2020	34,476
2025	36,571

=== Notable natives and residents ===
- Markku Aro – singer
- Marko Asell – Olympic wrestler
- Shawn Hopkins – basketball player
- Roope Hintz – ice hockey player
- Kikka – pop singer
- Otto Koivula – ice hockey player
- Toivo Kärki – composer, musician, producer and arranger was born in Pirkkala, in an area which is now Nokia
- Jari Niemi – football player
- Kari Peitsamo – musician
- Tapio Rautavaara – athlete, musician, and actor was born in Pirkkala, in an area which is now Nokia
- Elsa Rautee – poet
- Anssi Salmela – ice hockey player
- Sami Sandell – ice hockey player
- Sanni Vanhanen – ice hockey player
- Juuso Välimäki – ice hockey player
- Sami Välimäki – professional golfer

== Statistics ==
Employed according to socio-economic station in Nokia:
SES	Employers
Entrepreneurs altogether	954
Higher officials	1322
Lower officials	3137
Farm workers	49
Industrial workers	2731
Other production workers	802

== Distances to the other cities and towns ==
- Tampere – 15 kilometres (9.3 mi)
- Sastamala – 35 kilometres (22 mi)
- Hämeenlinna – 80 kilometres (50 mi)
- Pori – 95 kilometres (59 mi)
- Rauma – 125 kilometres (78 mi)
- Turku – 150 kilometres (93 mi)
- Helsinki – 180 kilometres (110 mi)
- Vaasa – 240 kilometres (150 mi)

== Twin towns – sister cities ==
Nokia is twinned with:

- Karlstad, Sweden
- Moss, Norway
- Horsens, Denmark
- Blönduós, Iceland

== Gallery ==
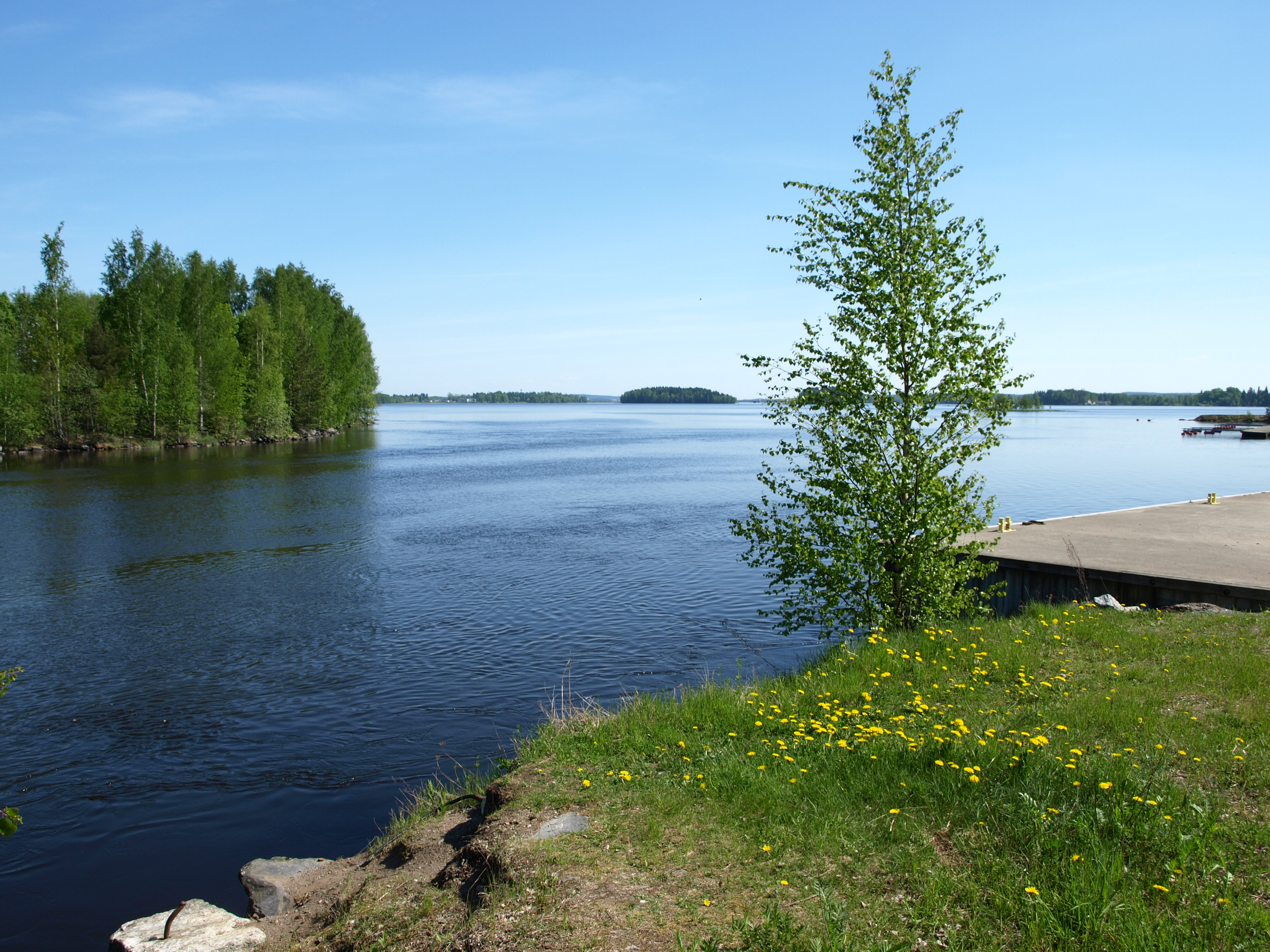
Lake Pyhäjärvi seen from Nokia

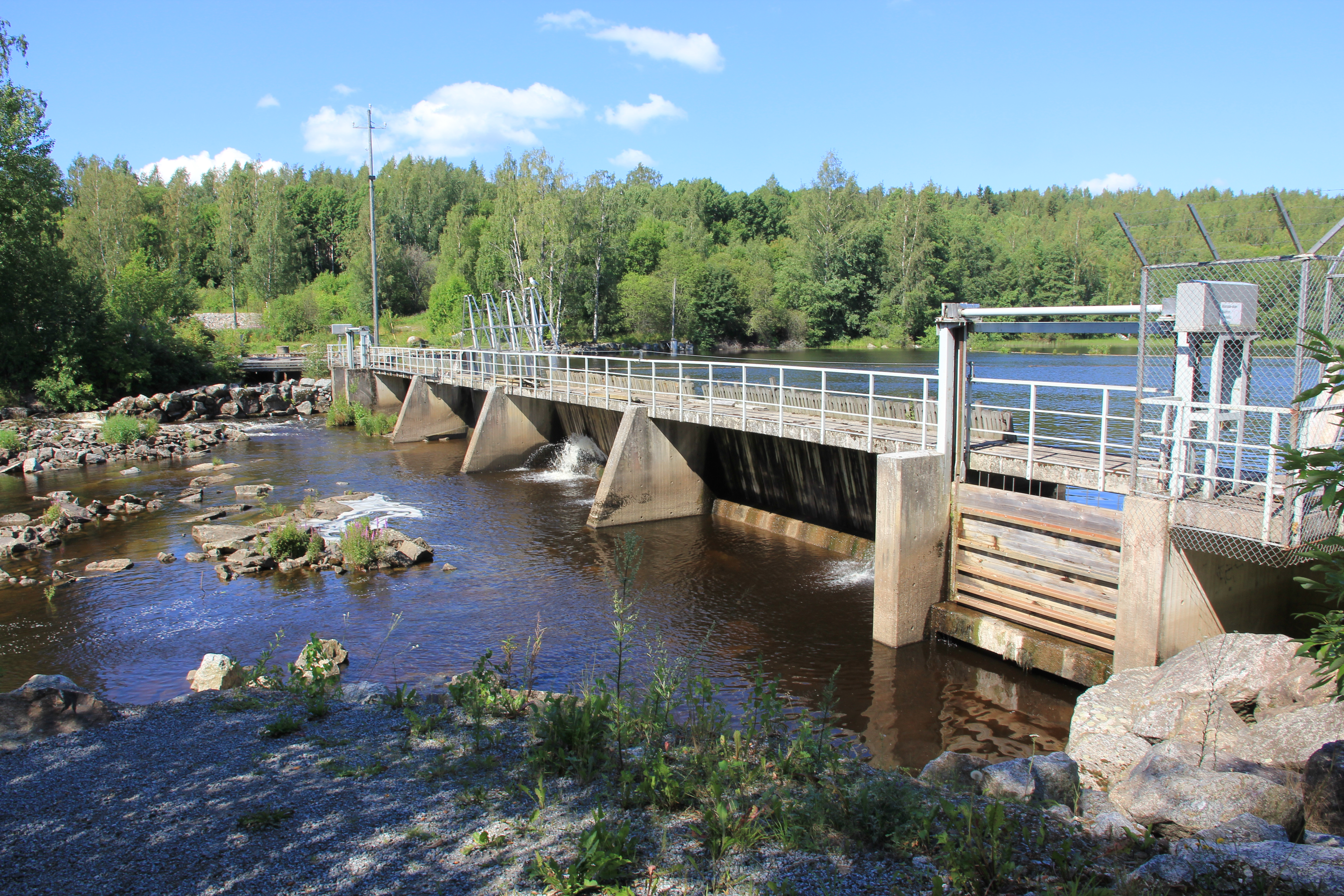
Siuronkoski dam

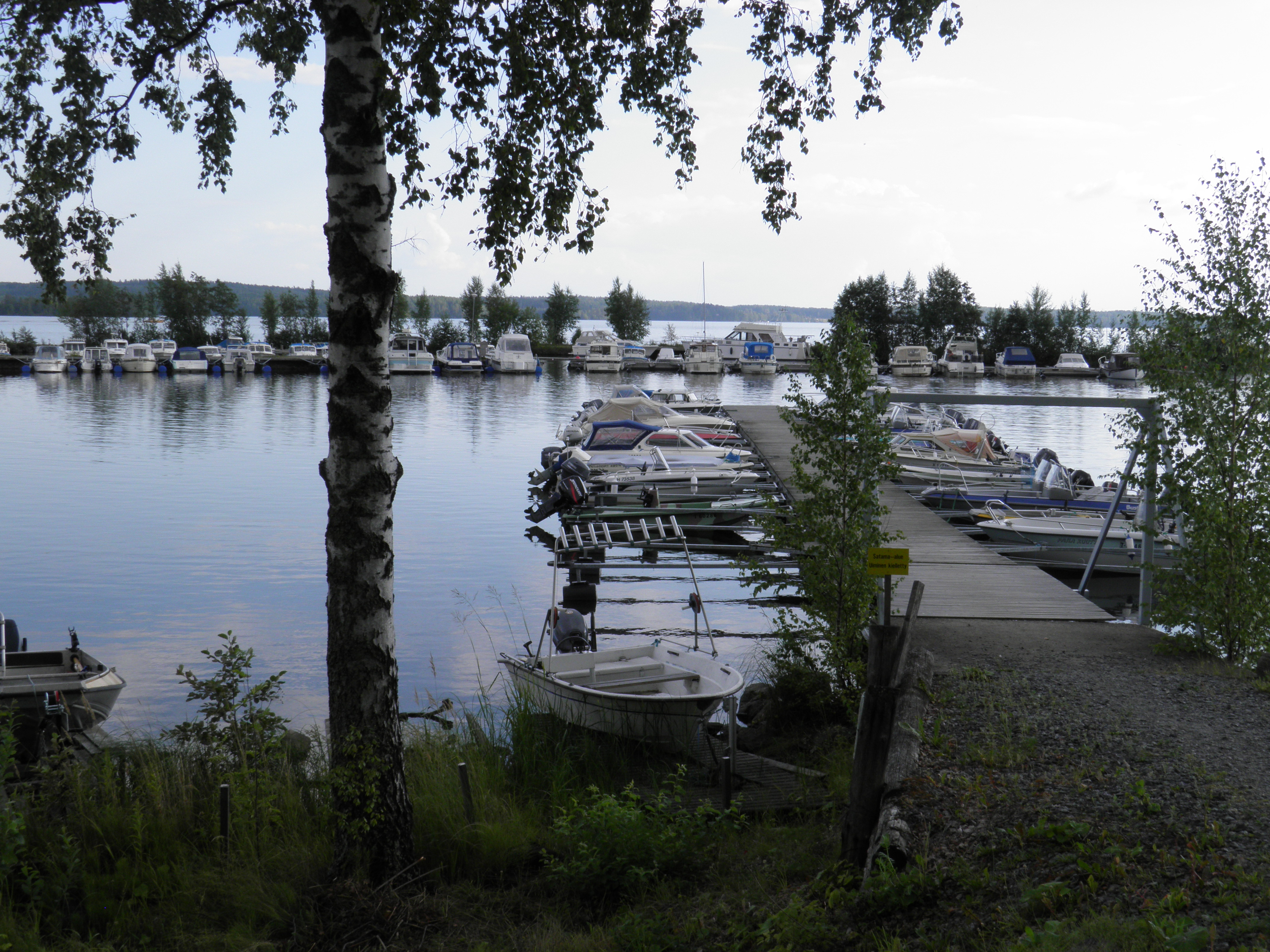
Vihola marina

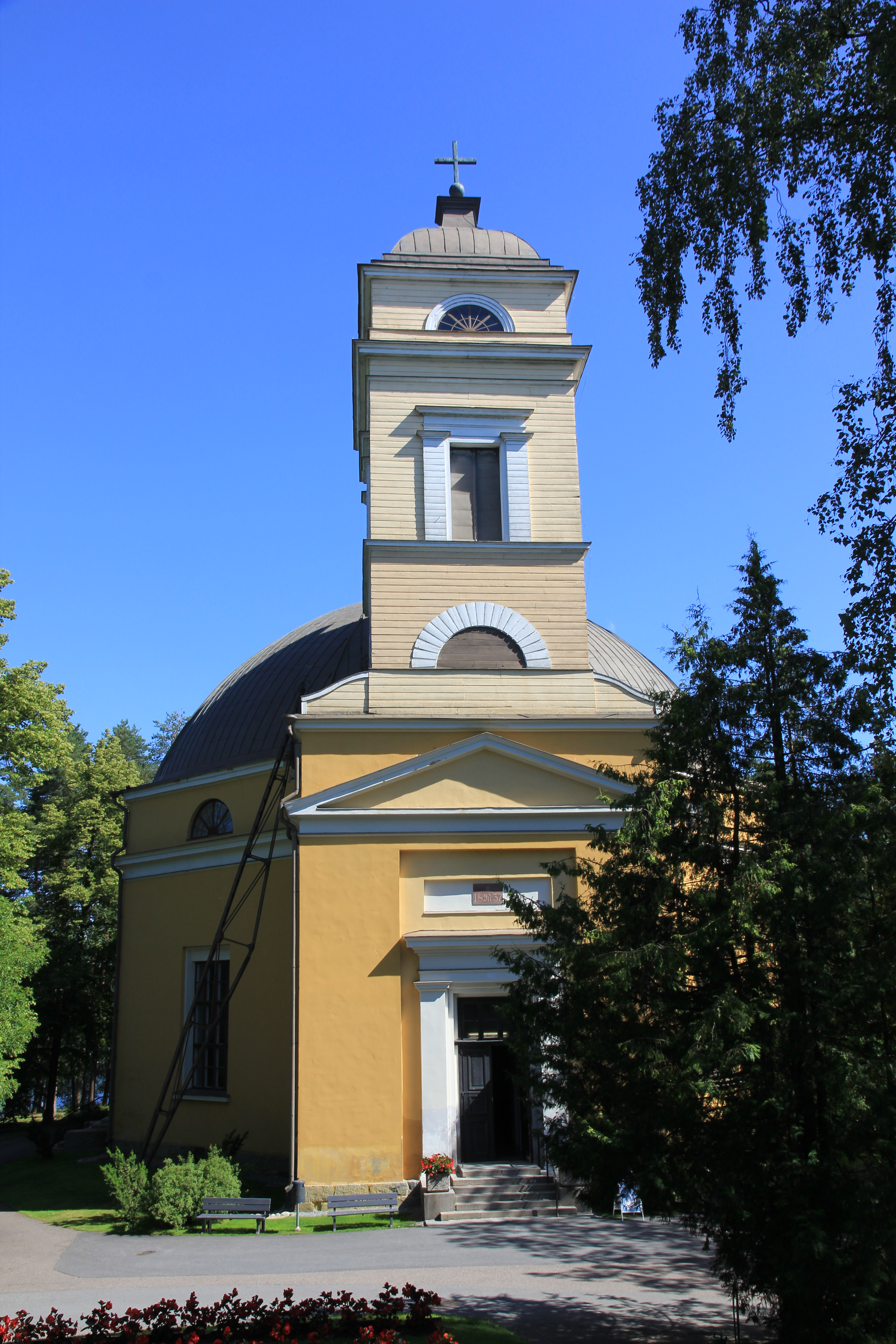
Nokia church

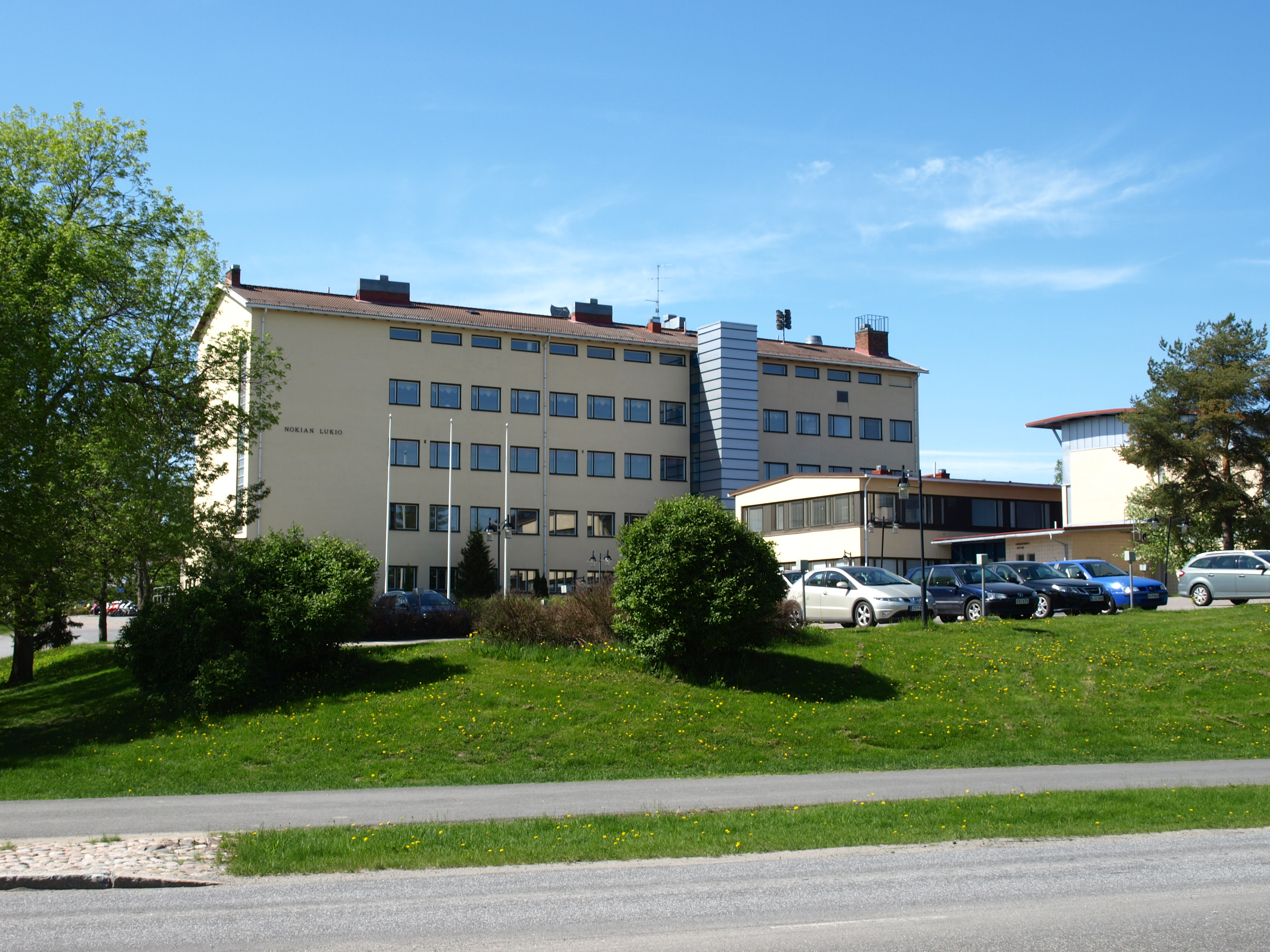
Nokian lukio (high school)

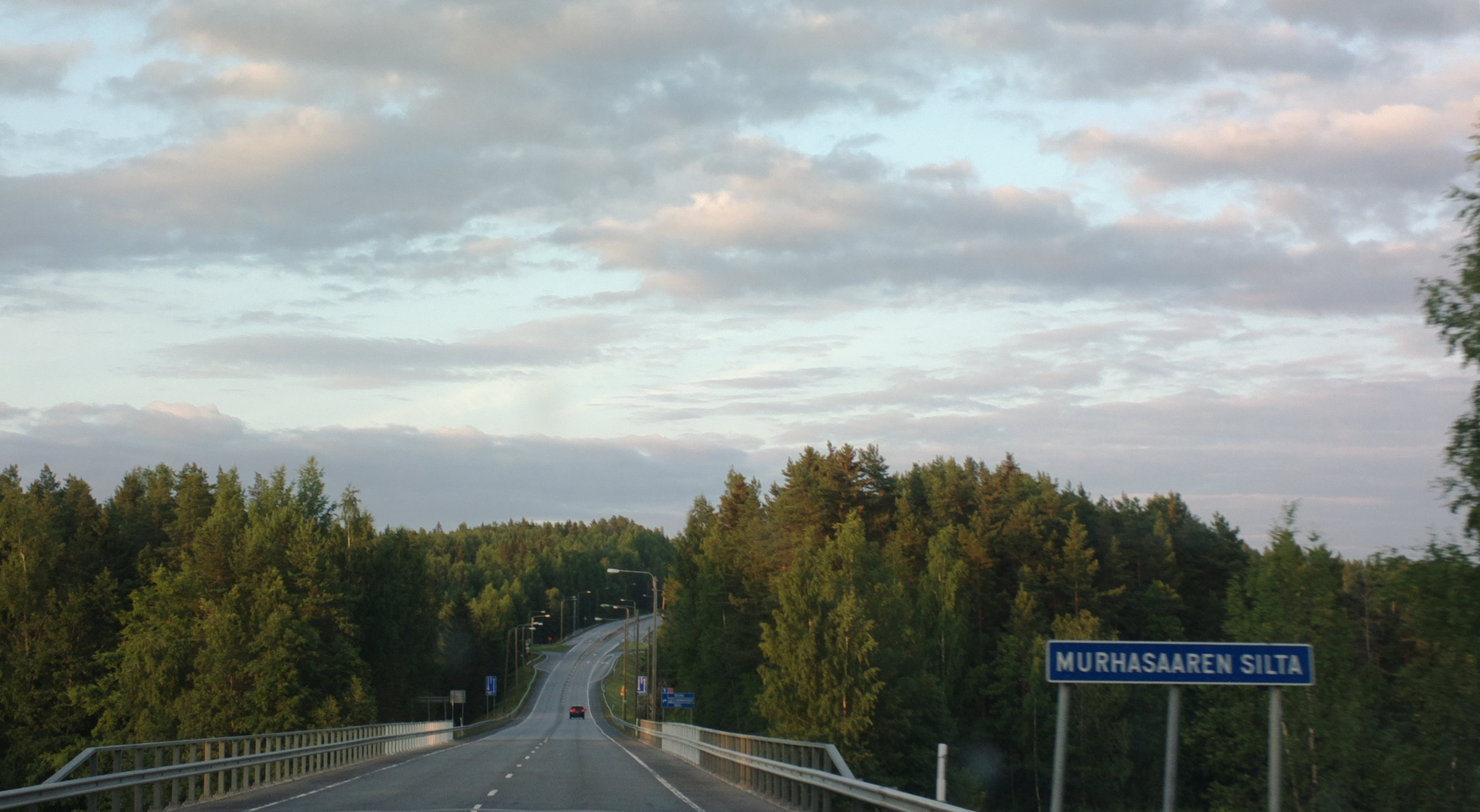
Finnish national road 11

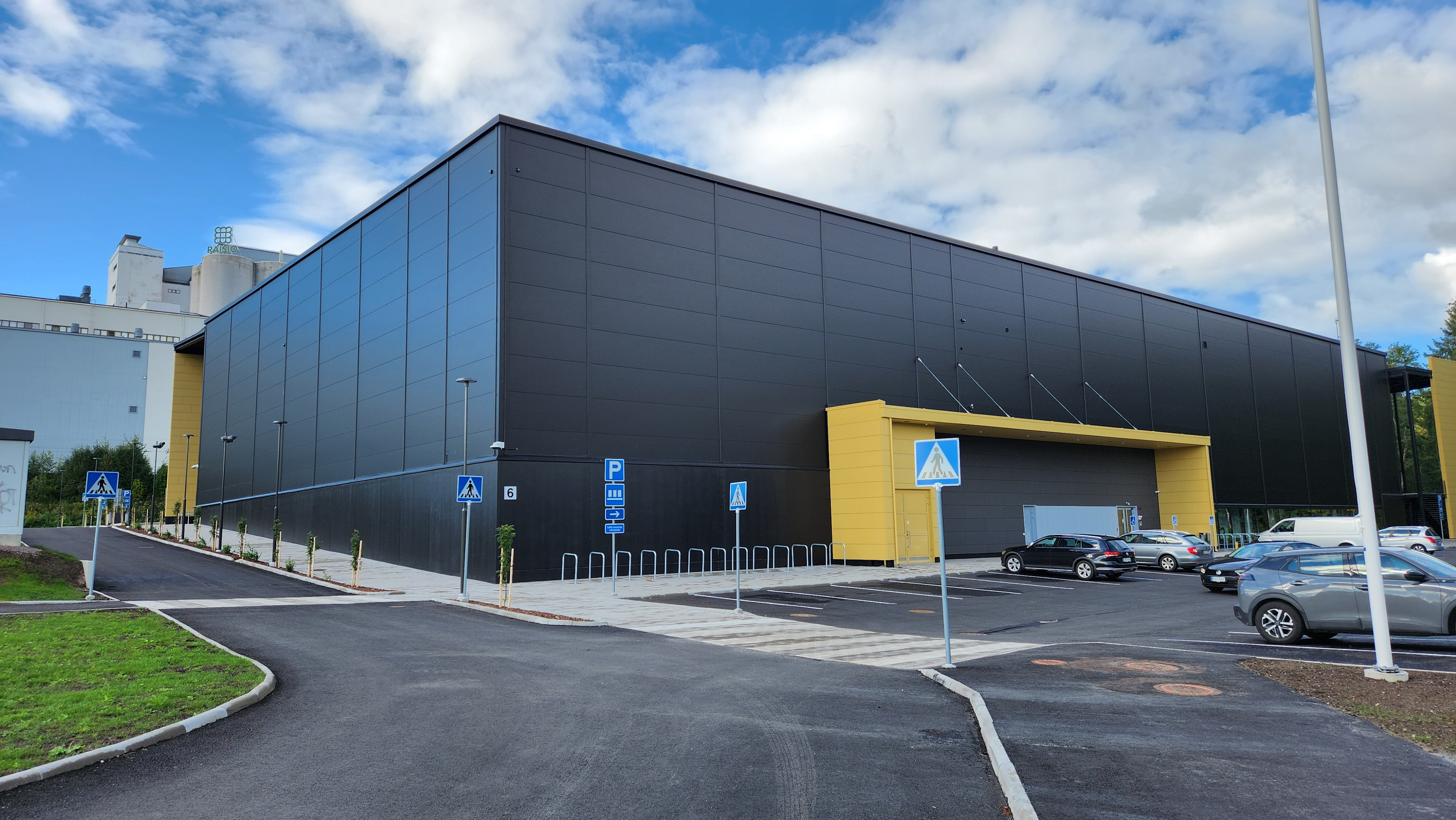
AGCO Power Arena

== See also ==
- Finnish national road 11
- Ikaalinen, another spa town in the Pirkanmaa region
- Nokia railway station
- Nokia water crisis
- Siuro, a village in Nokia
- Suoniemi, a former municipality, today part of Nokia
- Tottijärvi, a former municipality, today part of Nokia
