= Nokian Tyres =

Finnish tyre company

Nokian Tyres plc
- Formerly: Nokia Tyres (until 1995)
- Type: Public
- Traded as: Nasdaq Helsinki: TYRES
- Industry: Manufacturing and service
- Founded: 1898; 128 years ago (Finnish Rubber Works) 1988; 38 years ago (Nokia Tyres Limited)
- Headquarters: Nokia, Finland
- Key people: Jouko Pölönen (chairman); Paolo Pompei (CEO)
- Products: Tyres
- Revenue: €1.374 billion (2025)
- Operating income: €35.8 million (2025)
- Net income: −€15.0 million (2025)
- Total assets: €2.314 billion (end 2025)
- Total equity: €1.164 billion (end 2025)
- Number of employees: 3,959 (end 2025)
- Website: www.nokiantyres.com

Nokian Tyres plc (Finnish: Nokian Renkaat Oyj) is a Finnish tyre manufacturer headquartered in Nokia, Finland, which produces tyres for cars, trucks, buses, and heavy-duty equipment. Known for its winter tyres, Nokian is the only tyre manufacturer in the world with its own permanent winter tyre testing facility. The company's Hakkapeliitta brand name is recognised in Finland as a trademark.

Nokian Tyres concentrates on the consumer car and vehicle tyre replacement and premium snow tyre markets. The company also produces retreading materials and tyre pressure monitors. It once manufactured bicycle tyres but later licenced the Nokian name on bicycle tyres to another Finnish company. The Vianor retail tyre store chain, which services cars in addition to selling tyres, is owned by Nokian Tyres PLC.

The company traces its history to a groundwood pulp mill established in 1865. Car tyre production began in 1932 by Suomen Gummitehdas Oy (Finnish Rubber Works Ltd). A three-company merger formed the Nokia Corporation in 1967; the current Nokian Tyres plc was established in 1988 as Nokia Tyres Limited, a joint venture company with Sumitomo Rubber Industries split from the conglomerate as Nokia Corporation started focusing entirely on the mobile communications business, and was renamed Nokian seven years later with its IPO. Nokian is "Nokia" in the genitive, thus Nokian renkaat meaning "Tyres of Nokia". The European subsidiary of Japanese tyre company Bridgestone is currently the largest minority shareholder. As of 12 December 2019, Bridgestone direct holding was reduced to 3%. (Rubber News 6 January 2020)

== History ==
The brand logo of Nokia Corporation between 1967 and 1970

Nokia municipality, Finland

Early corporate predecessors of Nokian Tyres are the Nokia Aktiebolag (Nokia Company) and Suomen Kumitehdas Oy (Finnish Rubber Works Ltd.). In 1865, mining engineer Fredrik Idestam established a groundwood pulp mill on the banks of the Tammerkoski rapids in the town of Tampere, in southwestern Finland. In 1868, Idestam built a second mill near the town of Nokia, 15 kilometres (9.3 mi) west of Tampere by the Nokianvirta River, which had better resources for hydroelectric production. In 1871, with the help of his close friend, the statesman Leo Mechelin, Idestam renamed and transformed his mills into a share company, founding the Nokia Company.

Suomen Gummitehdas Oy was founded in 1898 and began manufacturing bicycle tyres in 1925 and car tyres in 1932. The Hakkapeliitta tyre name was introduced in 1936, and some tyres sold under the Nokian tyre name still use the Hakkapeliitta brand name. Hakkapeliitta is a (Finnish) historical term used for a Finnish light cavalryman in the service of King Gustavus Adolphus of Sweden during the Thirty Years' War (1618–48). In 1967, Suomen Kumitehdas Oy (originally called Suomen Gummitehdas Oy, Finnish Rubber Works in English) merged with Kaapelitehdas (The Cable Company) and the forest and power industry company Nokia Aktiebolag to create Nokia Corporation.

Nokia Corporation's tyre division (which had manufactured tyres under the Nokia brand; Nokian is the genitive) was split from the Nokia Corporation when Nokia Tyres Limited was created in 1988 as a joint venture company with SP Tyres UK Limited/Dunlop, the British subsidiary of Japanese tyre company Sumitomo Rubber Industries. Nokian Tyres PLC shares were floated on the Helsinki Stock Exchange (OMX Helsinki) in 1995, and was renamed Nokian as a result. Nokia, which became the largest mobile telephone manufacturer in 1998, ended its ownership interest in Nokian Tyres in 2003, selling its holding of 2 million shares to Bridgestone Europe NV/SA, a subsidiary of the Japanese tyre manufacturer Bridgestone, for U.S. $73.2 million. This made Bridgestone the largest shareholder, with an 18.9% stake, later diluted to 16.8%. Bridgestone announced that Nokian Tyres would be operated independently, but it would consider complementing the company's product development, testing, and distribution.

In 1974 the production of bicycle tyres and inner tubes was centered in a new factory in Lieksa, Finland. In 2004, Nokian Tyres sold its bicycle tyre business to Suomen Rengastehdas Oy for €3.6 million. This successor company remained one of the few manufacturers of tungsten carbide-studded snow tyres for bicycles. Suomen Rengastehdas continued to produce bicycle tyres until the bankruptcy of the company on 20 May 2019. In September 2019 LieksaTyres Oy acquired the bankruptcy estates including model rights, immaterial rights and production lines of Suomen Rengastehdas and continued the production of promising product categories including bicycle summer tyres.

Nokian Tyres set up a joint venture, Ordabasy – Nokian Tyres JSC, with Ordabasy Corporation JSC, a multi-industry Kazakh company, to manufacture passenger car tyres at a planned new factory in Kazakhstan. The venture started in 2007, but the manufacturing project was put on hold in early 2009. Nokian Tyres was to provide technical expertise in tyre manufacturing, and the products were to be sold in Kazakhstan, Central Asia, Russia, and Eastern Europe. In 2009, the Nokian Hakkapeliitta tyre model line received the "List of trademarks with a reputation" status by the National Board of Patents and Registration of Finland.

The 2022 Russian invasion of Ukraine had a severe impact on Nokian Tyres as the company had manufactured 80 percent of its car tyres in Russia. Nokian initially continued its operations in Russia, expressing that it wished to retain control over its factories and ensure they were not used for military purposes. It also said it would boost production in Finland and the United States. During the summer, Nokian began to withdraw from Russia. In October, Nokian sold its Russian operations to Tatneft for €400 million and announced a €650 million investment for a new factory in Romania.

== Financial information ==
Nokian Tyres' three principal activities are the manufacture of passenger car tyres, heavy commercial tyres, and retail tyre sales. As of 2008, Nokian is the most profitable tyre manufacturer in the world, at up to 18% earnings (before taxes and interest) relative to sales, compared to 14% at Bridgestone, 8% at Michelin, and 9.6% at Continental.

In 2010, Nokian Tyres profits were €167.9 million on sales of €1.058 billion, an increase in revenues of 32.5% on the previous year. The company had revenue growth of 18% annually in the 2003–2007 period. Nokian Tyres is also publicly traded on the Berlin Stock Exchange. Kim Gran has been the President and chief executive officer since 1 September 2000, having previously served as a vice president for five years.

== Products ==
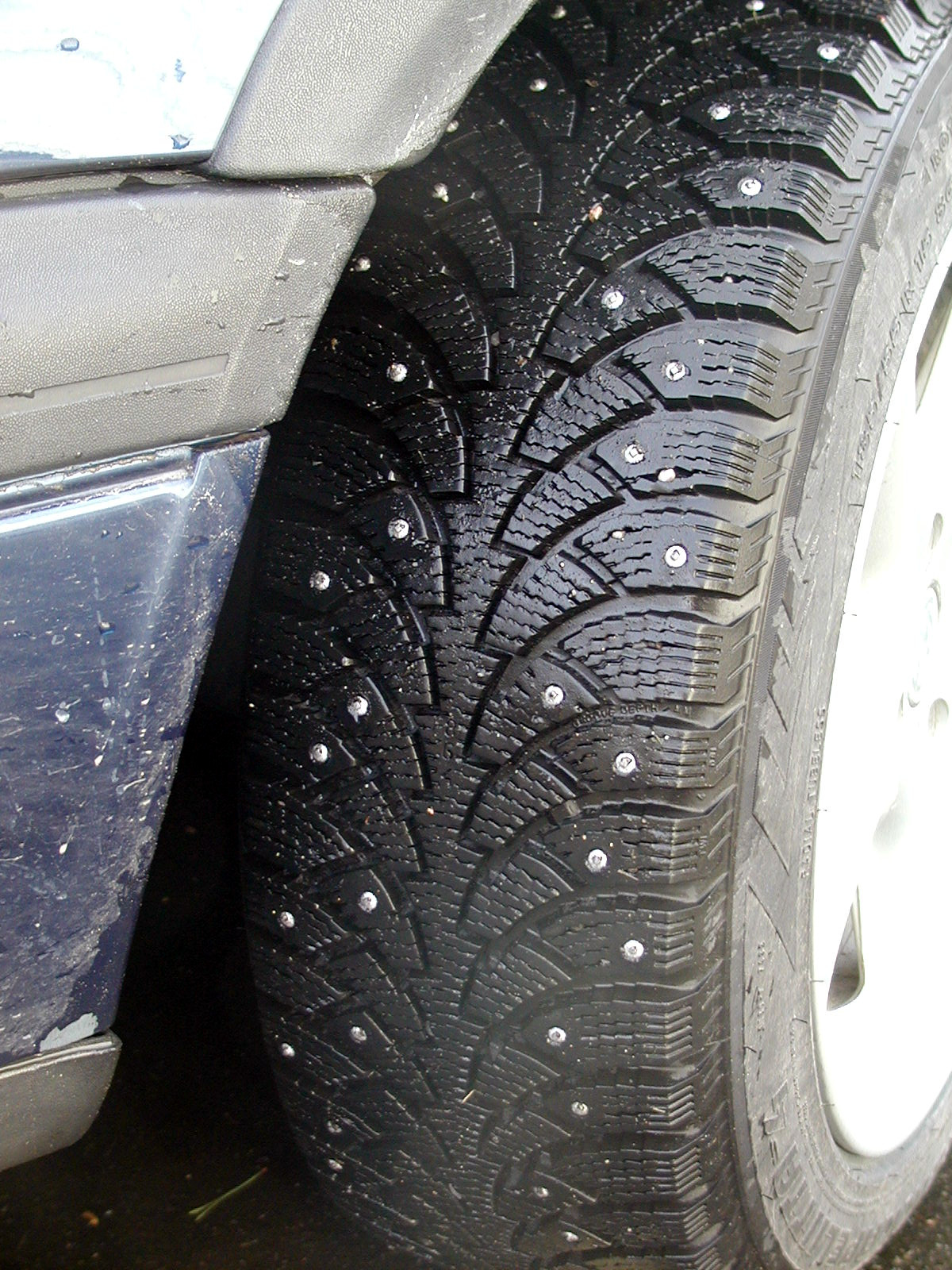
Nokian Hakkapeliitta, a winter tyre fitted with metal studs

=== Passenger car tyres ===
Nokian Tyres produces tyres for passenger cars, SUVs, and vans. Nokian branded tyres are sold in over 60 countries. Nokian Tyres designed the first winter tyres in 1934 and has more winter tyre patents than any other manufacturer. Nokian Tyres is known for its winter tyres, not to be confused with all-season tyres. Nokian winter tyres have been described as a favourite of critics and have been well received in winter test results by several publications. Nokian also has designed some winter tyre models with low rolling resistance, offering lower fuel consumption. Nokian was the first company to produce a tyre that allowed for year-round use by having different tread patterns on the lateral and medial aspect of the tread. One pattern is optimised for winter and another pattern is designed as an all-season pattern.

Nokian Tyres was the first tyre manufacturer in the world to eliminate high-aromatic oils from its production process. Used as plasticising agents in tread production and to facilitate the compounding of rubber, they contain polycyclic aromatic hydrocarbons (PAHs), a carcinogen, and have been replaced by low-aromatic oils. In 2006, Nokian Tyres received a commendation in the Finnish round of the European Business Awards for the Environment.

The demand for Nokian tyres is seasonal, as a high percentage of the company's sales are of winter tyres, but it has reduced seasonal fluctuations by its development of summer and all weather tyres. According to the company, more than 80% of its passenger car and van tyre sales are winter tyres. Winter tyre sales have a strong seasonal characteristic with 30% of retail sales occurring in the ten days after the first snowfall, thus presenting challenges in production and delivery.

Nokian Tyres does not sell to automobile manufacturers, but instead concentrates on the more profitable consumer tyre replacement and premium snow tyre markets. Nokian Tyres has the highest market share of the Finnish passenger car tyre market. The Finnish, Swedish, and Norwegian markets contributed over 40% of Nokian Tyres' corporate net sales in 2008.

The Russian market, Nokian Tyres' largest, contributed 34% of the net sales and captured 26% of the Russian winter tyre market. CEO Kim Gran describes the Russian consumer as having a "love affair" with the Nokian brand citing that it stems from tyres which suit the local weather conditions and a genuine need in the market. The use of winter tyres, which have softer rubber compounds than all-season tyres, results in improved starting, stopping, and steering performance. The Hakkapeliitta brand was, at one time, the only Western tyre brand in Russia having entered the market during the Soviet era in 1964. In contrast to having a Russian tyre factory to benefit from lower tariffs, another tyre company, Continental AG, abandoned Russian tyre production and hopes for Russian membership in the World Trade Organisation will result in lower import tariffs.

In 2009, the North American market accounted for over 10% of the company's net sales. Nokian Tyres has a tyre subsidiary based in LaVergne, Tennessee (USA). In that market, Nokian Tyres sell only to independent dealers, some of whom use the tyre products to fill in gaps in their product lines instead of an exclusive or majority share. This results in some dealers being knowledgeable about specific tyres but not Nokian Tyre's full tyre product range.

=== Commercial vehicle tyres ===
Nokian Tyres manufactures truck and bus tyres sold under the Nokian Hakkapeliitta brand. Steer, traction, and trailer tyres are marketed. Nokian Heavy Tyres Ltd is a manufacturer of special tyres for forestry, industrial machinery, and agriculture. Its products are sold as original equipment as well on the replacement tyre market. Nokian Tyres produces a number of product lines, including the Tractor Industrial 2 and Country King. Nokian Tyres is a world market leader in forestry tyres, which are a key product of the Nokian Heavy Tyres subsidiary. Nokian forestry tyres include the Skidder and Cut-To-Length model lines. The Skidder tyres have a 25 degree bar angle and the Cut-To-Length tyres have a 35 degree bar angle. Bar angle is a tyre tread measurement. Smaller bar angles are associated with higher traction at the expense of increased mud accumulation.

=== Tyre-related products ===
Nokian Tyres also produces materials for retreading and refurbishing used tyres. Nokian Noktop and Kraiburg, an industry competitor, produce most of the retreading materials for the European market. The RoadSnoop Pressure Watch, a tyre pressure monitor for race cars, is also produced by Nokian Tyres.

=== Bicycle ===
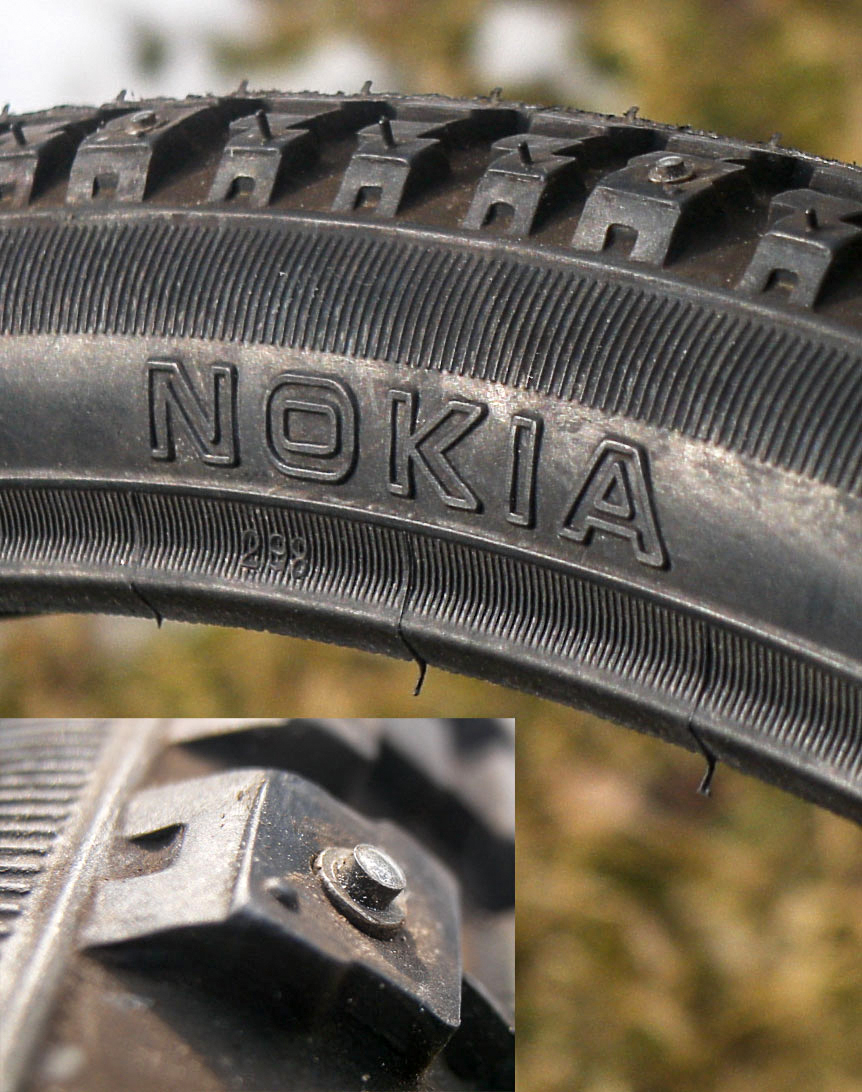
A Nokia bicycle tyre

The history of Finnish made bicycle tires started when Suomen Gummitehdas Osakeyhtiö (Finnish Rubber Factory Limited) started manufacturing bicycle tires and inner tubes in late year of 1924 in the town of Nokia. To the markets the tires arrived in year of 1925. The first trademark of bicycle tires was Suomen Kumi (Finnish Rubber in English).

In 1925, Ensio Salmenkallio, MSc, was appointed head of the tire department after gaining the necessary expertise for tire manufacturing during his excursions in Germany and America. Under Salmenkallio's leadership, all bicycle and car tires were designed and manufactured before he became the technical director of the Finnish Rubber Factory Ltd in 1953 and later CEO of the company in 1959.

In 1935 the Suomalainen Laaturengas (Finnish Quality Tyre in English), later known as SL-35, was presented and became a success story that lasted for decades, selling large quantities for almost 50 years until the early 1980s. The features of the tire was kept superior in terms of rolling and durability.

In 1957 was presented the world's first winter tire for bicycles the Lumirengas, (Snow Tyre in English) which was very soon renamed as Speed-Hakkapeliitta. From the beginning Speed-Hakkapeliitta's were manufactured in moped's tire sizes as well. In sales brochure of the era, the new tire was described with the words: "Invincible winter tire. Holds well both at the start and when braking, prevents side slipping. Its tread clears well from snow. Available as black and grey. Change to Speed-Hakkapeliitta's for a winter. Also for moped's! "

At the end of the 1950s, the annual production of bicycle outer tyres exceeded 1 million tyres for the first time. The black tyre was joined by the fashion colour grey, and Suomalainen Laaturengas gained absolute popularity. Other tread models of summer tyres were also manufactured, but customers did not consider them to be as good as the Suomalainen Laaturengas.

In 1964 was started manufacturing of tungsten-carbide studded Speed-Hakkapeliitta for moped's. The customer magazine of the factory the Nokian Kumiviesti N:o 5-1965 told about the new tyre as follows: "After numerous experiments, the first studded Speed-Hakkapeliittas were introduced to the market in the autumn of 1964. Their success caused such high demand that it exceeded the manufacturer's preliminary calculations. Thousands of moped riders now got a taste of safe and secure winter driving, and so the tyre was found to be effective and durable even in difficult conditions during the winter of 1964-65. Its 90 carbide studs, which are made of the same material as the Kometa-studs on car tyres, withstood stress tests well even in summer conditions."

After a naming contest for moped tires in 1965, Speed-Hakkapeliitta remained a trademark for bicycle winter tires.

In 1971 started manufacturing of first studded bicycle tyres (studded Speed-Hakkapeliitta).

In 1974 Oy Nokia Ab Kumiteollisuus (Nokia's Rubber industry) centered the production of bicycle tyres and all inner tubes to a new purpose-built factory in the town of Lieksa. The factory was inaugurated by president Urho Kekkonen in late 1974 and actual production was started in 2 April 1975. At its first full production year Lieksa factory produced 760 000 bicycle outer tires.

In late 1970's popularity of touring cycling grew and bicycle became a year-round means of transport. Tungsten-carbide studded Speed-Hakkapeliitta was re-launched for winter cycling with a new name of Nasta-Hakkapeliitta (later known as Hakkapeliitta Stud and Suomi Tyres Stud 62A). Speed-Hakkapeliitta with same tread pattern but without studs was still manufactured in 1980s.

The peak production of bicycle tyres and tubes was reached in 1995, when the Lieksa factory produced 2 million tyres and 1.8 million inner tubes per year.

In the turn of millennium Nokian Tyres was one of the five bicycle tire manufacturers in Europe and the only one in Nordic countries. The product catalogue included 250 products at in standard-, touring-, mountain- and racing tire categories. Nokian Tyres was the world largest manufacturer of studded bicycle tires. All products were manufactured at the Lieksa factory, which mainly operated in three shifts 340 days in a year. About third of the products went to the European bicycle manufacturers. Main market areas was Northern Europe, Central Europe and North America.

Nokian Tyres' successful strategy was to focus on modern, high-quality and high-priced products in narrow specialty product segments in order to avoid direct competition with cheap imports from the Far East to Europe. These included downhill and all-terrain tyres as well as winter tyres.

The products were mainly developed in close co-operation with European bicycle manufacturers, sports cyclists and cyclists, so that customers always received products that met the latest requirements. Knowledge of northern conditions was an important product development asset for the company. The two main areas in the development of bicycle tires were the development of the tread and the material. Attention was also paid to the tire's rolling properties, durability, safety, riding comfort and appearance.

Nokian Tyres was forerunner in manufacturing clean environmentally friendly bicycle tyres. It was studied and tested the replacement of high-aromatic oil with purified low-aromatic oils which are non-carcinogenic. The replacement of harmful oils with clean, low-aromatic oils, for example Rape-seed oil in the production started in year 2000.

Nokian Tyres also manufactured products that were specifically tailored for countries where the cycling culture placed special requirements on bicycle tires, as well as for organisational customers. Examples included puncture-resistant tires developed specifically for the Dutch market and equipped with reflective strips and tread profiles designed for paved bicycle paths in the Netherlands, as well as mail bike tires for postal services of Germany and Finland.

In a year of 2000 Nokian Tyres manufactured 1.2 million bicycle tyres and 1.1 million inner tubes. At the end of the year Nokian Unitube line was sold to Rubena Tyres in Czech Republic, which later served as a contract manufacturer for Nokian Tyres.

In addition to the novelties of the era, the 2003 sales programme included many traditional standard models, such as the Sydney summer tyres, which were used as initial installation tyres in the European bicycle industry, or the popular steel and tungsten- carbide studded winter tyres, which were partly released in the 1990s, as well as the company's all-time best-sold off-road tyre NBX 2.1, whose popularity was boosted by continuous test victories in the international bicycling press.

In 2004 Nokian Tyres sold bicycle tyre business including Lieksa factory to Suomen Rengastehdas Oy (Finnish Tyre Factory Ltd) which continued manufacturing with Nokian brand until all the products was changed to under Suomi Tyres brand beginning in 2010.

Beginning from 18. September 2019 Lieksa Tyres Oy continued the bicycle tire development and operations of Lieksa factory until rising energy and material costs forced it to file bankruptcy on 17 April, 2023.

In November 2023 rally car tire manufacturer DMACK announced the acquisition of the bankruptcy estates of Lieksa Tyres Ltd and Suomi Tyres brand name. In March 2024 DMACK Nordic Oy announced that it was started production in Lieksa again and was specialized in bicycle winter tires. In February 2025 Dmack Nordic announced an investment program of 2 million euros to machines, toolings and programs of Lieksa factory. In May 2025 Dmack purchased the whole real estate of the factory including 30 000 m2 of manufacturing space from Lieksa industrial village. In 2025 Dmack Nordic manufactured 150 000 bicycle tires in a year and in January 2026 it announced it is going to fivefold tire production by the year 2030, continue investments in Lieksa and enlarge marketing to Central Europe and North America. In January 2026 Dmack Nordic started production of special quality bicycle summer tires and launched its first bicycle summer tire catalogue (including popular Finnish classics from decades gone by). In October 2026 Dmack Nordic told that it will become the first bicycle tyre manufacturer using RFID tags in its tyres.

== Vianor tyre chain ==
Nokian Tyres owns 100% of Vianor Holding Oy, which administers Vianor, a tyre chain of company owned and franchised stores. The Vianor name is derived from the Latin phrase "northern way" or "northern road", and reflects the tyre chain's image as a tyre specialist for winter conditions.

Vianor is the largest and most extensive tyre franchise in the Nordic countries with approximately 170 company-owned retail outlets and around 800 outlets in total including franchises. Company-owned outlets are located in the Switzerland, Russia, Norway, Finland, Sweden, and the United States. The twelve United States outlets are located in the American states of Vermont, New Hampshire, New York and Massachusetts. Countries with only franchised outlets include Ukraine, Estonia, Latvia, Lithuania, Kazakhstan, Armenia, Moldova, Georgia, Belarus, Poland, Germany, Czech Republic, Romania, Slovakia and Bulgaria.

Nokian Tyres has operated retail tyre stores in Norway since 1987, when it acquired Larsen & Lund, and since 1998 in Sweden and Latvia. The Vianor name was launched in 1999 coinciding with the company's expansion into Finland and Estonia.

Vianor sells two million tyres annually, including Michelin and Bridgestone brands as well as Nokian tyres. Car servicing and a tyre hotel, facilities for customers to store summer or winter tyres during the off-season, are also offered.

== Tyre facilities ==
=== Nokia, Finland production and testing facilities ===
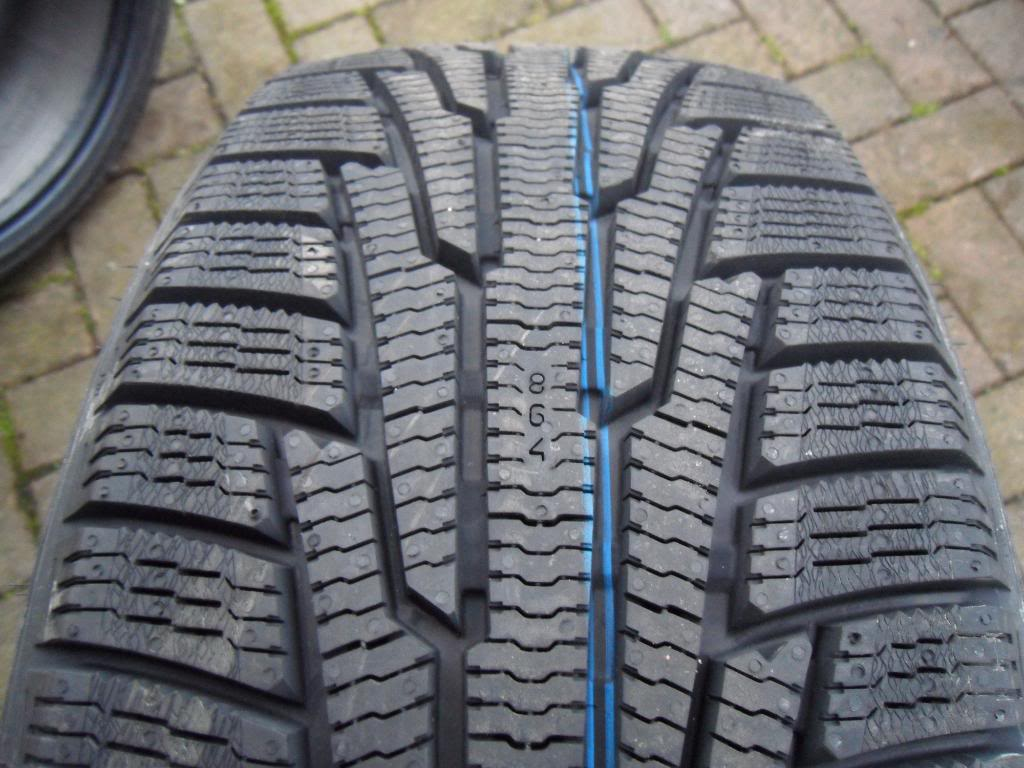
Deep tread pattern and multiple sipes in a Nokian Hakkapeliitta R winter tyre tread. The numbers 4, 6, 8 in the tread (in mm) indicate the depth of the remaining tread. The number 8 becomes unreadable as the tread wears to a depth of less than 8 mm.

Nokian Tyres produces 23,000 tyres per day at a factory in Nokia, Finland, and 200,000 tyres a year under the Bridgestone brand name. The original factory was built in 1904, the current one in 1945; it has expanded several times since then. Nokian Tyres has 27 assembly lines at its Finnish plant. The plant uses radio frequency devices to monitor the inventory of materials used to manufacture tyres, such as the 100-metre long strips of rubber tread. Shortages of rubber tread can halt production and so keeping an adequate supply of materials increases efficiency. Despite trade journals discussing this technique, Nokian declines to confirm its production methods.

The company has a 30-hectare (74-acre) testing facility in Nokia, where it road tests tyres between April and November. From November to May, tests are carried out at its Ivalo Proving Grounds in Arctic Lapland. The Ivalo Proving Ground is the only permanent winter tyre testing facility in the world. Because of the short summer in Finland, Nokian tests summer tyres at other locations. During the winter, the testing of summer tyres takes place in South Africa. Nokian also tests tyres at the Applus+ IDIADA facilities in El Vendrell, Spain, and the ATP facilities in Papenburg, Germany.

=== Vsevolozhsk, Russia factory ===
The Vsevolozhsk factory in Leningrad Oblast, Russia, was established by Nokian Tyres in 2005. Following Russia's invasion of Ukraine, Nokian Tyres condemned the war and announced a controlled withdrawal from Russia, stating that the war and tightening sanctions made continued operations there infeasible. In March 2023, Nokian Tyres completed the sale of its Russian operations to the Russian company Tatneft for €285 million. The company stated that the sale ended all Nokian Tyres operations in Russia.

The former Nokian factory continues to operate under the name Ikon Tyres as part of the Tatneft group. It is no longer owned or operated by Nokian Tyres. Ikon Tyres states that the plant has an annual production capacity of 17 million passenger-car and SUV tyres and employs more than 1,400 people.

=== Dayton Tennessee, United States factory ===
In May 2017, Nokian announced the construction of a new factory in Dayton, Tennessee, with an annual production capacity of 4 million tyres. The facility would employ about 400 people, cost €330 million to build, and expected to start production by 2020. In addition to producing tires, the facility would house an on-site distribution facility with a storage capacity of 600,000 units. The company expects to double its North American sales by 2023. Nokian began hiring workers for the plant in February 2019, and sent its first group of employees for training to its Finnish and Russian factories in May 2019. The Dayton plant officially opened on 2 October 2019. The company plans to have up to 150 employees by the end of the year.

=== Contract production of tyres ===
Nokian Tyres licenses production of its tyres to companies in the United States (Bridgestone's LaVergne, Tennessee, plant), Slovakia (Matador, Puchov, plant), Indonesia (PT Gajah Tunggal/Giti), and the People's Republic of China (Giti Tire), as well as contract manufacture of agriculture and industrial tyres in Spain and India. In the past, some United States contract manufacturing was done by Cooper Tire's Findlay, Ohio, plant. Contract manufacture by Giti Tire includes production of up to 500,000 Nokian summer tyres with expansion up to 1.5 million tyres per year. Some Nokian agricultural and industrial tyres were made under contract by the Tofan Grup in Romania for two years until December 1999, when Nokian Tyres withdrew, citing quality standards. Contract manufacture of these types of heavy tyres was then undertaken by Michelin at its Polish plant, Stomil-Olsztyn, from 2000 until 2005, when Nokian began to shift contract manufacture of industrial tyres to Bridgestone's factory in Bilbao, Spain and agricultural tyres to Balkrishna Tyres in Bhiwadi, India.

== See also ==
- Nokian Footwear
