= Tottijärvi =

- Former municipality
- Tottijärven kunta Tottijärvi kommun
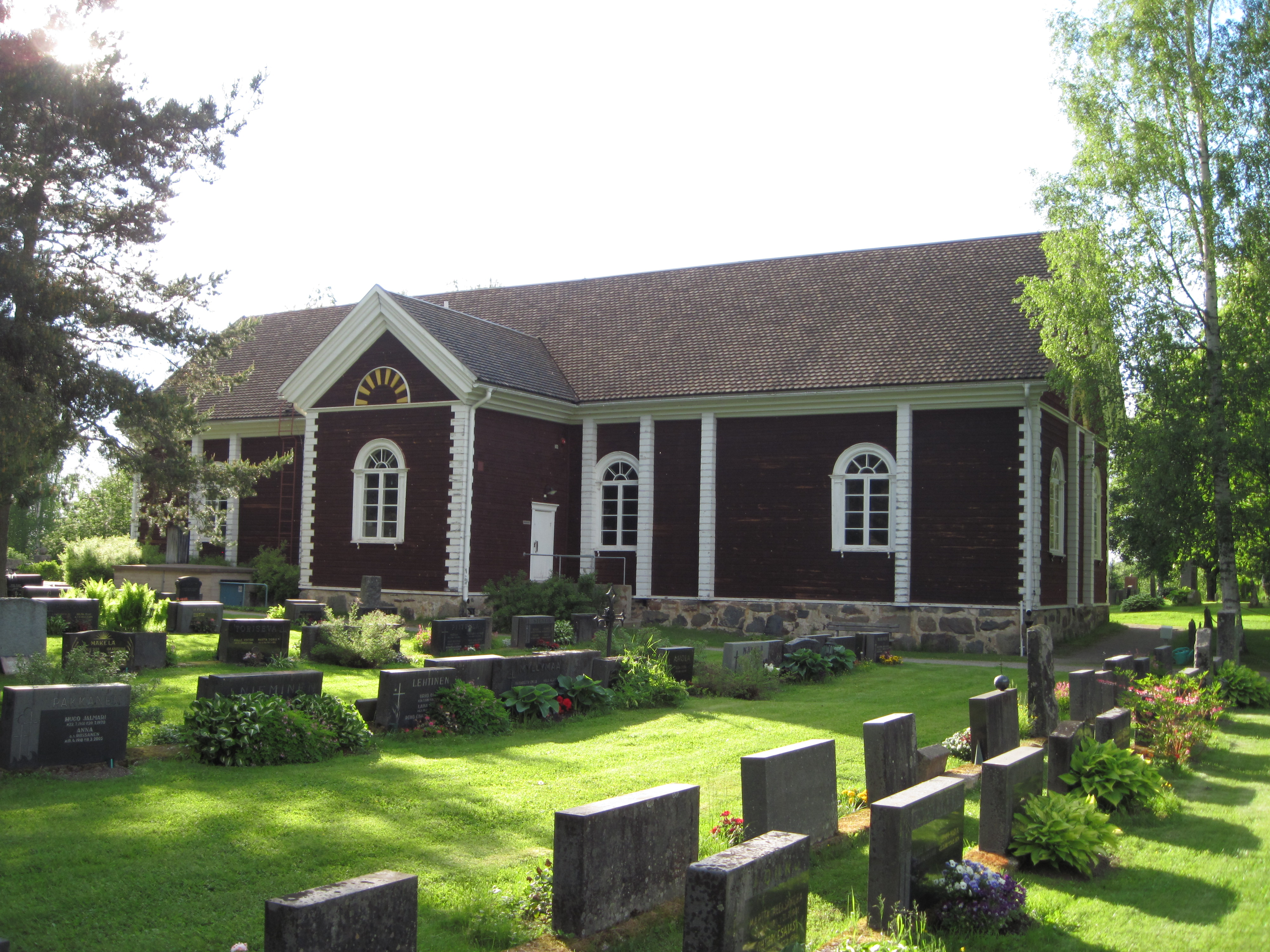
- Tottijäri Church, built in 1841.

- Coat of arms

- Coordinates: 61°23′52″N 023°20′34″E
- Country: Finland
- Region: Pirkanmaa
- Established: 1906
- Consolidated: 1976

Area
  - Land: 87.2 km^{2} (33.7 sq mi)

Population (1975)
  - Total: 1,052
  - Density: 12.1/km^{2} (31.2/sq mi)
- Time zone: UTC+2 (EET)
  - Summer (DST): UTC+3 (EEST)
- Climate: Dfc

Tottijärvi (Finnish pronunciation: [ˈtotːiˌjærʋi]) is a former municipality in Nokia, Finland. It is located by the lake Pyhäjärvi, about 30 kilometres southwest of the city of Tampere. The population of Tottijärvi is 717 (2008).

== History ==
The history of Tottijärvi dates back to the early 14th century. According to a legend, it was named after the dog of the chieftain Matti Kurki. Kurki drowned his dog Totti into a lake, as it was making noise during an ambush and later the dog began to haunt him. The Tottijärvi Manor was established in 1416. It was owned by the Kurki of Laukko family. The manor was destroyed in the 1918 Finnish Civil War.

Tottijärvi was originally a part of the Greater Pirkkala, which was one of the 10 original sockens of the historical province of Satakunta, and later a part of the Vesilahti municipality. The Tottijärvi parish was established in 1685 and the municipality of Tottijärvi in 1906. It was annexed with the town of Nokia in 1976.
