= Nokian Footwear =

Finnish manufacturer of rubber boots

The brand logo of Finnish Rubber Works from 1965−1966.

Nokian Footwear (Finnish: Nokian Jalkineet) is a Finnish manufacturer of rubber boots. It was a part of Nokia (which is today known for its mobile phones) from 1967 to 1990, when it split into its own company. It was acquired by the Finnish company Berner in 2005.

== History ==
The company's history extends back to 1898, when Eduard Polón and a group of other Finnish businessmen decided to establish the company Suomen Gummitehdas Oy (Finnish Rubber Works Ltd) in Helsinki. After operating for a few years, the factory began to produce rubber galoshes, which competed successfully against Russian imports. After several years of production in Helsinki, the factory was moved to the town of Nokia. Soon after, the company began to use the brand Nokia, communicating Finnishness, and to distinguish itself from the cheaper Russian products.

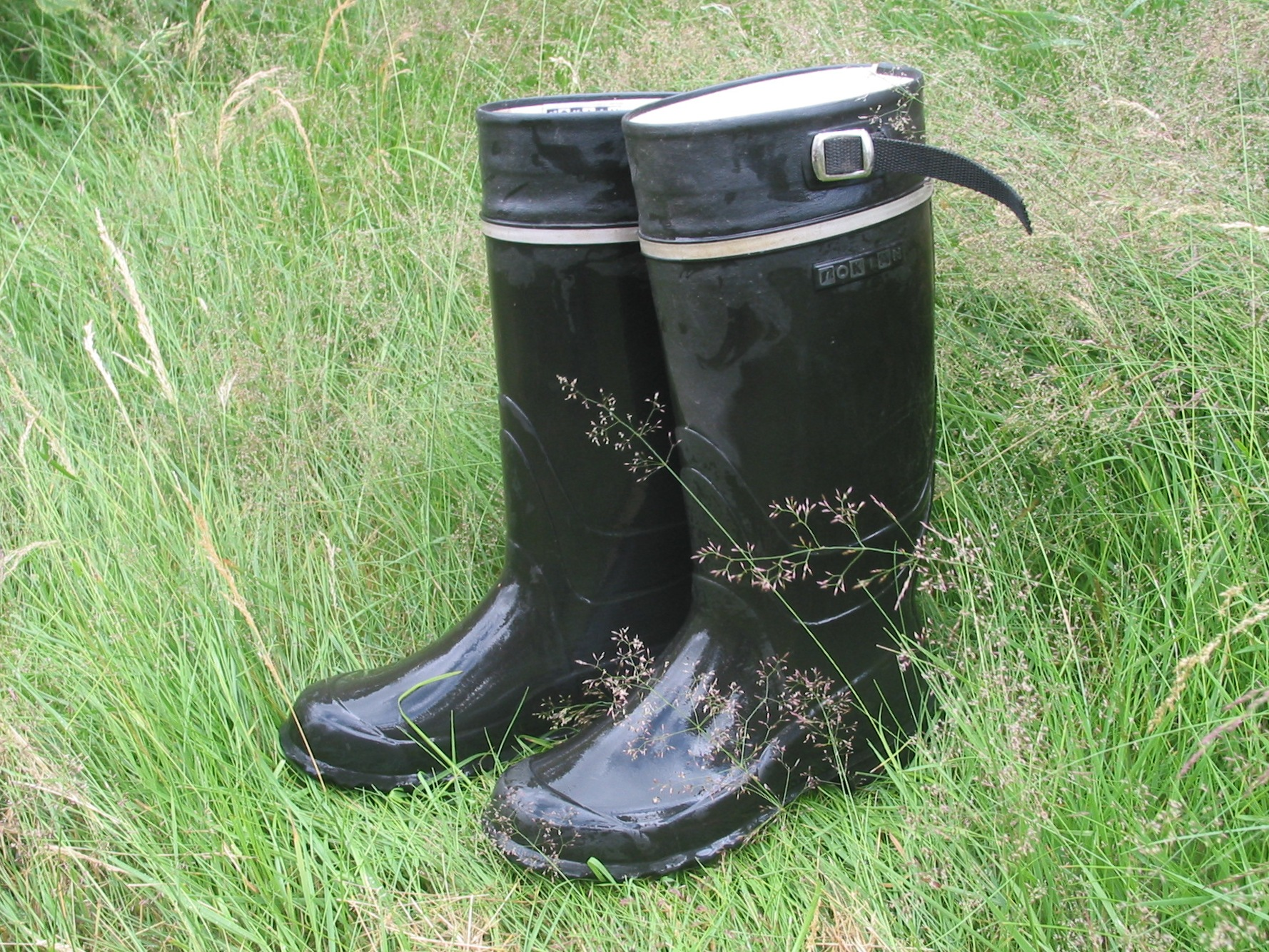
The Kontio model of Nokian boots was launched in 1973

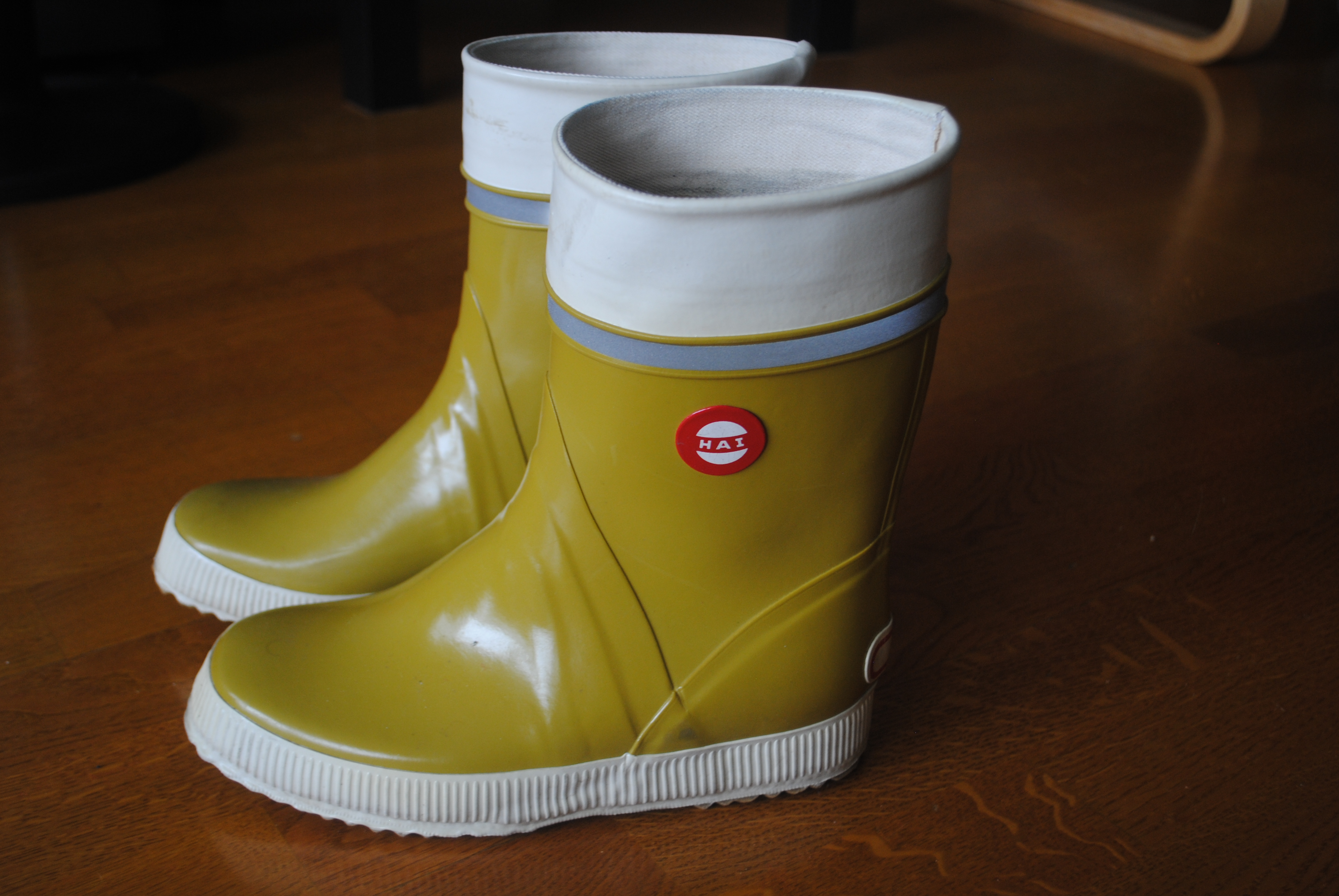
Hai boots

Suomen Gummitehdas was soon manufacturing rubber goods ranging from machine belts to hoses and vehicle tyres. Later Suomen Gummitehdas Oy changed its name to a more modern Suomen Kumitehdas Oy. In 1967, Suomen Kumitehdas and Kaapelitehdas (The Cable Company) merged with the forest and power industry company Nokia Osakeyhtiö (Nokia Company) to form Nokia Corporation, the current telecommunications corporation. The group's fields of business were the rubber, cable and forest industries as well as electricity generation and electronics.

At the end of the 1980s, the different industrial sectors of Nokia Corporation decided to focus on their own areas of expertise. Nokian Tyres left in 1988 to form its own, independent company and two years later, in 1990, Nokian Footwear was founded. The parent company Nokia Corporation focused on telecommunications and divested itself of all of its other divisions. Nokian is "Nokia" in the genitive, thus Nokian Footwear meaning "Footwear of Nokia".

In 2005, the Finnish family business Berner bought Nokian Footwear and assumed ownership of the Nokian Footwear brands and closely guarded rubber recipes. They sell retro design classics such as Hai and Kontio rubber boots.

== Milestones ==
- 1898 – Finnish Rubber Works Ltd (Suomen Gummitehdas Oy) founded in Helsinki.
- 1904 – Factory moves to the town of Nokia.
- 1967 – Finnish Rubber Works, The Cable Company and Nokia Company merged, thereby forming Nokia Corporation.
- 1973 – Kontio, a classic full-length rubber boot for men, introduced.
- 1990 – Split from Nokia Corporation. Nokian Footwear Ltd. founded.
- 2005 – Berner acquires Nokian Footwear.
