= Tesoma =

District in Tampere, Finland

Coordinates: 61.505724°N 23.609432°E

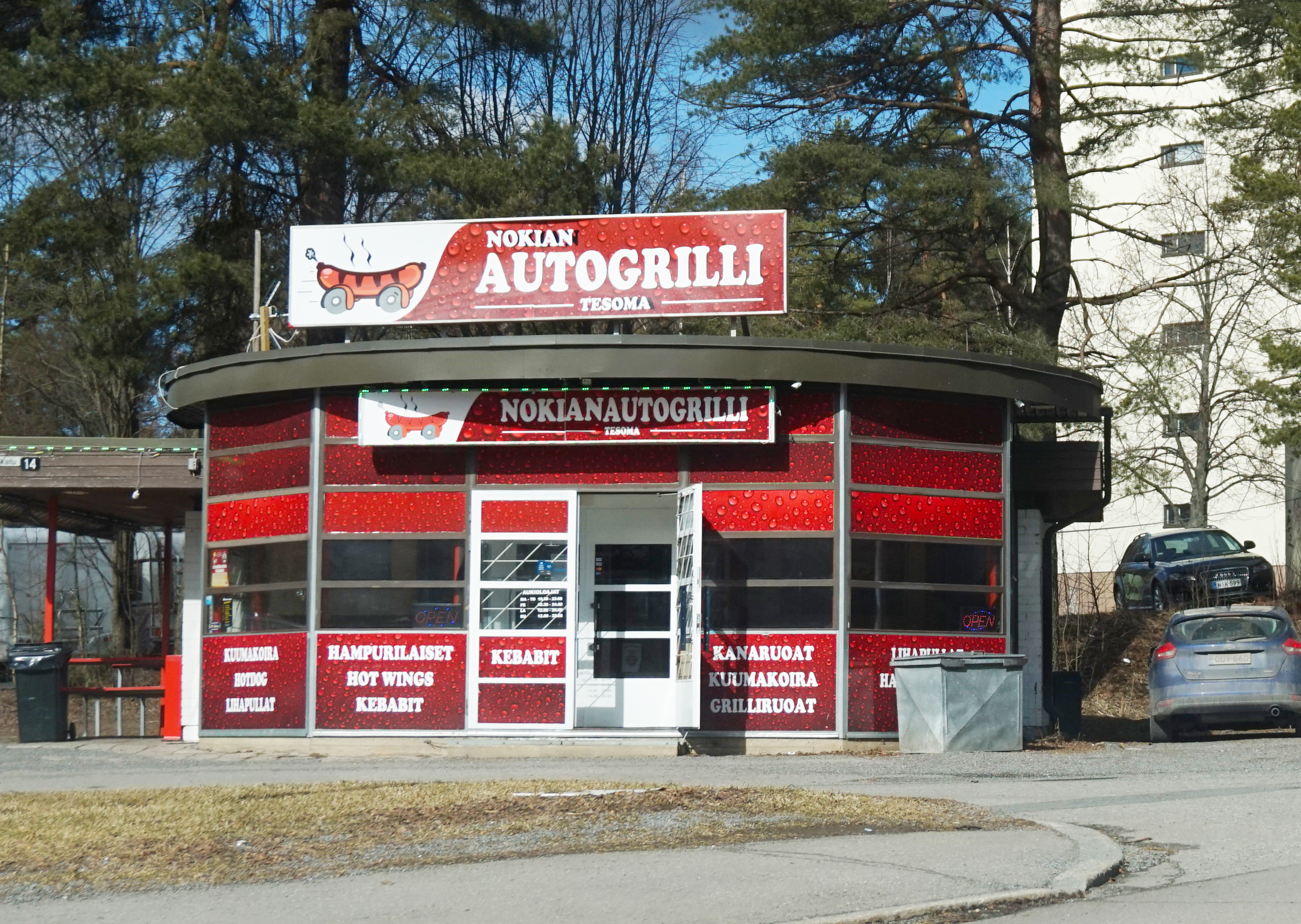
Tesoma Grill in Tesomajärvi

Tesoma is a district in Tampere, Finland, located west of the city centre. It largely comprises Lake Tesoma with its surroundings, including the quarters: Epilänharju, Tohloppi, Haukiluoma, Lamminpää, Myllypuro, Ikuri, Ristimäki and Tesomajärvi.

Tesoma features the Tesoma Swimming Hall, an indoor swimming pool; the Tesoma Ice Rink, an ice rink that serves as home to the Tampereen Ilves Naiset; the Tesoma Church; and the Westeri shopping center.
