= Tesomajärvi =

City district in Tampere, Finland

Coordinates: 61.5063°N 23.6172°E

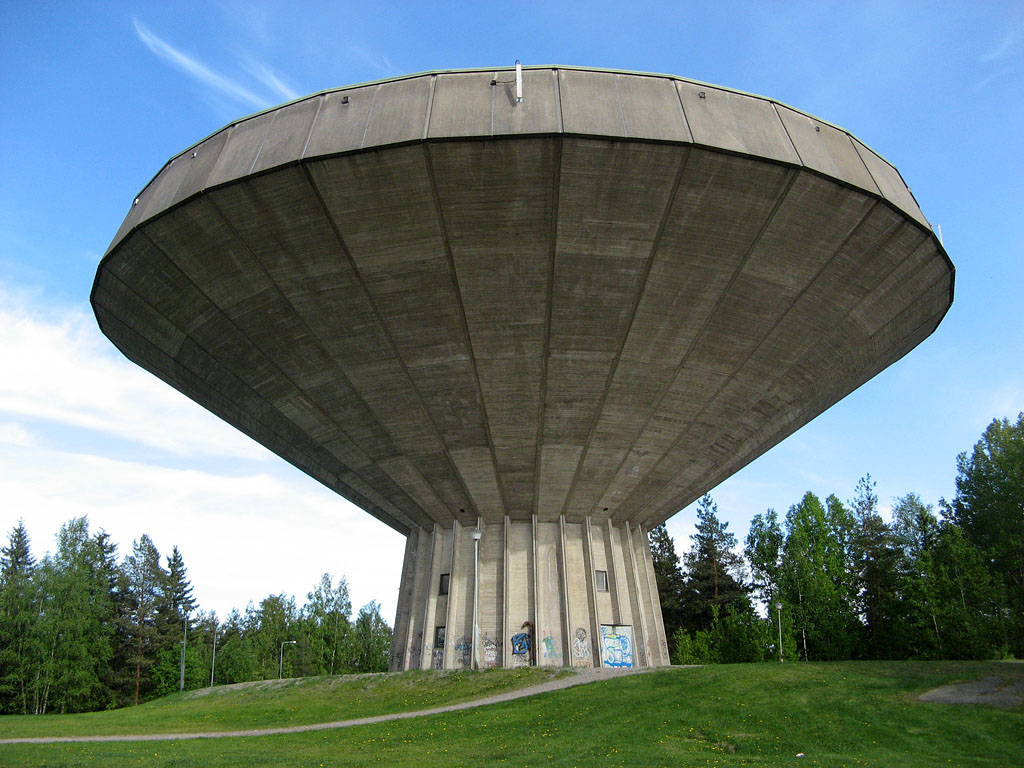
Tesoma's water tower in Tesomajärvi

Tesomajärvi (sometimes speaking only Tesoma) is a district in the southwestern part of Tampere, Finland, belonging part of Tesoma's planning area. 1,280 people lived on Tesomajärvi in 2015. Although the population of Tampere is growing, the population of Tesomajärvi has clearly decreased from about 1,500 in 1996. The districts surrounding Tesomajärvi from the south clockwise are Rahola and Ristimäki, Kalkku, Ikuri, Haukiluoma, Lamminpää, Tohloppi and again Ristimäki. Tesomajärvi is one of Tampere's regional centers. In addition to Ristimäki, most of the commercial and public services in the Tesoma area (such as the Westeri shopping centre) are located in the district. In addition, the district includes the Tesoma's indoor swimming pool and ice rink.

Lake Tesoma, about 300 meters in diameter and six hectares in area, has a city beach on both sides; naturally the shores of the lake are natural. The deepest point of the lake is six meters. Myllyoja is the descent of a spring-based lake on the northeastern shore of the lake, the ditch runs through the districts of Myllypuro and Ikuri to Nokia's Lake Vihnus, its eastern end.

Tesomajärvi is a suburb whose housing stock consists mainly of apartment buildings built in the 1960s. The mushroom-shaped Tesoma's water tower, completed in 1970, is located on a hill above the primary school, which is Tampere's fourth highest place. The volume of the water tower is 5,000 m³. Like Hervanta, Tesomajärvi was previously known as a restless problem suburb, which is why in the 1980s Tesoma became its own block police unit. Tesoma's services have been purposefully developed. The services of Tesoma have been gentrified and the original inhabitants obsolete. In this way, the district has calmed down considerably.
