= Tohloppi =

City district in Tampere, Finland

Coordinates: 61°30′47.68297″N 23°37′57.76104″E

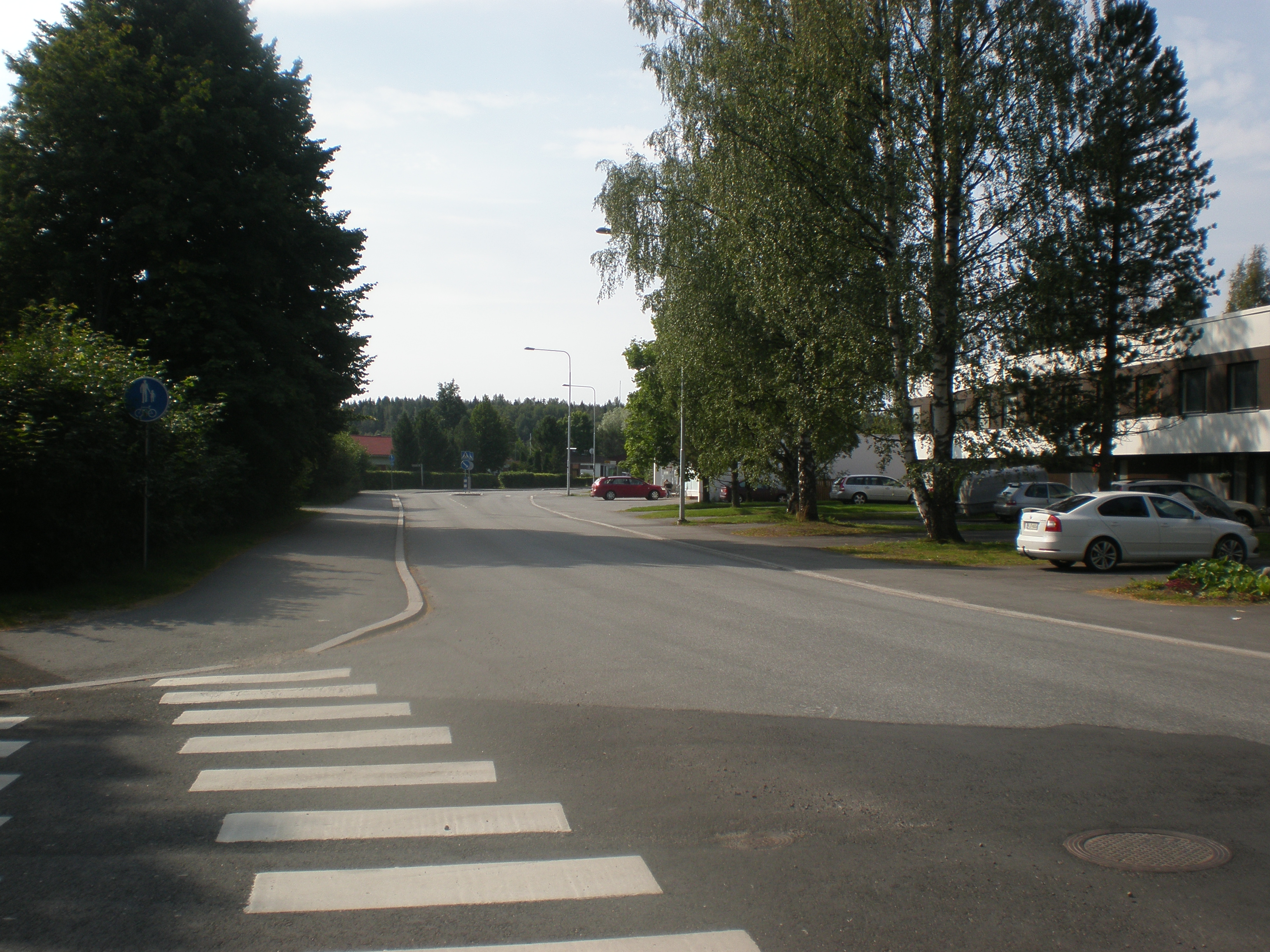
Tohlopinkatu, a main street of Tohloppi

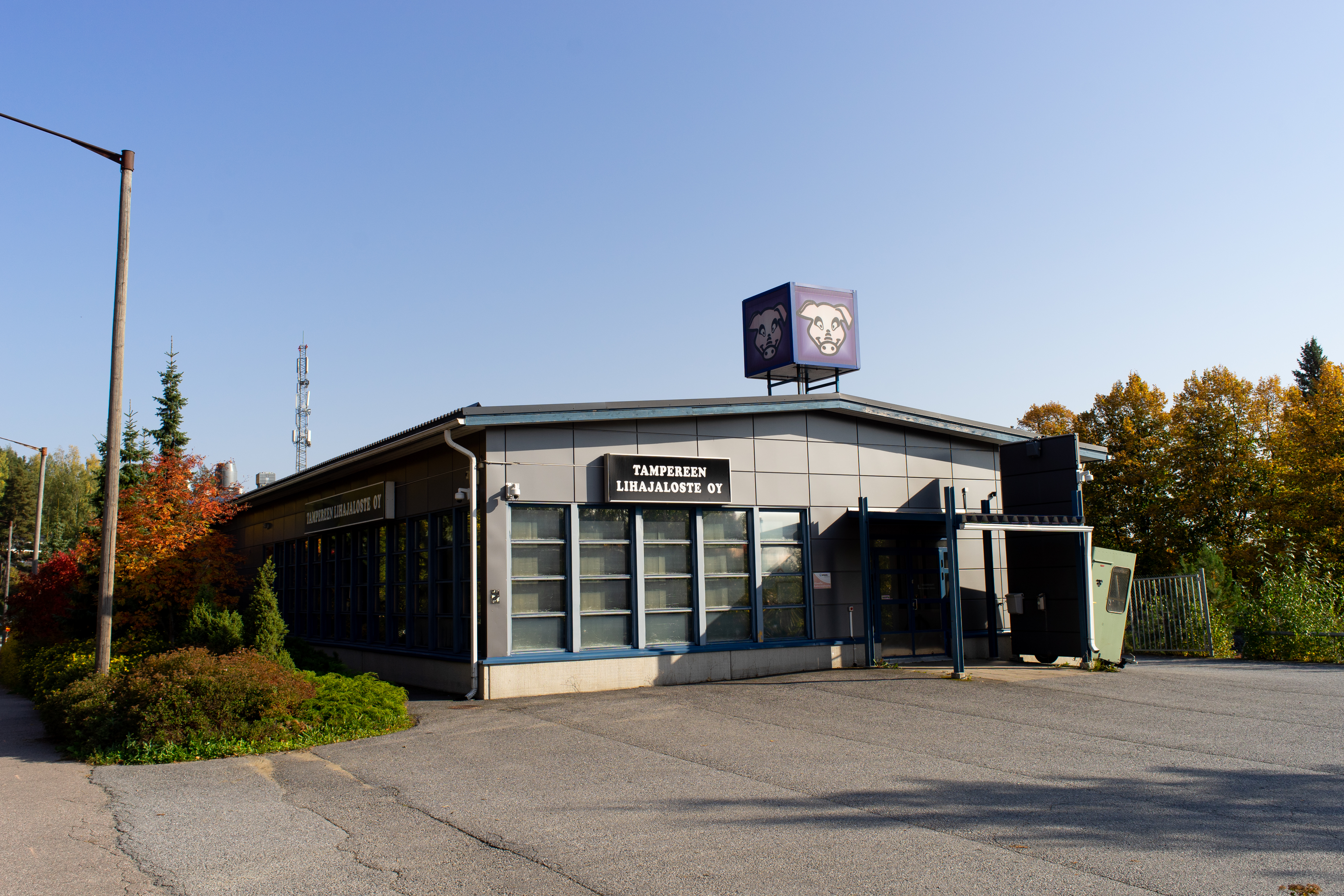
Tampereen Lihajaloste Oy's luncheon meat premises in Tohloppi

Tohloppi is a district of Tampere, Finland. It is located in western part of Tampere, about seven kilometers from the city center near the Tesomajärvi district. The other neighboring parts of the district also are Ikuri, Lamminpää, Epilänharju and Ristimäki. There is also a lake by the same name (which is part of the Lake Pyhäjärvi basin) in the district with one island called the Tohloppi Island (Tohlopinsaari).

Yleisradio's office on the shores of Lake Tohloppi, which produces a large proportion of Yle TV2's broadcasts, is often said to be located in Tohloppi. However, the office is located in the Ristimäki district, although on the shores of Lake Tohloppi. In 2016, the Tesoma's sports hall was completed in the district, which is used by, among others, the basketball club Raholan Pyrkivä. Tohloppi also has a nature trail for hikers and joggers.

== History ==
Lake Tohloppi formed approximately 8000 years ago for melting, after the previous iceage, the Younger Dryas ended. Surrounding the lake Tohloppi are abstract formations combounding of the volcanic rock areas. One may encounter there solidified gravel known as the conglomerate, whose origin is typical after the volcanic activity.

The village of Tohloppi, or Tohloppila, which belonged to the parish of Pirkkala, was already mentioned in medieval documents; in 1466, a man named Per Tohlopintha served as a juror. According to the 1540 land register, the village had four houses: Raso, Epilä, Kohma and Vaakkola. During the Great Partition in the late 18th century, the first three houses were located in a fragmented group in the area of the later Winter factory, and Vaakkola was separated from Vaakkolammi. Lake Tohloppi is mentioned in the map of the Great Partition from 1768. The Tohloppi area was transferred from the municipality of Pohjois-Pirkkala to the city of Tampere at the beginning of 1937. After Epilä changed from the name of the house to the name of the area, the name Tohloppi remained used for a long time only as the name of the lake, until a detached houses and terraced houses began to form on the northwest side of the lake in the 1960s. Thus, the current district of Tohloppi is only a small part of the former village of Tohloppila. The town plan of Tohloppi was confirmed in 1967. The street name Käräjätörmä refer to the old place, which was probably home to a medieval courtroom.
