= Epilä =

City district in Tampere, Finland

Coordinates: 61°30′24.0001″N 23°40′05.9999″E

- District
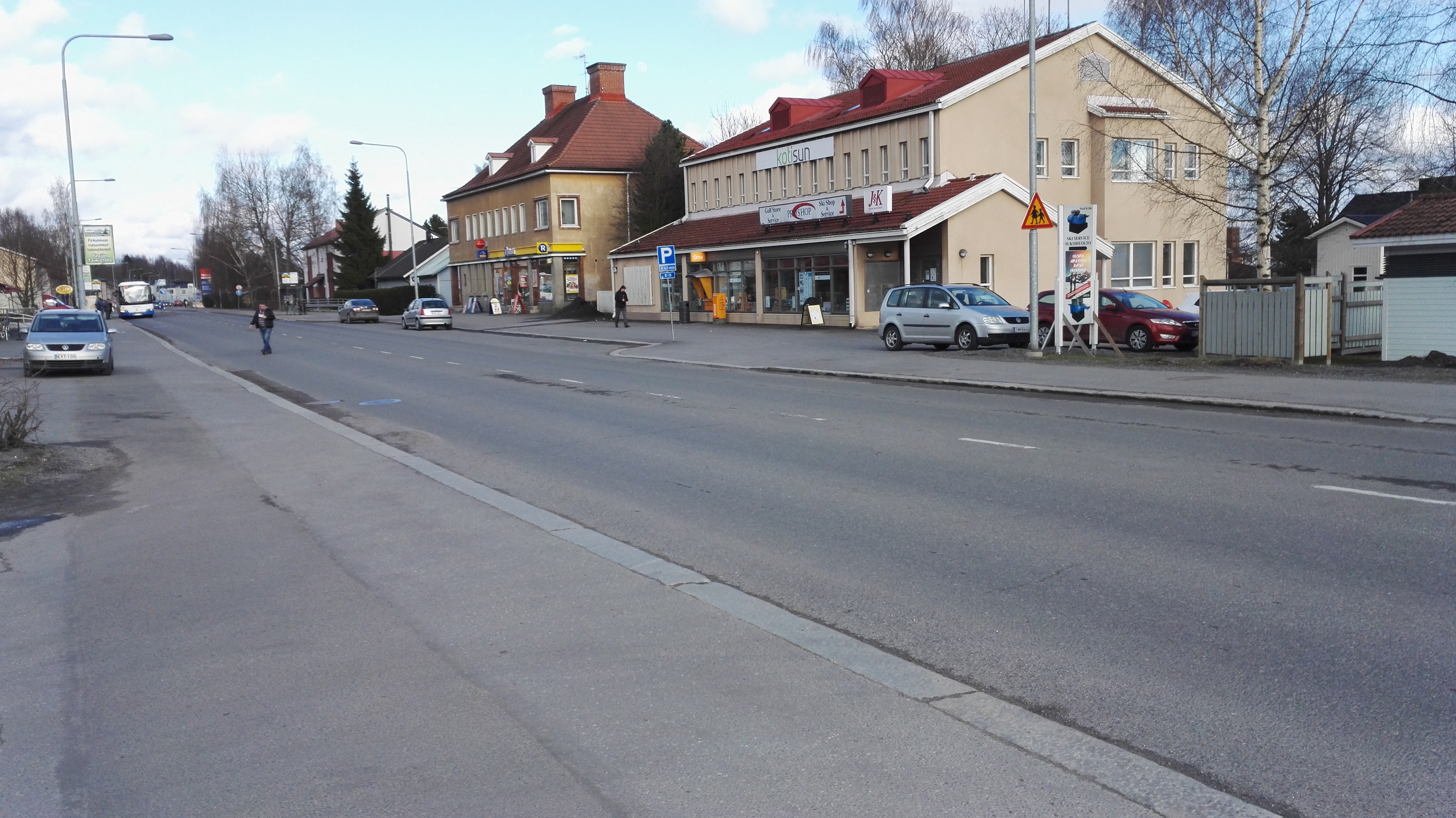
- Epilä along the Pispala Highway
- Interactive map of Epilä
- Country: Finland
- Region: Pirkanmaa
- Sub-region: Tampere
- Metropolitan area: Tampere

Epilä is a district in Tampere, Finland. The area is bordered on the north by the Tampere–Pori railway and Lielahti, on the east by Hyhky's Vaakonkatu, on the west by Rahola and on the south by Kaarila.

Epilä has been permanently inhabited since the 16th century. Epilä, located in the present Winter area, is mentioned in the 1540 land register as a house belonging to the village of Tohloppi, the parish of Pirkkala, which was owned by Heikki Epi at that time. The name is possibly based on the Swedish male given name Ebbe. In 1759–1836, Epilä was the office of the chaplain of the Harju Chapel Parish. There have been pastures of Kaarila Manor in the area. During the Finnish Civil War, in March-April 1918, fierce battles were fought in Epilä as part of the Battle of Tampere; the Red Guard, led by Aatto Koivunen, defeated the Whites, led by Swedish Colonel Hjalmarson, on several occasions. The fierce offensive battle took place on March 26, 1918.

After the completion of the Tampere–Pori railway in 1895, Epilä railway station was opened, and a new residential and industrial area began to develop around it. Thus the house name had become a region name. The Epilä area, along with the other western suburbs of Tampere, was moved from the then North Pirkkala to the city of Tampere at the beginning of 1937. The joint town plan of the Epilä, Kaarila and Hyhky districts was confirmed in 1953. The Epilä railway stop's shutdown was decommissioned in 1979, when it was used for passenger transport until it was opened.

For most of the 20th century, Epilä was an industrial area, but today it is mainly a residential area dominated by detached houses. During the industrial era, Epilä operated e.g. Uusi Kivipaino Oy book publisher and Winter's paint factory.

== See also ==
- Epilänharju
