= Pispala =

City area in Tampere, Finland

Coordinates: 61.5061°N 23.7025°E

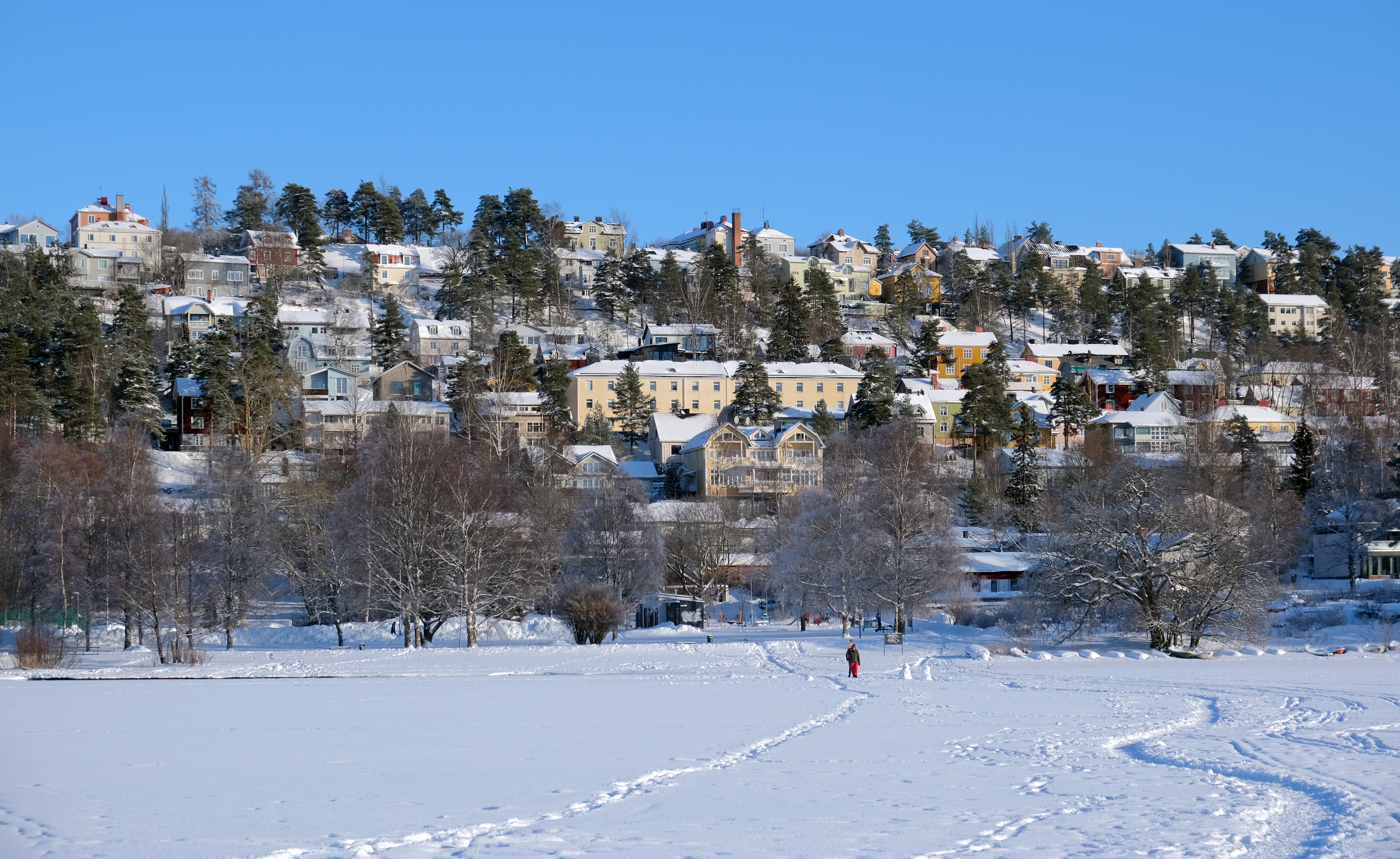
Pispala viewed from Pyhäjärvi

Pispala is a city area 2.5 km from the centre of Tampere, Finland. It is located on the northern slope of Pispalanharju, the highest esker in Finland.

Together with Pyynikki, Pispala is widely considered the most beautiful area of Tampere and tourists are often guided there for the view and the unique urban design features of the area. A monument to the Finnish poet Lauri Viita is located near the highest point of the ridge and there is a famous landmark in the area called the Shot tower (Finnish: Pispalan haulitorni.).

== History ==
Pispala is named after the House of Pispa, which had the obligation to house the bishops during their travel. It was first mentioned in 1492. Pispala was a rural area until as recently as 1869, at the time there were only two farms in the area: Pispala and Provasti. As Tampere was industrialised, Pispala grew without a unified local development plan, resulting in unique building styles and solutions.

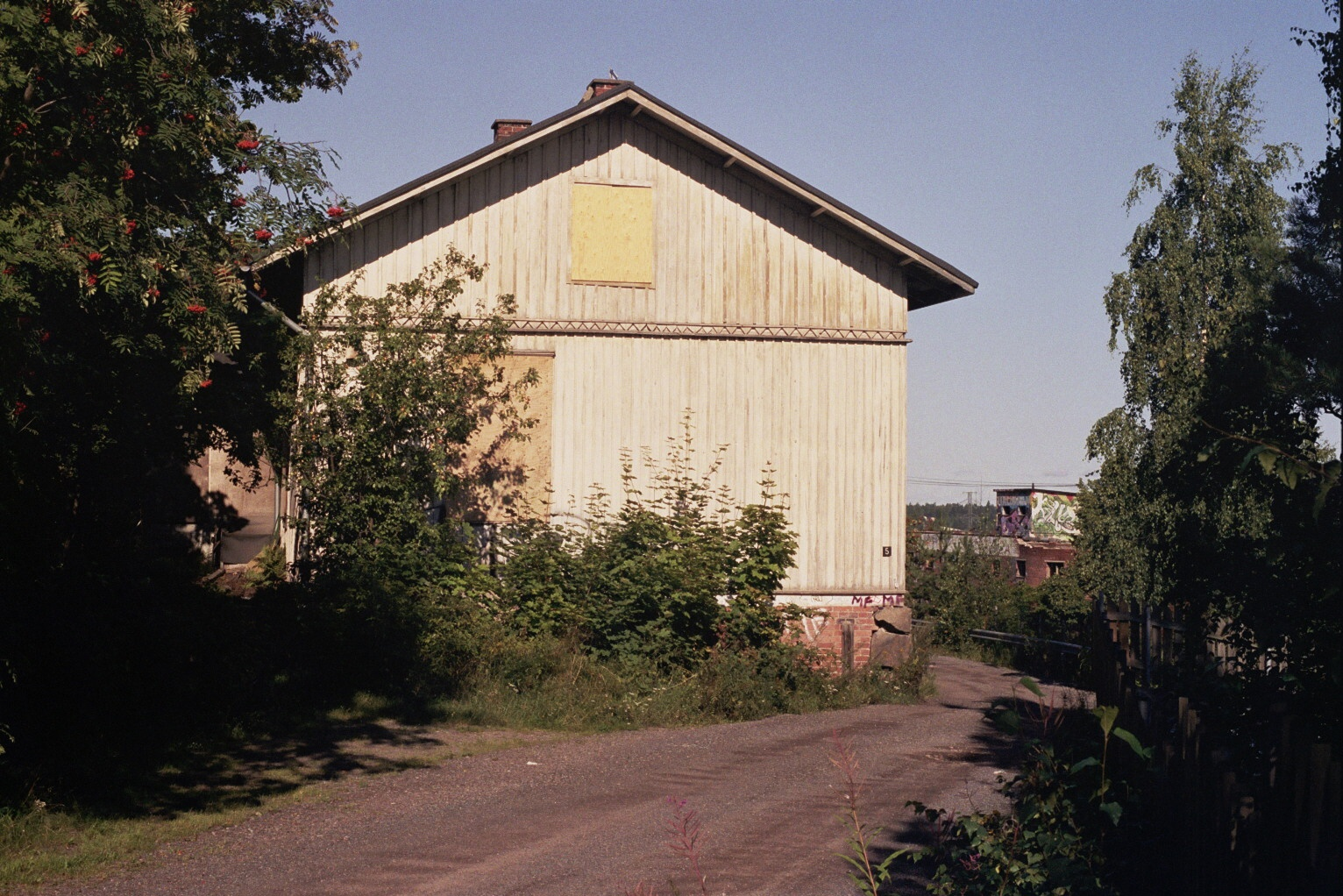
A typical wooden house in Pispala.

Specifically factory and construction workers resided there with most of them being originally from Tampere or the nearby areas such as Ostrobothnia. Pispala was a part of Pirkkala until 1922, when it was divided into Pohjois-Pirkkala and Etelä-Pirkkala. Pispala was a part of Pohjois-Pirkkala until it was transferred to Tampere in 1937. In the next year, Pohjois-Pirkkala was renamed to Nokia.

It is a periurban area or urban village and many of the features of the place echo this aspect.

== Neighbourhoods ==
=== Ylä-Pispala ===
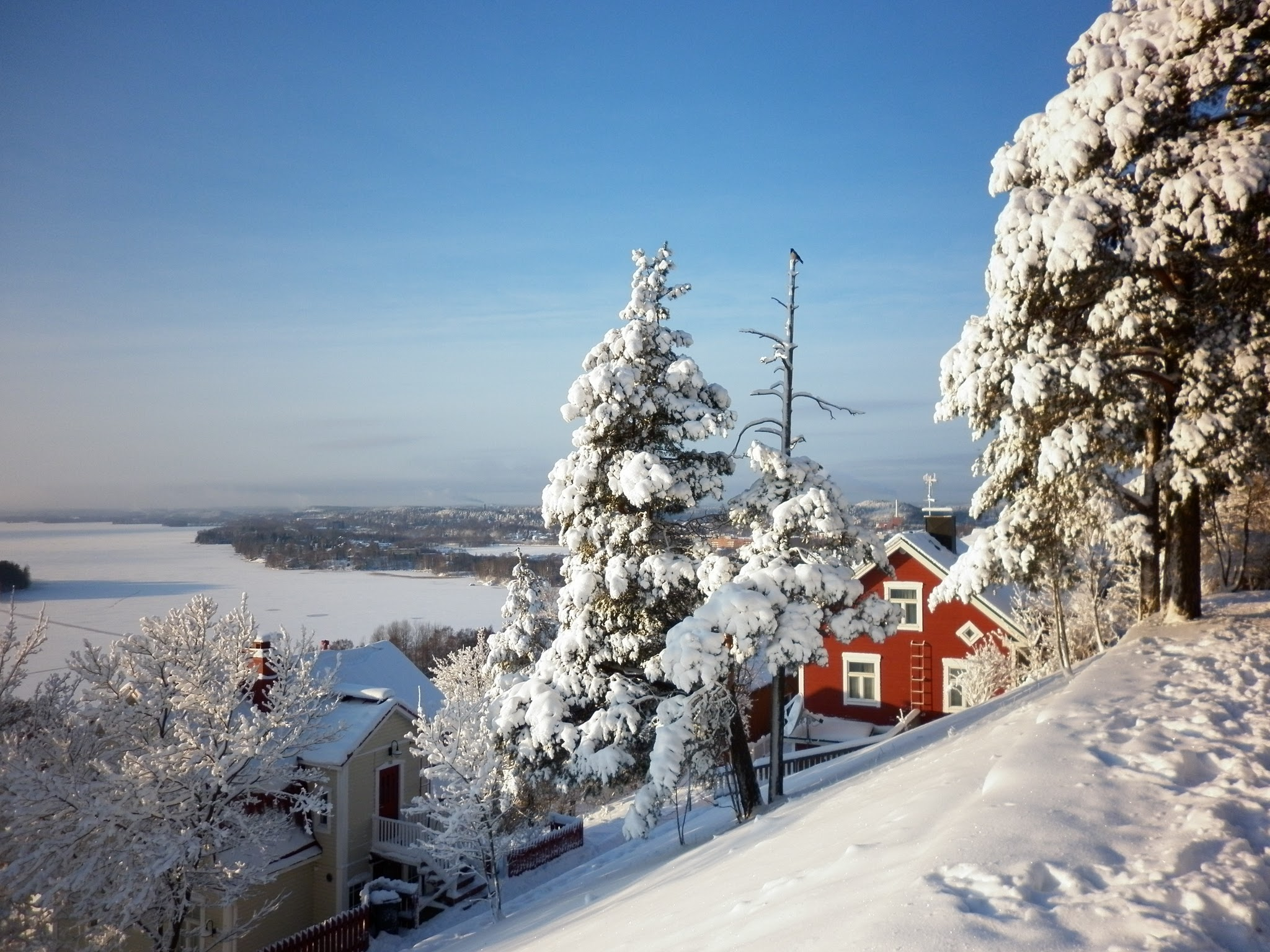
View from the esker in winter

Ylä-Pispala ("Upper Pispala") is bordered on the Tampere–Pori railway in the north, Pyynikki in the east, Tahmela in the south and Ala-Pispala in the west. There is the Pispala School in Ylä-Pispala, where the 1st-6th grades of primary school study. The school is located near the highest point of the ridge. The Pispalan Moreeni ry association, founded in 1969, also operates in Ylä-Pispala, which owns an old shotgun factory located next to Ahjola.

=== Ala-Pispala ===
Ala-Pispala ("Lower Pispala") borders the Tampere-Pori railway in the north, Ylä-Pispala in the east, Lake Pyhäjärvi in the south and Hyhky in the west. The Pispala Church, designed by architect Jaakko Ilveskoski and commissioned in 1971, is located in Ala-Pispala and is one of the three churches in the Harju Parish, which is part of the Tampere Parish Association.

== Culture of Pispala ==
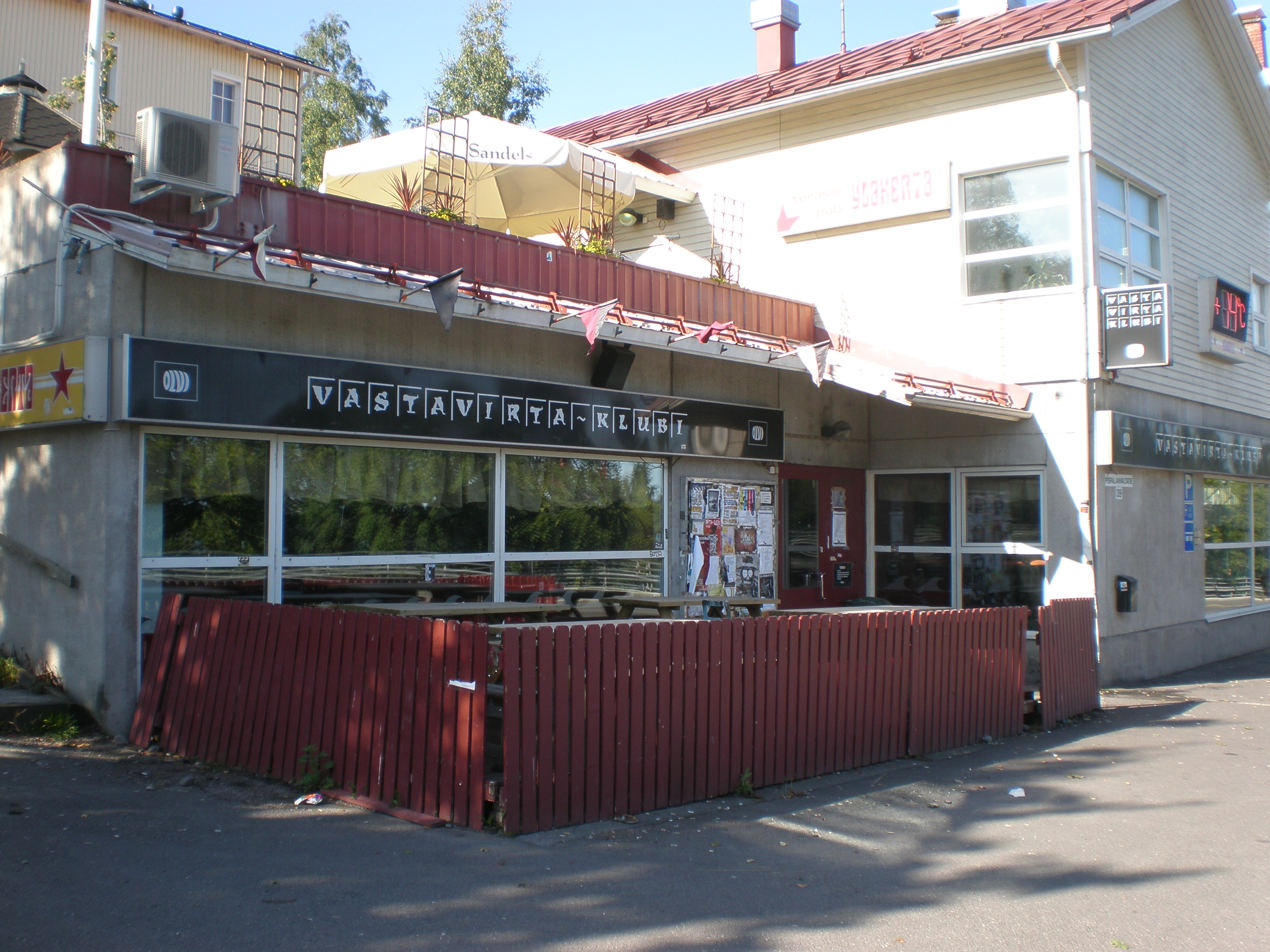
Vastavirta-Klubi, a rock club located in Ylä-Pispala

Many well-known Finnish artists and celebrities have lived and live in Pispala. These include Lauri Viita, Olavi Virta, Mikko Alatalo, Hannu Salama, Seela Sella, Keith Armstrong, Aaro Hellaakoski.

The only Finnish writer awarded with the Nobel Prize in Literature, F. E. Sillanpää located his novel Hiltu ja Ragnar (1923) − which the author considered his best work, in Pispala.

More recently it has featured as a main setting for the events in The Butterfly from Ural (Finnish: Uralin perhonen) animated short film directed by Katariina Lillqvist in 2008.

There are many small associations in the area and they are supported by an umbrella organization called the Pispalan kumppanuus.

Pispala houses the oldest still active public sauna in Finland. Rajaportin sauna began its operation in 1906 and is currently owned by the City of Tampere. However it is run by a local Pispala Sauna Association (Finnish: Pispalan saunayhdistys ry.).

Pispala currently houses the Pispala Centre of Contemporary Arts at Hirvitalo which organises various events both outdoors in various places around the suburb and within their gallery situated upon "moose street," Hirvikatu. It is run by the Pispala Cultural Association

Pispala Library is a community library locals founded in 2001 when the Tampere City Library closed its branch library in Pispala. It contains an anarchist bookshelf, computers and small gallery space and is involved in various community arts outreach projects.

Also found in Pispala is Kurpitsatalo ("Pumpkin House") a community gardening project that celebrates the cycle of the year with traditional pagan festivals, music and also has various allotments.

Today Pispala has a vibrant artivist atmosphere and has much in kin with other bohemian arts areas such as Užupis, Montmartre, Greenwich Village or Freetown Christiania.
