= Tahmela =

City district in Tampere, Finland

Coordinates: 61.49848486765829°N 23.71518635886689°E

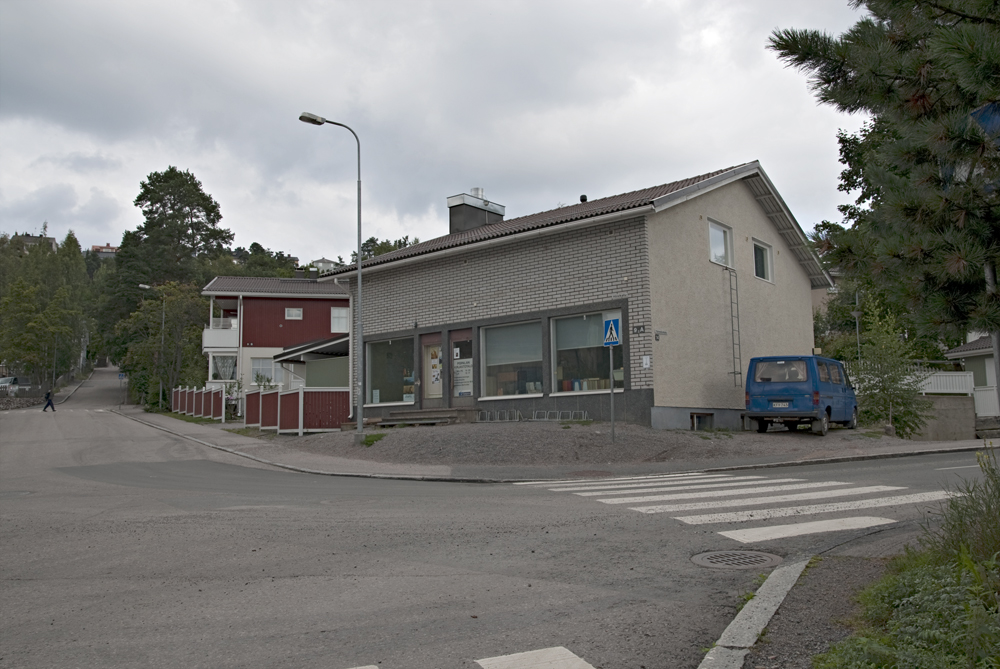
A corner of the Tahmelankatu and Hirvikatu streets in Tahmela

Tahmela is a district in Tampere, Finland. It is located between Ylä-Pispala and Pyynikki on the shores of Lake Pyhäjärvi. There is a Varala Sports College in Tahmela. There are rental agricultural plots on the shore of Tahmela, and Kurpitsaliike ry ("the Pumpkin Movement") was founded in 1998 to defend the continuation of land cultivation in Tahmela.

Tahmela has a large spring with very clear water until the 1960s, from which more than 600 households in the Pispala and Tahmela areas obtained their drinking water. The water was distributed by a cooperative that operated until 1961. In addition to the spring, the cultural center Hirvitalo is located in Tahmela.

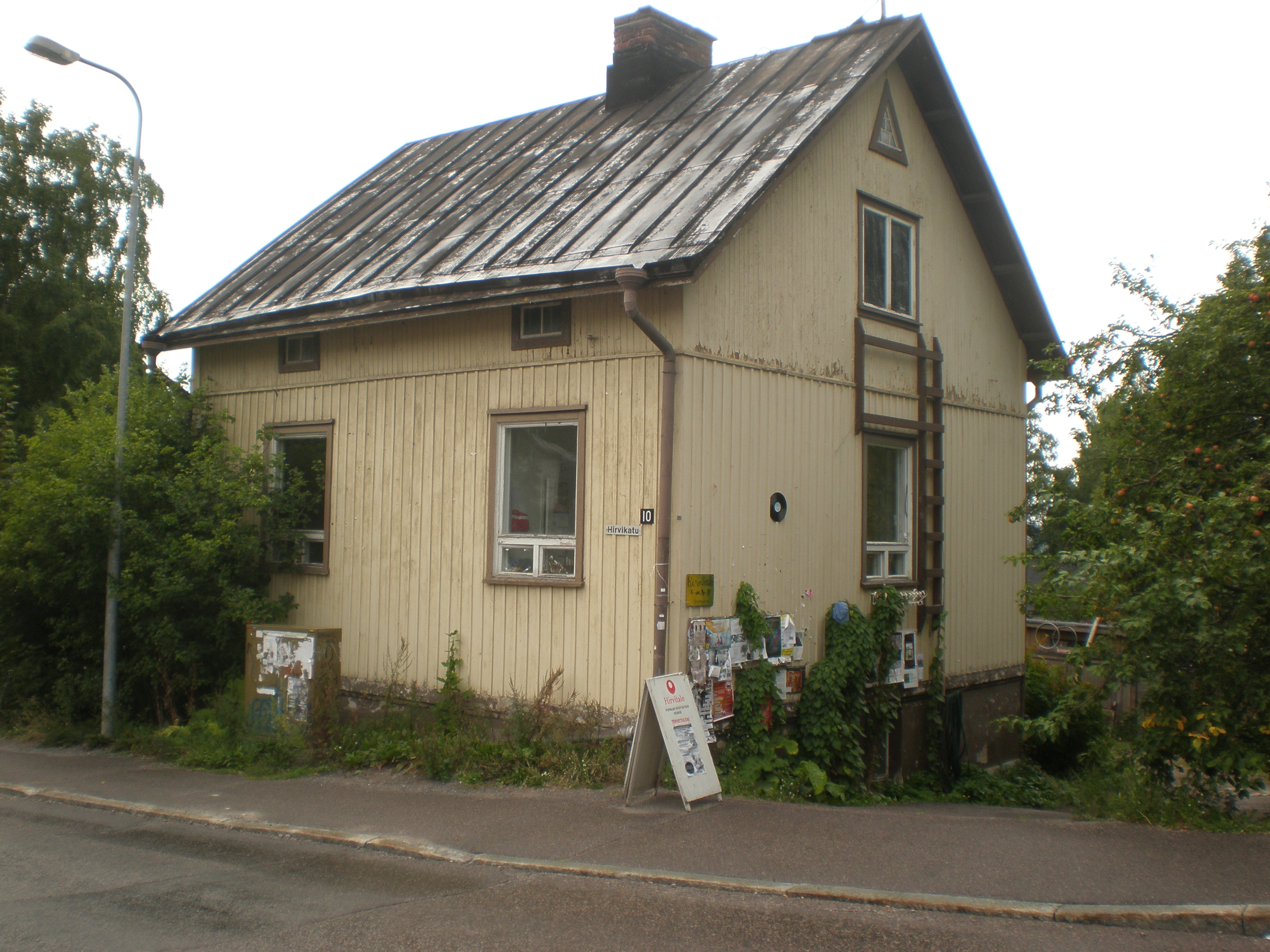
Hirvitalo in Tahmela

Tahmela is named after a croft of the same name located in the area, built around 1870. The croft was located along the current Selininkatu street. Tahmela was transferred from the municipality of Northern Pirkkala to the city of Tampere at the beginning of 1937. Until then, it had been part of the densely populated municipal community of Pispala. The town plan of Tahmela was confirmed in 1945 at the same time as the town plan of Pispala. The poet Yrjö Jylhä lived in Tahmela in his youth and according to him one of the streets of the district has been named. The former name of the Tahmela Bypass (Tahmelan viertotie) in 1945–1978 was Valtakunnantie and then until 1996 the Tahmela Highway (Tahmelan valtatie). The names refer, on the one hand, to a group of houses known as the "Kingdom of Vuorenmaa", and, on the other hand, that the street was to be built as a highway, like the Paasikiventie north of Pispala, under the Pyynikki Ridge's tunnel. Near Vallikatu are the remains of fortresses built by the Russian army during the First World War, which stretched from Tahmela to the Pispala Ridge. The name Hopankatu derives from a nearby ski jumping hill, built in 1908 and demolished in the late 1980s.
