= Residential area =

Land use in which housing predominates, as opposed to industrial and commercial areas

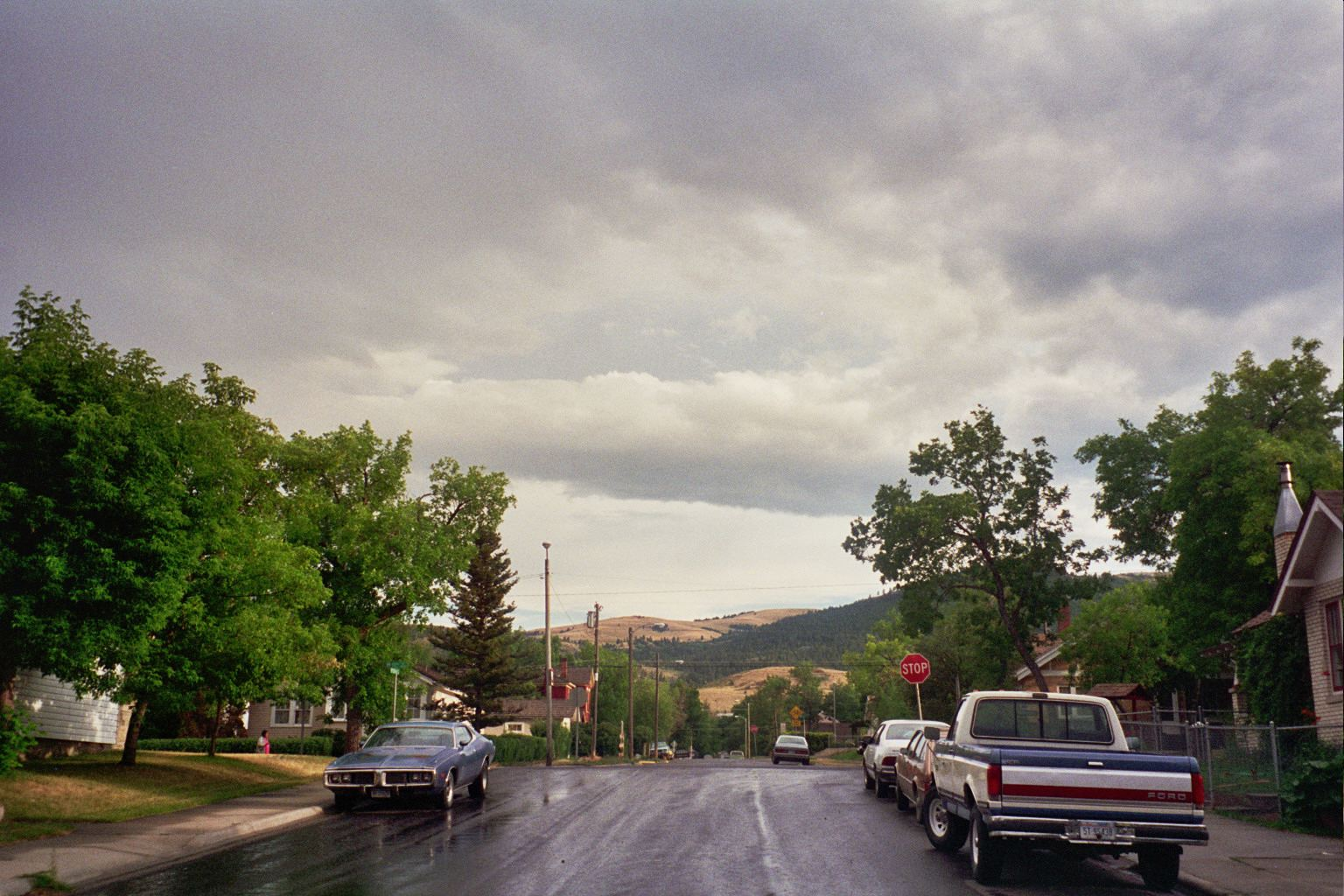
Residential area in Helena, Montana, United States

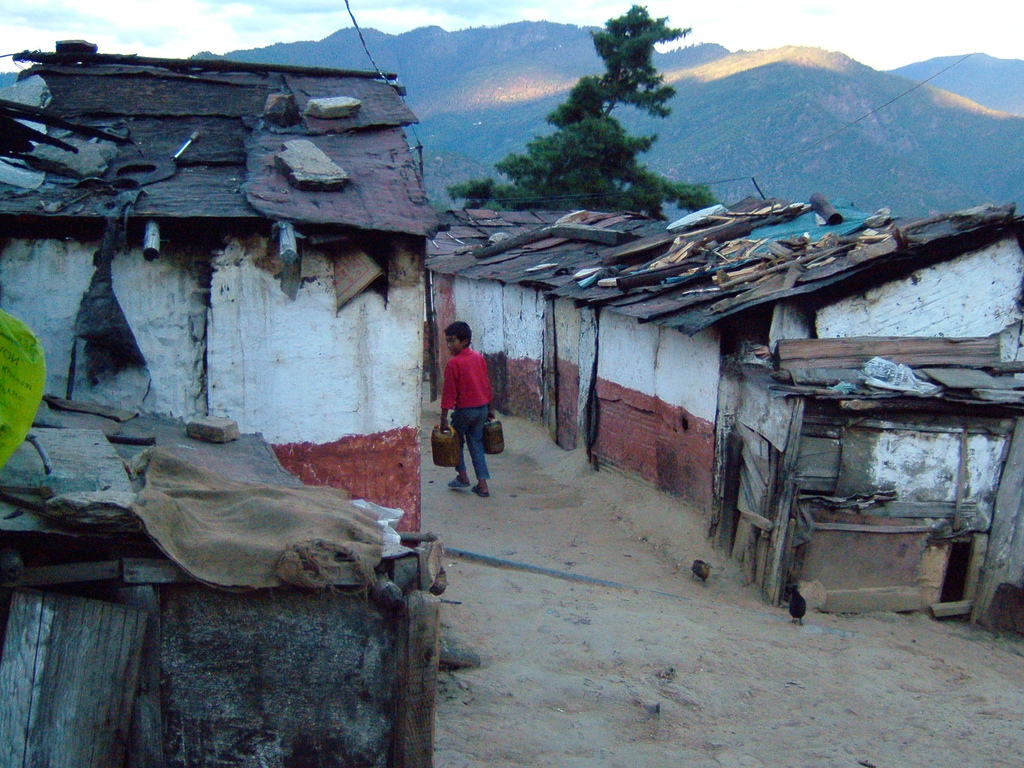
Suburban slum in Bhutan

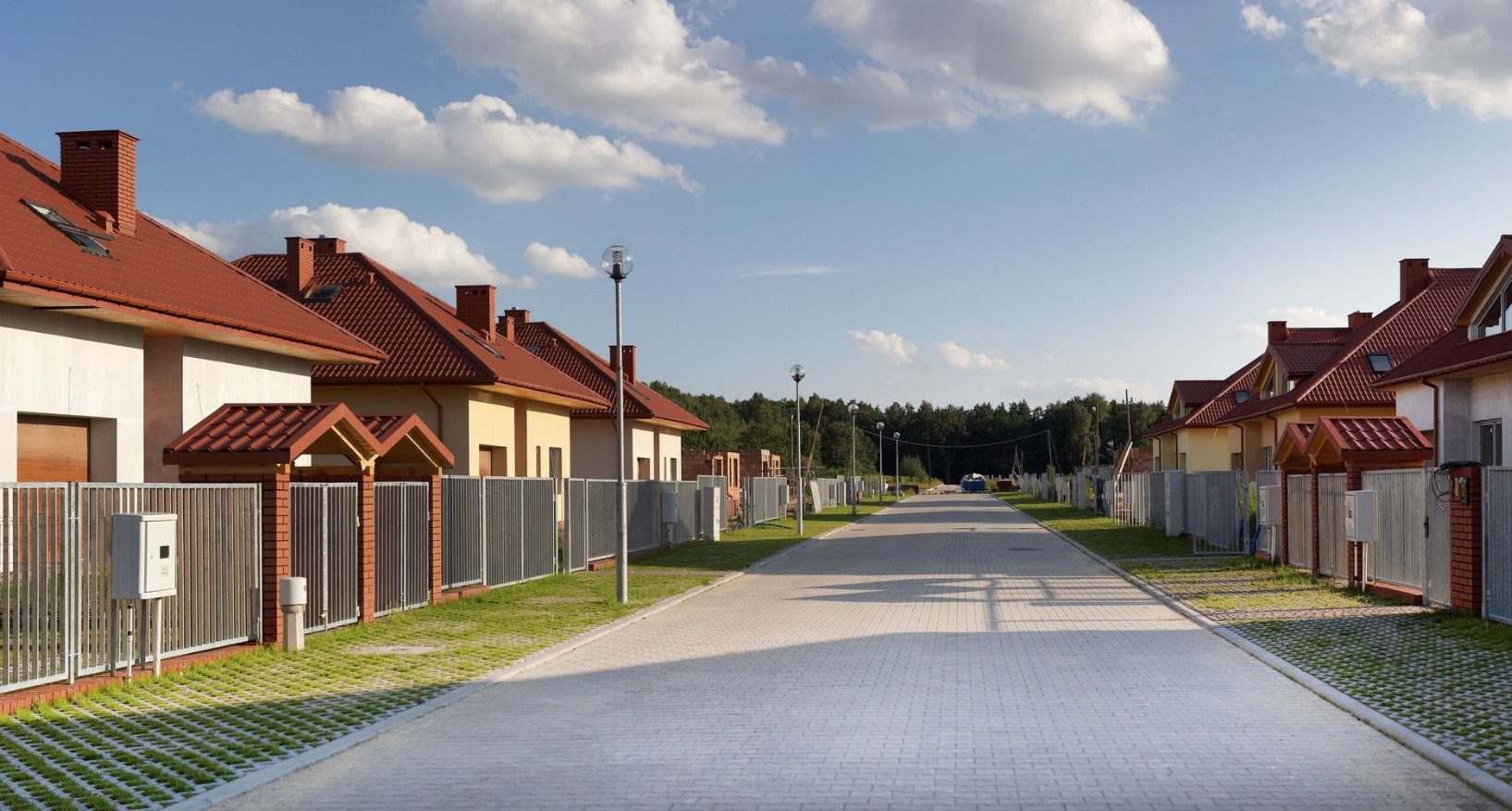
Residential area typical for suburbs in central Poland

A residential area is a land used in which housing predominates, as opposed to industrial and commercial areas.

Housing may vary significantly between, and through, residential areas. These include single-family housing, multi-family residential, or mobile homes. Zoning for residential use may permit some services or work opportunities or may totally exclude business and industry. It may permit high density land use or only permit low density uses. Residential zoning usually includes a smaller FAR (floor area ratio) than business, commercial or industrial/manufacturing zoning. The area may be large or small.

== Overview ==
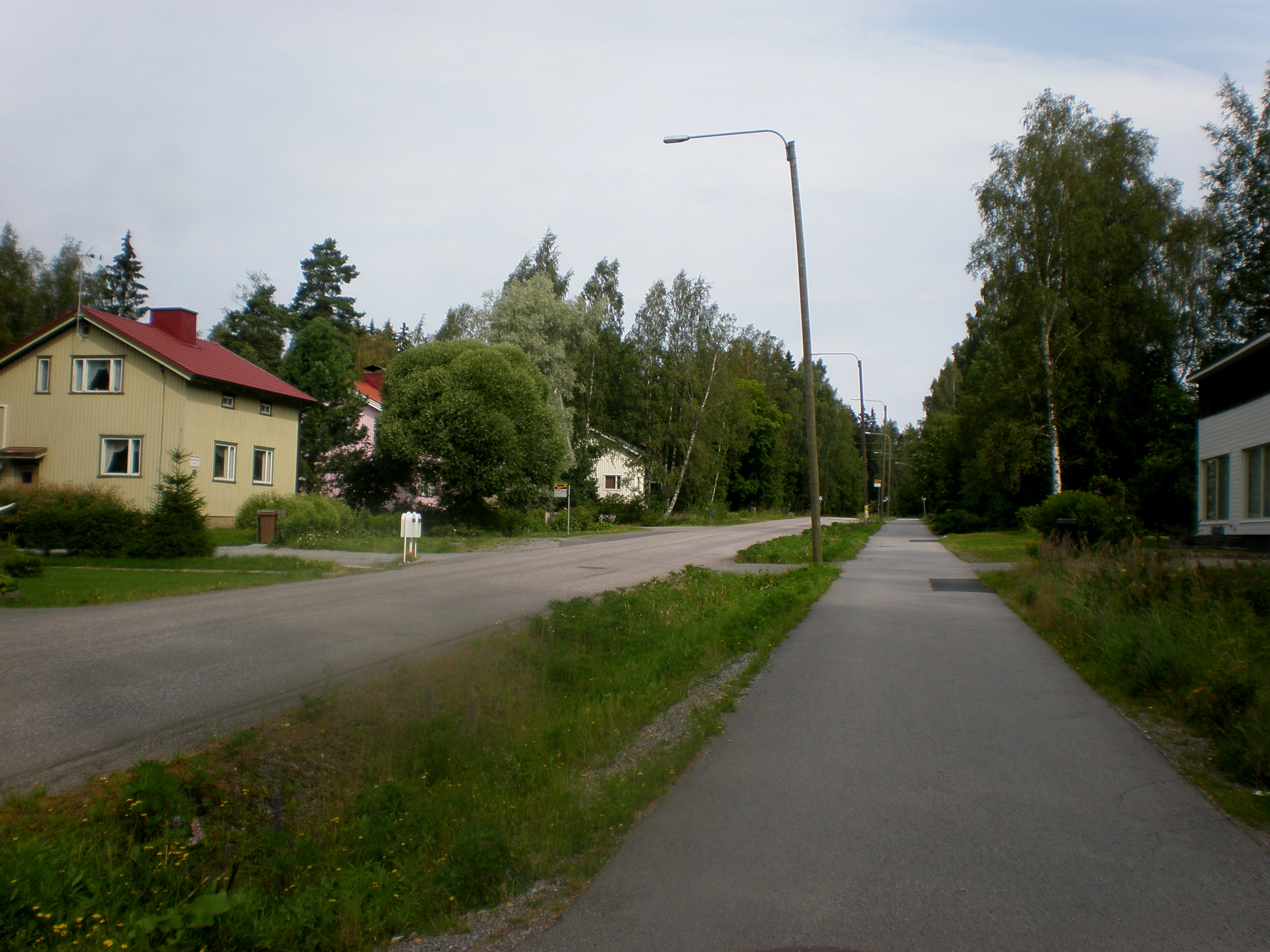
A residential area of Ikuri in Tampere, Finland

In certain residential areas, especially rural, large tracts of land may have no services whatever, such that residents seeking services must use a motor vehicle or other transportation, so the need for transportation has resulted in land development following existing or planned transport infrastructure such as rail and road. Development patterns may be regulated by restrictive covenants contained in the deeds to the properties in the development and may also result from or be reinforced by zoning. Restrictive covenants are not easily changed when the agreement of all property owners (many of whom may not live in the area) is required. The area so restricted may be large or small.

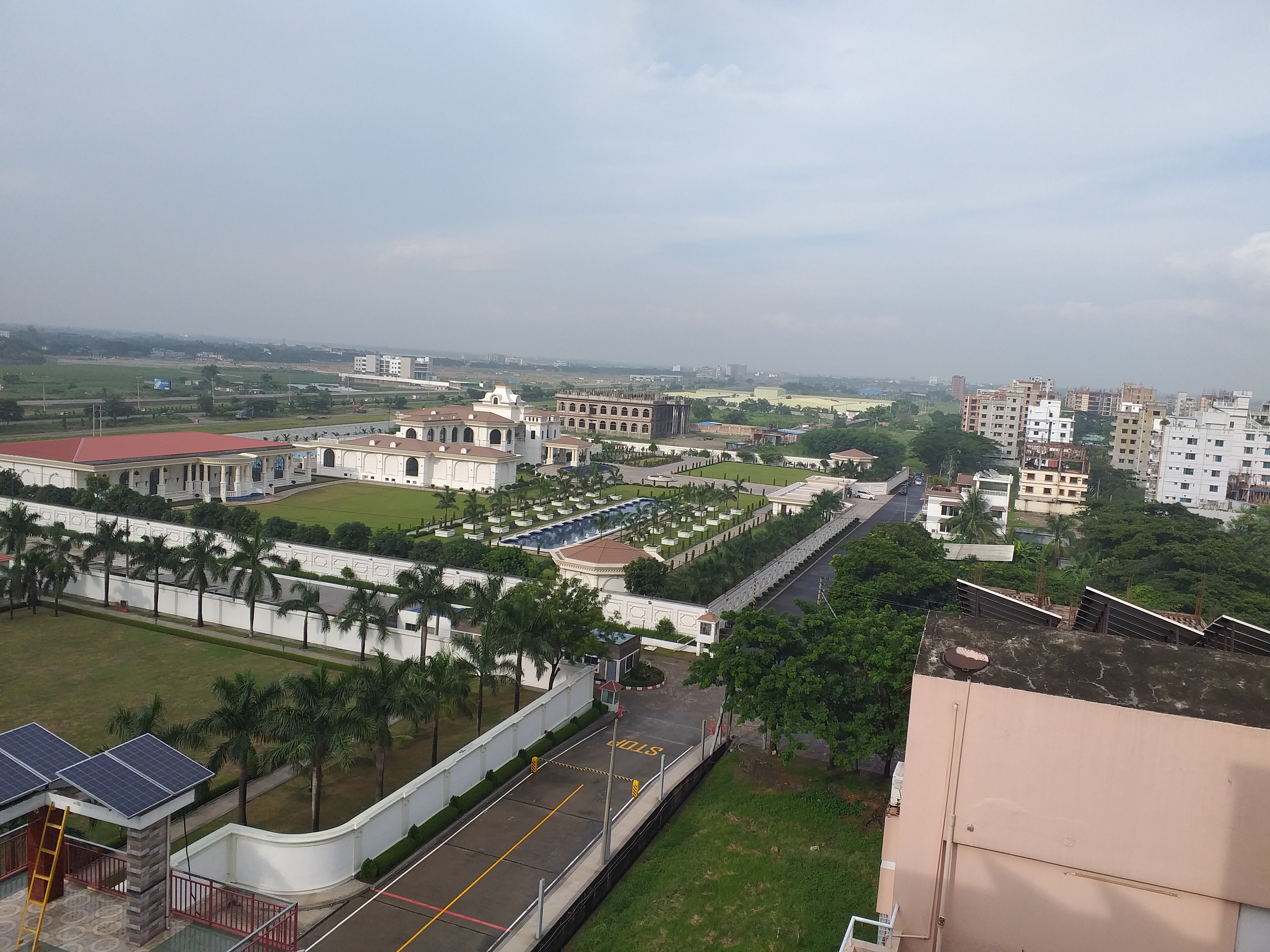
Bashundhara R/A, a private residential area in Dhaka

Residential areas may be subcategorized in the concentric zone model and other schemes of urban geography.

== Residential development ==
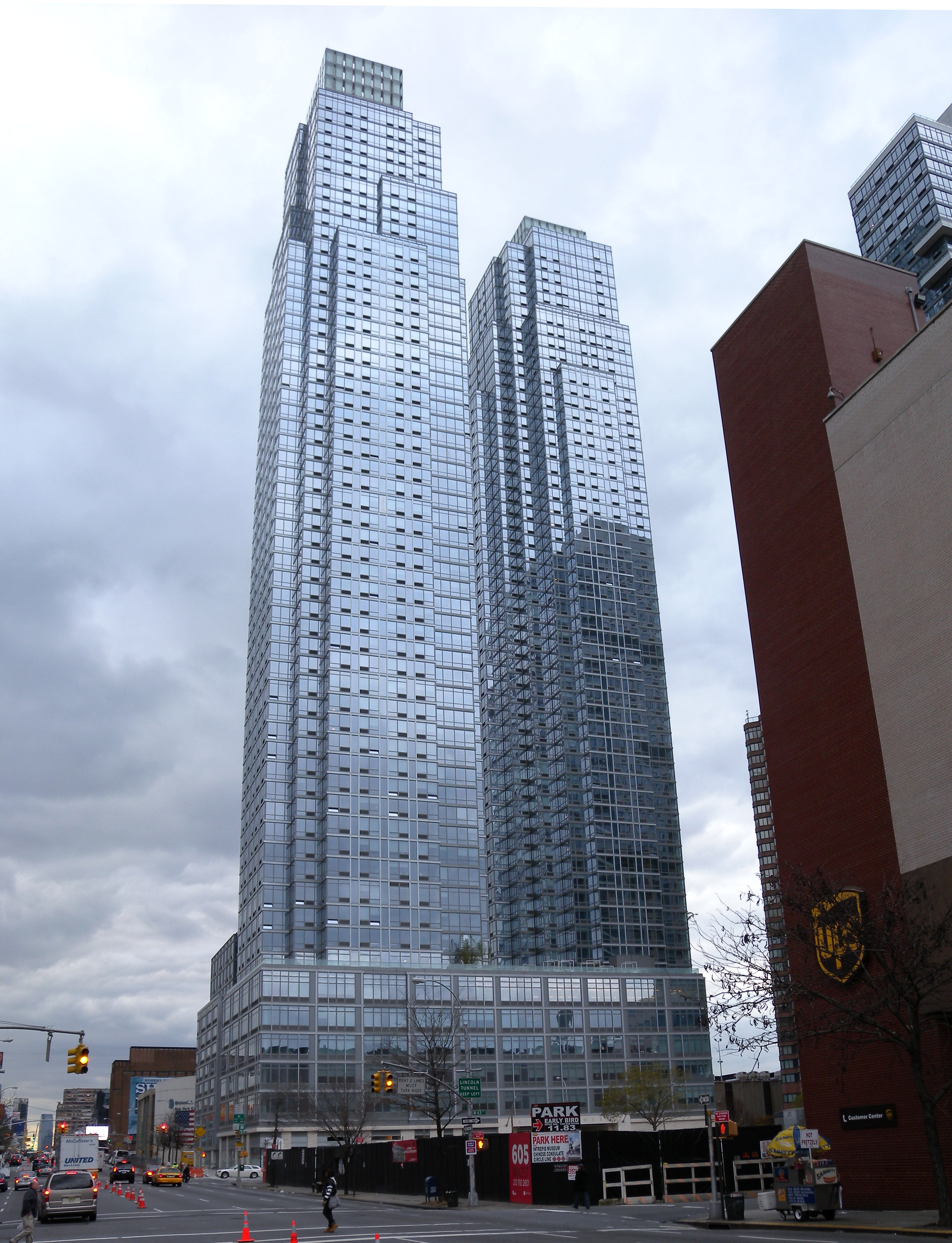
New inner city residences in Manhattan

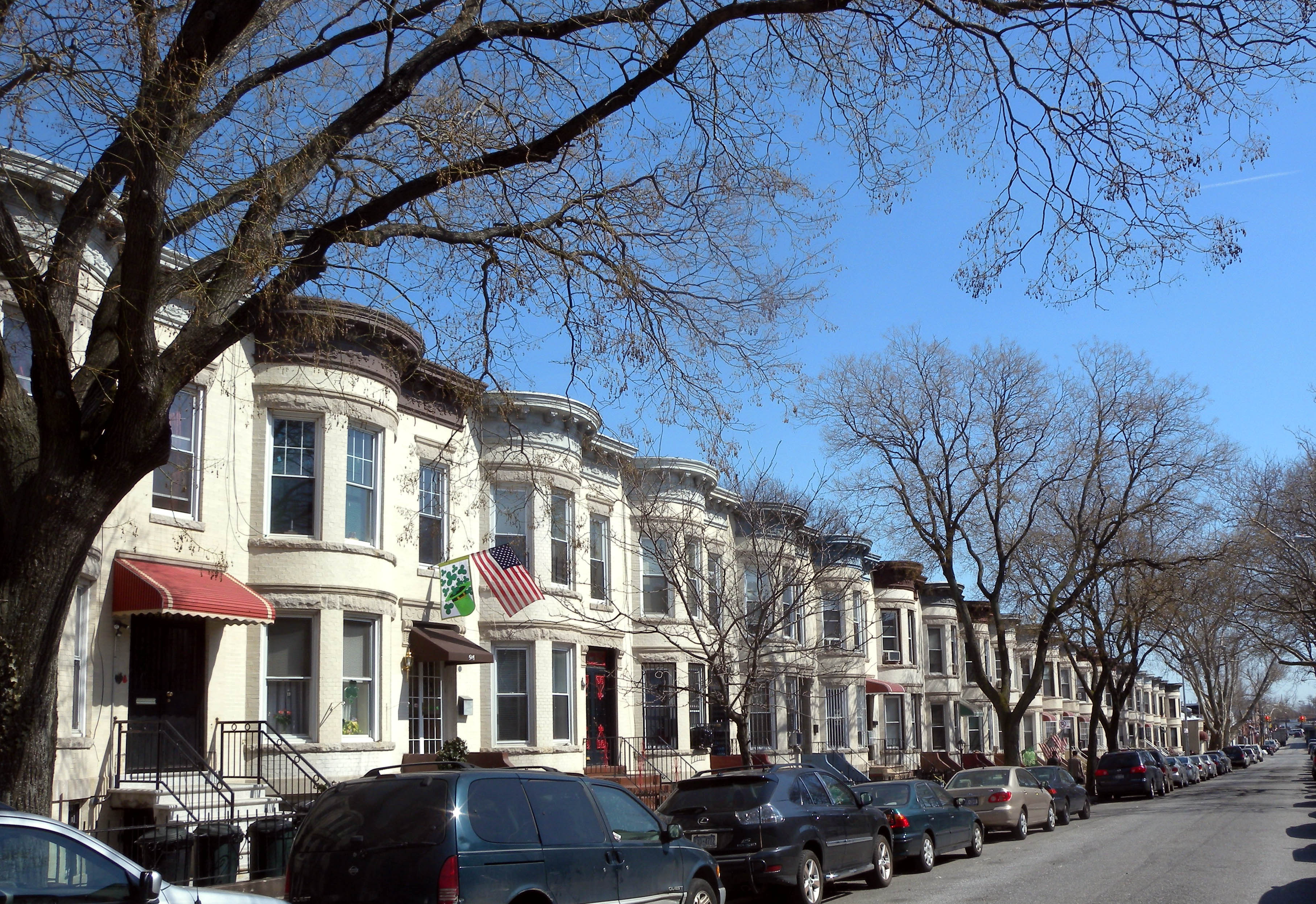
Residential area in Brooklyn about a century after it was developed

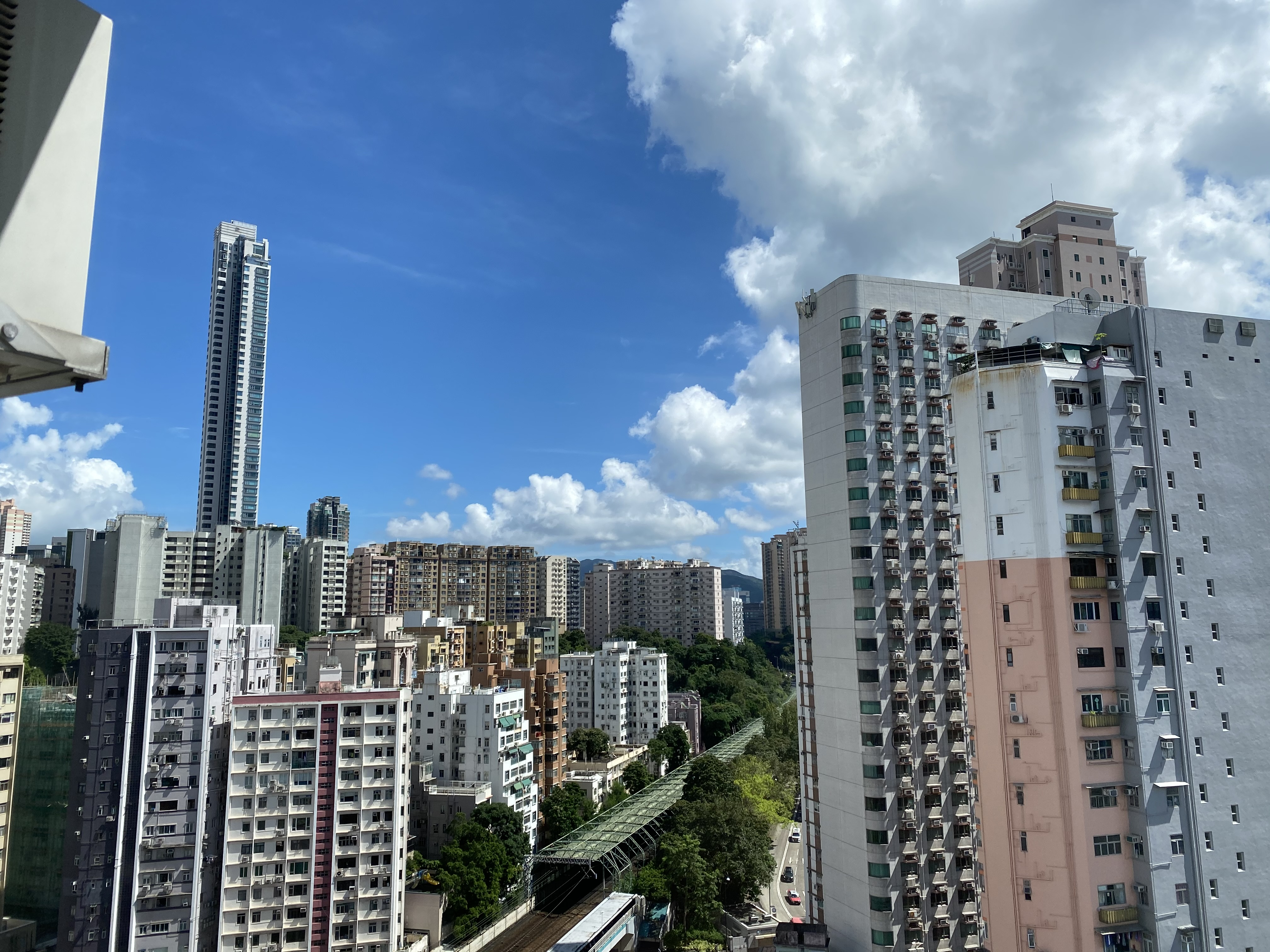
Residential area in Mong Kok East and Ho Man Tin, Hong Kong

=== History ===
Residential development is real estate development for residential purposes. Some such developments are called a subdivision, when the land is divided into lots with houses constructed on each lot. Such developments became common during the late nineteenth century, particularly in the form of streetcar suburbs.

In previous centuries, residential development was mainly of two kinds. Rich people bought a townlot, hired an architect and/or contractor, and built a bespoke / customized house or mansion for their family. Poor urban people lived in shantytowns or in tenements built for rental. Single-family houses were seldom built on speculation, that is for future sale to residents not yet identified. When cities and the middle class expanded greatly and mortgage loans became commonplace, a method that had been rare became commonplace to serve the expanding demand for home ownership.

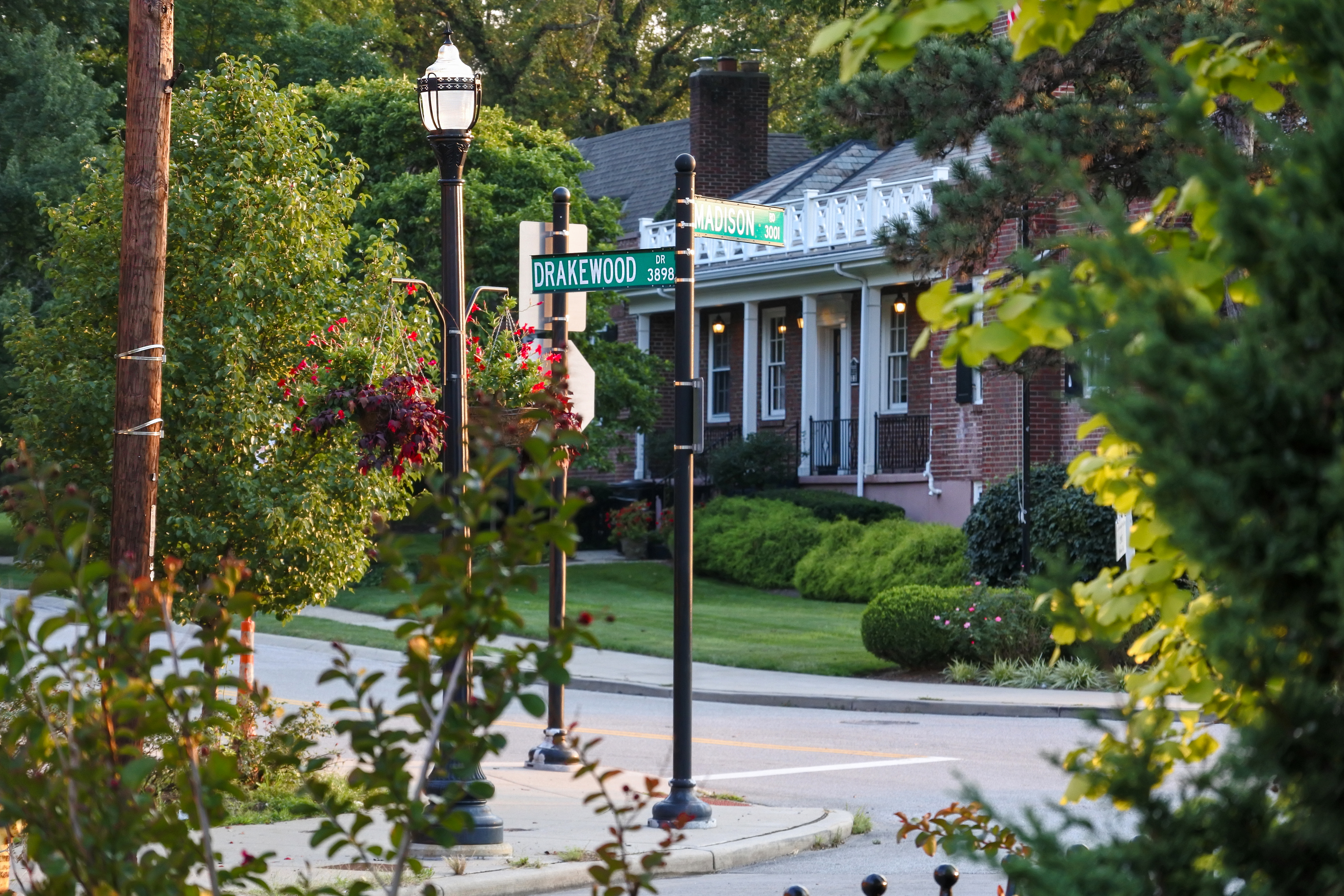
Residential street in Cincinnati, Ohio

Post–World War II economic expansion in major cities of the United States, especially New York City and Los Angeles produced a demand for thousands of new homes, which was largely met by speculative building. Its large-scale practitioners disliked the term "property speculator" and coined the new name "residential development" for their activity. Entire farms and ranches were subdivided and developed, often with one individual or company controlling all aspects of entitlement (permits), land development (streets and grading), infrastructure (utilities and sewage disposal), and housing. Communities like Levittown, Long Island or Lakewood south of Los Angeles saw new homes sold at unprecedented rates—more than one a day. Many techniques which had made the automobile affordable made housing affordable: standardization of design and small, repetitive assembly tasks, advertising, and a smooth flow of capital. Mass production resulted in a similar uniformity of product, and a more comfortable lifestyle than cramped apartments in the cities. With the advent of government-backed mortgages, it could actually be cheaper to own a house in a new residential development than to rent.

As with other products, continual refinements appeared. Curving streets, greenbelt parks, neighborhood pools, and community entry monumentation appeared. Diverse floor plans with differing room counts, and multiple elevations (different exterior "looks" for the same plan) appeared. Developers remained competitive with each other on everything, including location, community amenities, kitchen appliance packages, and price.

Today, a typical residential development in the United States might include traffic calming features such as a slowly winding street, dead-end road, or looped road lined with homes.

Suburban developments help form the stereotypical image of a "suburban America" and are generally associated with the American middle-class. Most offer homes in a narrow range of age, price, size and features, thus potential residents having different needs, wishes or resources must look elsewhere. Some residential developments are gated communities or residential communities.

=== Problems with residential developments ===
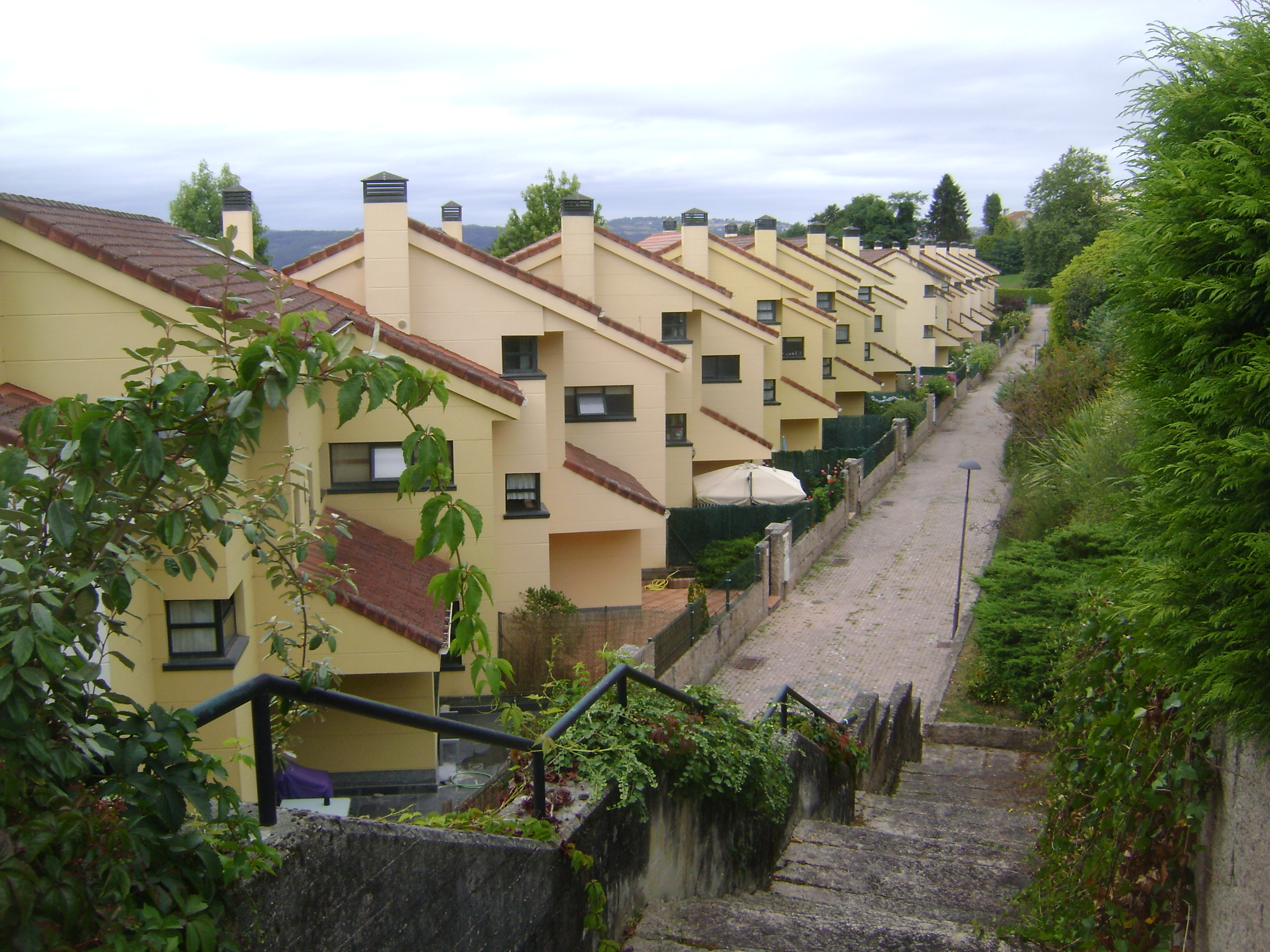
Residential area in Oleiros, Galicia, Spain.

Criticisms of residential developments may include the following:

- They do not mesh well with the greater community. Some are isolated, with only one entrance, or otherwise connected with the rest of the community in few ways.
- Being commuter towns, they serve no more purpose for the greater community than other specialized settlements do and thus require residents to go to the greater community for commercial or other purposes, whereas mixed-use developments provide for commerce and other activities, so residents need not go as often to the greater community.
- Lodging advancements can frequently be isolated with only one way in and one way out. Without great streets and ways to different regions, getting around can take a pointlessly lengthy timespan - making it harder for individuals to walk and cycle.
- Front nurseries with low walls will quite often be very much taken care of, with inhabitants keeping an eye on their front nurseries and covertly attempting to outperform their neighbors. Numerous designers lessen costs by eliminating these unobtrusive yet significant qualifications among public and confidential space. The outcome is many times puts that become unused, disliked and neglected.
- Current roads are packed with unattended vehicles, which is not just unattractive but blocks pavements, makes roads more unsafe for kids and is also often the source of arguments with neighbours.
- Everybody cherishes a tree-lined road, however new improvements frequently overlook them. Numerous expressways specialists deter trees and hedgerows making green and verdant roads progressively difficult to come by. As an outcome, many modern developments are dominated by hard materials and often appear colorless.
