= The Butterfly from Ural =

- Directed by: Katariina Lillqvist
- Written by: Katariina Lillqvist, Hannu Salama
- Produced by: Jyrki Kaipainen
- Starring: Jotaarkka Pennanen, Aliisa Pulkkinen
- Release date: 2008
- Running time: 27 minutes
- Language: Finnish

The Butterfly from Ural or Far Away from Ural (Finnish: Uralin perhonen) is a Finnish 2008 animated short film directed by Katariina Lillqvist.

== Plot ==
The film tells the story of former President of Finland Gustaf Mannerheim – although his name is not mentioned in the film – on a journey to Central Asia where he meets a young Kyrgyz boy. Mannerheim takes the boy with him back to Finland where he names him Butterfly. The boy becomes Mannerheim's servant and lover. When the Finnish Civil War starts, Mannerheim abandons his lover in the middle of the battlefield. According to the director Lillqvist, the film is based on a folklore from the Pispala district of Tampere.

The film caused a fuss in the Finnish media and evoked discussion about the limits of the freedom of speech and the sexual orientation of Mannerheim. It was nominated the best domestic animation at the Tampere Film Festival in March 2008, and was broadcast by YLE the same month.
