= Lauri Viita =

Finnish poet (1916–1965)

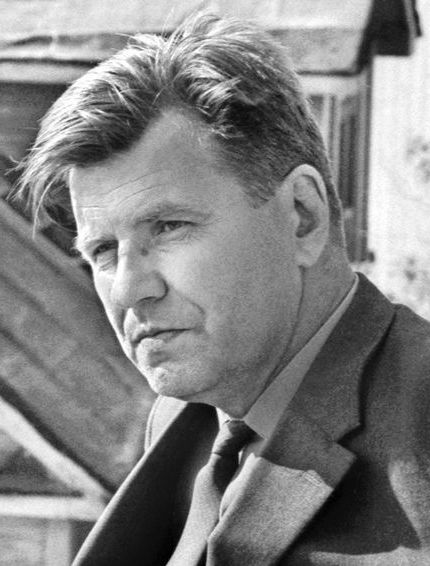
- Born: 17 December 1916; Pirkkala, Finland
- Died: 22 December 1965 (aged 49); Helsinki, Finland

Lauri Arvi Viita (17 December 1916 – 22 December 1965) was a poet hailing from the Pispala district of Tampere, Finland.

Viita was a verbally talented son of a carpenter who became a self-taught writer. He only published four poetry collections, but they became very popular. He also inspired other writers who had a working-class background. Viita's last creative years were shadowed by a mental illness, and he spent several periods in hospital.

Viita wrote mainly traditional poetry with rhymes. In the 1950s, he was shadowed by emerging modernists such as Paavo Haavikko and Tuomas Anhava. He played with words and published, e.g. a poem where all words started with the letter K.

Viita was married three times and had seven children. His second wife was the famous poet Aila Meriluoto. Viita died in a car accident in December 1965, when the taxi he was in was struck by a truck driven by a drunk driver.

== Selected works ==
- Betonimylläri (poems, 1947)
- Kukunor (a poetic fairytale, 1949)
- Moreeni (a novel, 1950)
- Käppyräinen (poems, 1954)
- Suutarikin, suuri viisas (poems, 1961)
- Entäs sitten, Leevi (a novel, 1965)
