= Hirvitalo =

Community centre in Tampere, Finland

Coordinates: 61°29′58″N 23°42′51″E

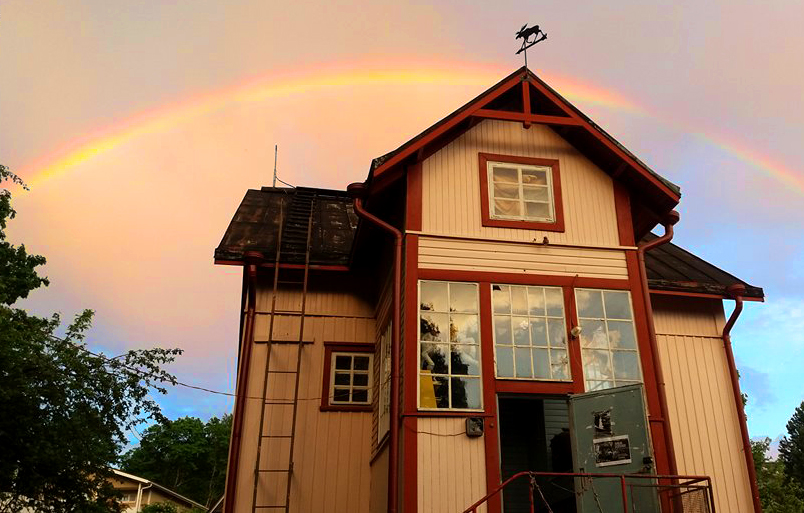
Hirvitalo

Hirvitalo (lit. 'Moose House') is a social center in the Pispala's Tahmela district of Tampere, Finland. It houses the Center of Contemporary Art Pispala.

== What is there? ==
In Hirvitalo there are 3 gallery rooms, recording studio, a seriegraphy space and a shop. In the outbuildings there is a bicycle repairing space run by Pispala Pyörä Punx (Pispala Bike Punks).

== Foundation ==
Hirvitalo is run by Pispala's Cultural Association, which was founded in 2006. Its main aim is to invigorate the cultural life in Tampere and Pispala by offering free space for contemporary artists, and for the local people to organize happenings.

== Activities ==
Most visible activities are contemporary art exhibitions. Throughout the year also various events are organized. They have included poetry festivals, video screenings, study circles, performance art festivals, flamenco and drumming groups.

Hirvitalo has hosted many foreign artists' workshops and exhibitions.

The Pispala Cultural Association also participates in activities away from the actual building, such as eco-art installations, exhibitions, performances and other cultural happenings.

There are some nearby grounds of the house in which the Pispala Carnival happens and permaculture courses as well as outside events.

The house also helps with social inclusion agenda hosting meetings and employing artists and others in integration and training programs. This includes the Pispalan kumppanuus ry with 10 other associations, and the European Voluntary Service.

== Awards ==
- In 2012, TAMY (the student union of Tampere university) granted Hirvikatu the Vappulakki Award.
- In 2014, Hirvitalo won the Vuoden taideteko (Art project of the year) award, worth €3,000.
