= Ikuri =

City district in Tampere, Finland

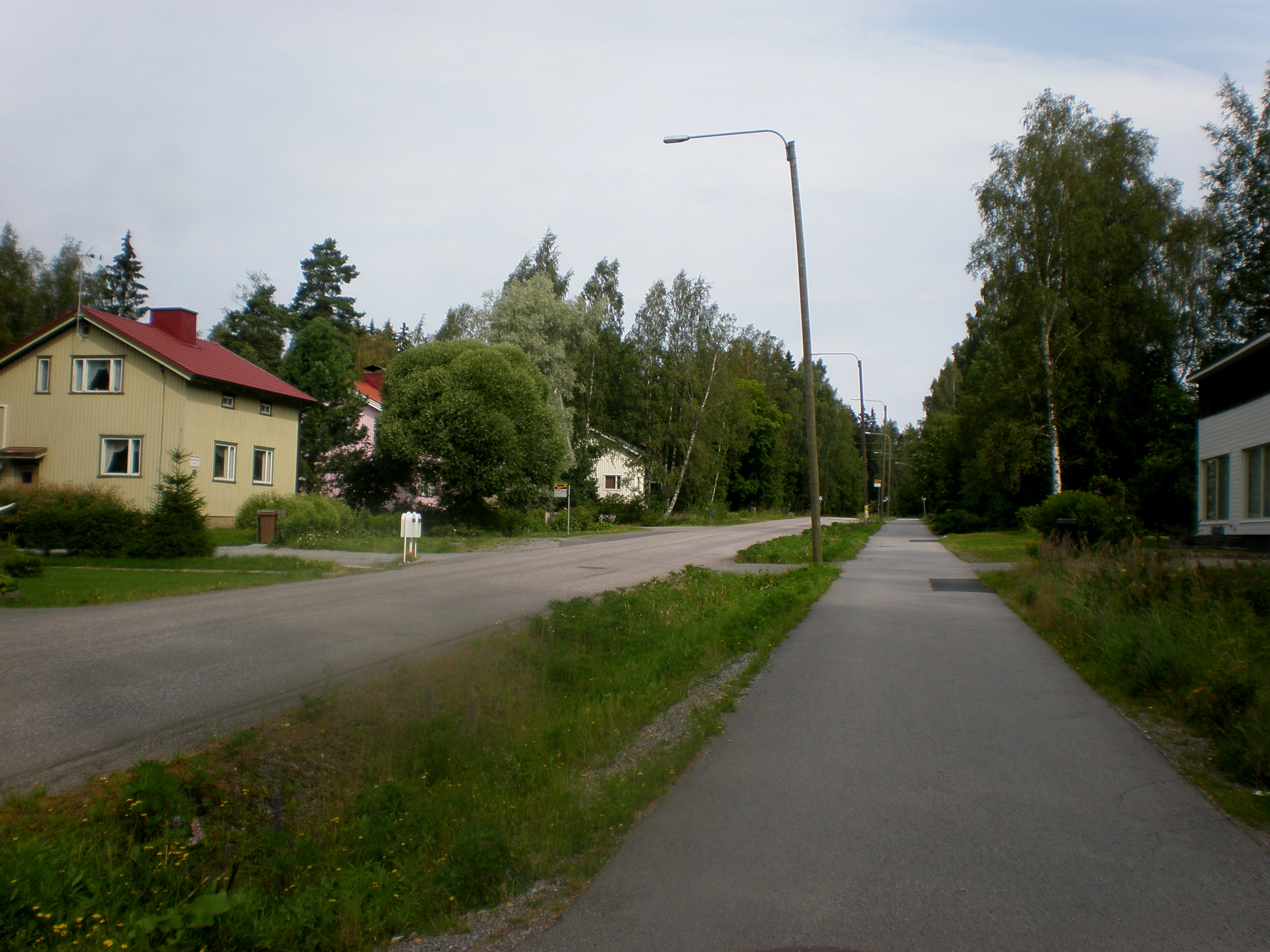
Suburb of Ikuri

Ikuri is one of the westernmost districts of Tampere, Finland, near the border of Nokia. The streets in the district have been named in a rural fashion, such as Maamiehentie ("Farmer Street"), Heinämiehentie ("Hay Cutter Street") and Marjamiehentie ("Berry Picker Street"). The forests in the Myllypuro nature preservation area stretching from Ikuri to Kalkku have been classified as an ecologically important Natura 2000 site. The famous Finnish rock band Popeda is from Ikuri. The name Ikuri first appeared in a tax listing in the 16th century. The Ikuri farm was farmed by Niilo Ijkuri, and by Simo Ikuri after him. In the early 17th century, the farm was unified with the Mattila farm in Hyhky. The district was named Ikuri in a zoning plan accepted in 1948. The zoning plan in Ikuri has been formed as quite sparse and uniform with the terrain. One reason for this seems to be that the worst rocky areas were not zoned for use as lots, but were left in their natural state. The district, intended mostly for residence by war veterans and immigrants from Finnish Karelia, mostly consisted of the lands of the Kaarila mansion in Epilä. Building of houses started very soon in the area, in fact so soon that before 1950, the district had 31 inhabitants even though the streets, the electricity and the sewage plumbing were still under construction. Old cart roads crossing the area were used as transport pathways, leading to the rocky forests and swampy fields of Ikuri from Lamminpää, Rahola and Villilä. As well as lots of roughly 10 acres, 31 residential farm fields of a couple of hectares each were founded in Ikuri. Bus transport to Ikuri started by request from the newly founded residential association by an extra peak-time bus from Lamminpää in 1951, at first twice per day to the Haukiluomantie-Maamiehentie crossing, and afterwards, as the road construction progressed, to the Maamiehentie-Kuokkijantie crossing. The bus route number 10 reached to the Ikurintie-Tuohikorventie crossing in summer 1953, which became the terminus of the route for years. According to Jarmo Peltola's book Onnikoita ja rollikoita, the bustraffic to Ikuri and to the neighbouring district of Kalkku was real social municipal transport, as Ikuri had a population of 1257 in the 1960s, with two buses and a distance of 13 km from the Tampere Central Square.

Ikuri has a kindergarten and a school for grades 1 to 4, which was renovated in the middle 2000s. The school is now a place of function of the Tesomajärvi school. Ikurin Virelä was built in the 1950s and is still often in use in several events and celebrations.

The district also houses Ikuri Arcade, which specializes in pinball machines and arcade games.
