= Ristimäki =

City district in Tampere, Finland

Coordinates: 61.5051°N 23.6378°E

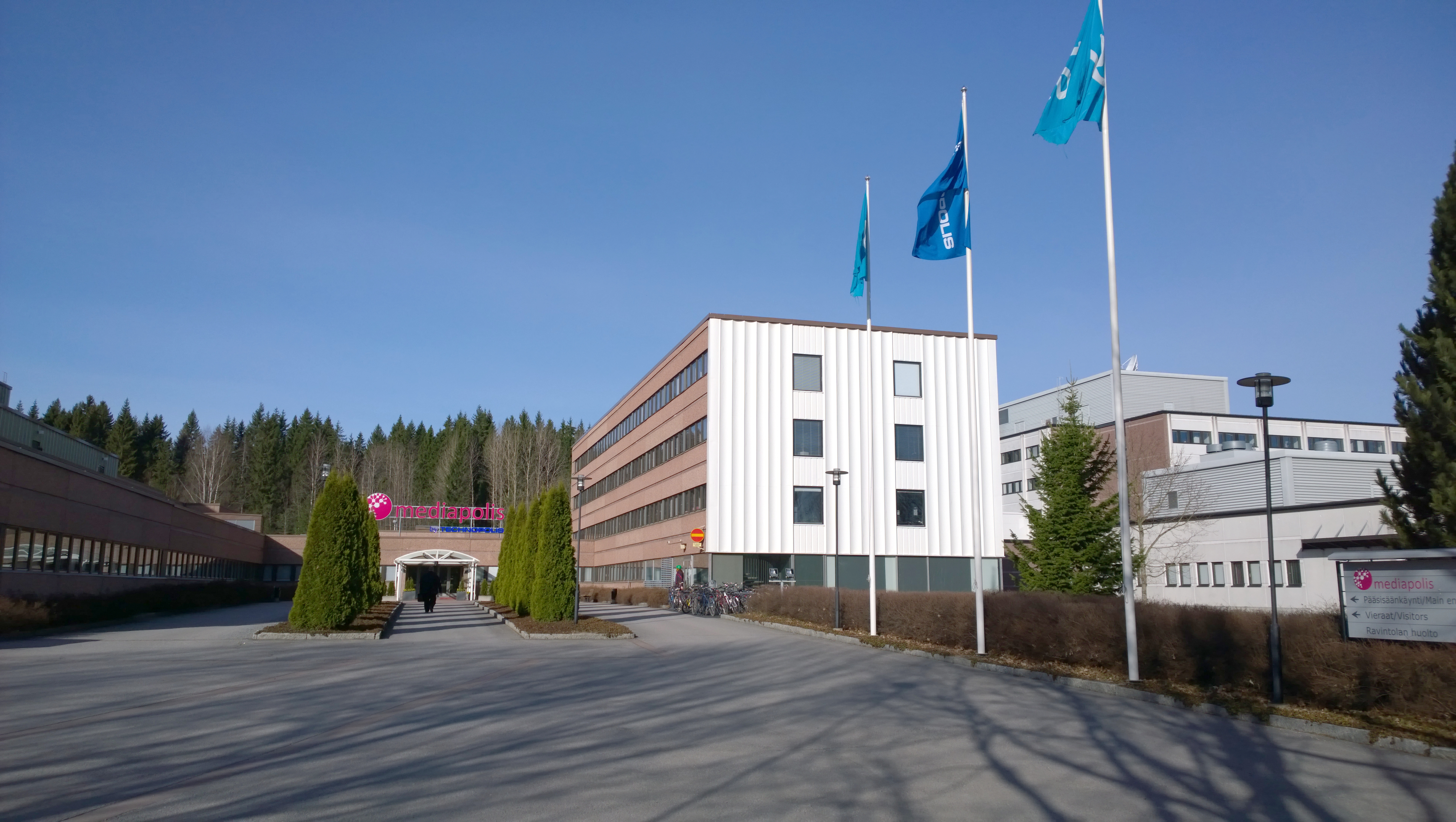
Mediapolis, a home studio to the television channel Yle TV2

Ristimäki is a neighbourhood in the city of Tampere, Finland. It is bordered on the north by Tohloppi, on the east by Epilänharju, on the west by Tesomajärvi and on the south by the Tampere-Pori railway. Mediapolis, YLE's office, and Tesoma School are located in the district.
