= Hyhky =

City district in Tampere, Finland

Coordinates: 61.50537046422496°N 23.690691194894224°E

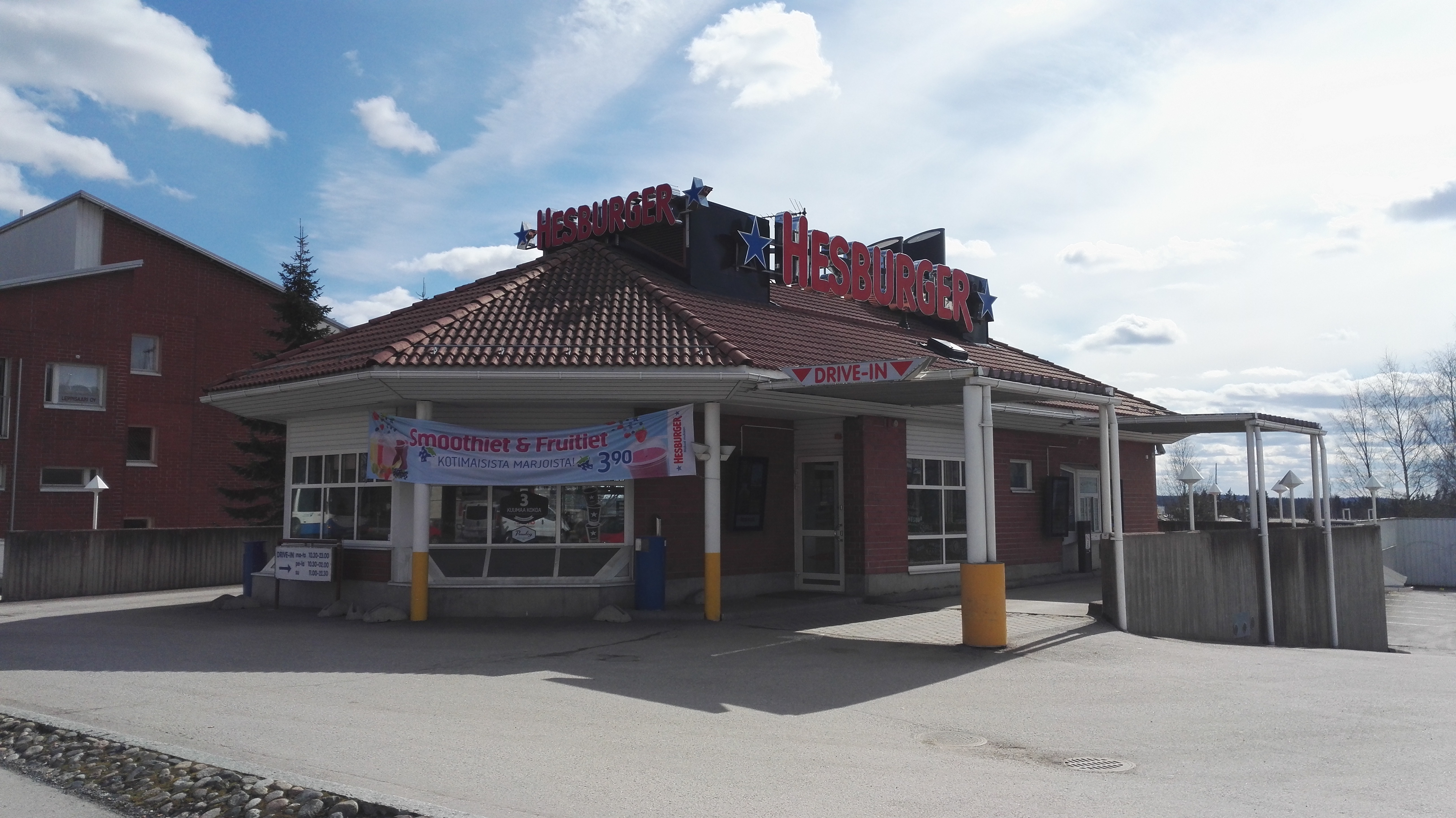
Hesburger in Hyhky

Hyhky (Swedish: Hycky or Hyhkö) is a district in the northwestern part of Tampere, Finland. It is bordered on the north by Lielahti, on the east by Ala-Pispala, on the south by Kaarila and on the west by Epilä.

The village of Hyhky, which originally belonged to Pirkkala, was mentioned in documents as early as 1433. The first mention of Pispala dates back to 1492, when the boundary of the premises of Mikko Pispala and Niilo Huovari was checked. In fact, Pispala is named after Pispa's farm in Hyhky. In the Middle Ages, Hyhky was often a court seat, and at least in 1507, 1509, and 1514 lawspeaker courts were held there. According to the 1540 land register, Hyhky had seven farms. The origin of the name Hyhky is unknown, but the same roots are possibly Hykky in Pälkäne and Hykkö in Tyrvää.

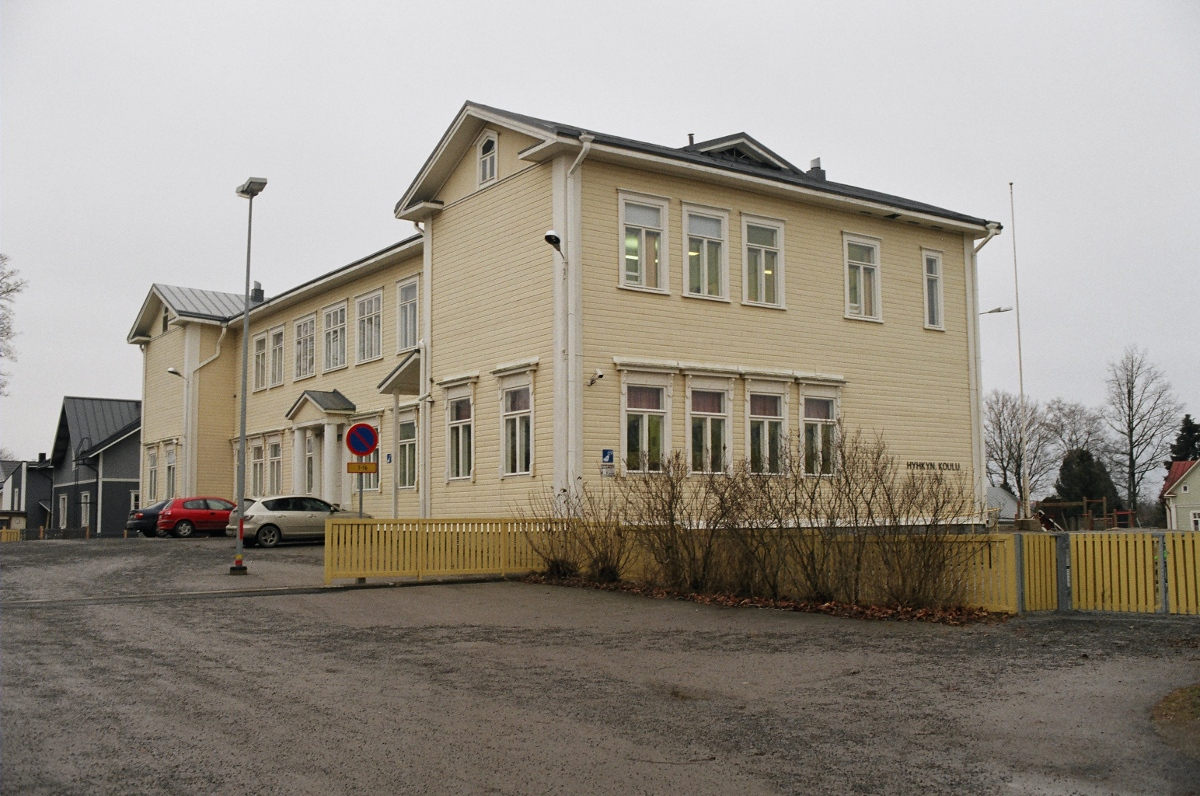
Hyhky school

Hyhky was transferred from the then Northern Pirkkala to the city of Tampere at the beginning of 1937. The joint town plan of the Hyhky, Kaarila and Epilä districts was confirmed in 1953. The oldest building in Hyhky is known to be the old court house where the Henneri's playground currently operates. Henneri is an old house in the village of Hyhky and the name is probably based on the personal name Henrik. Hyhky also has a primary school.

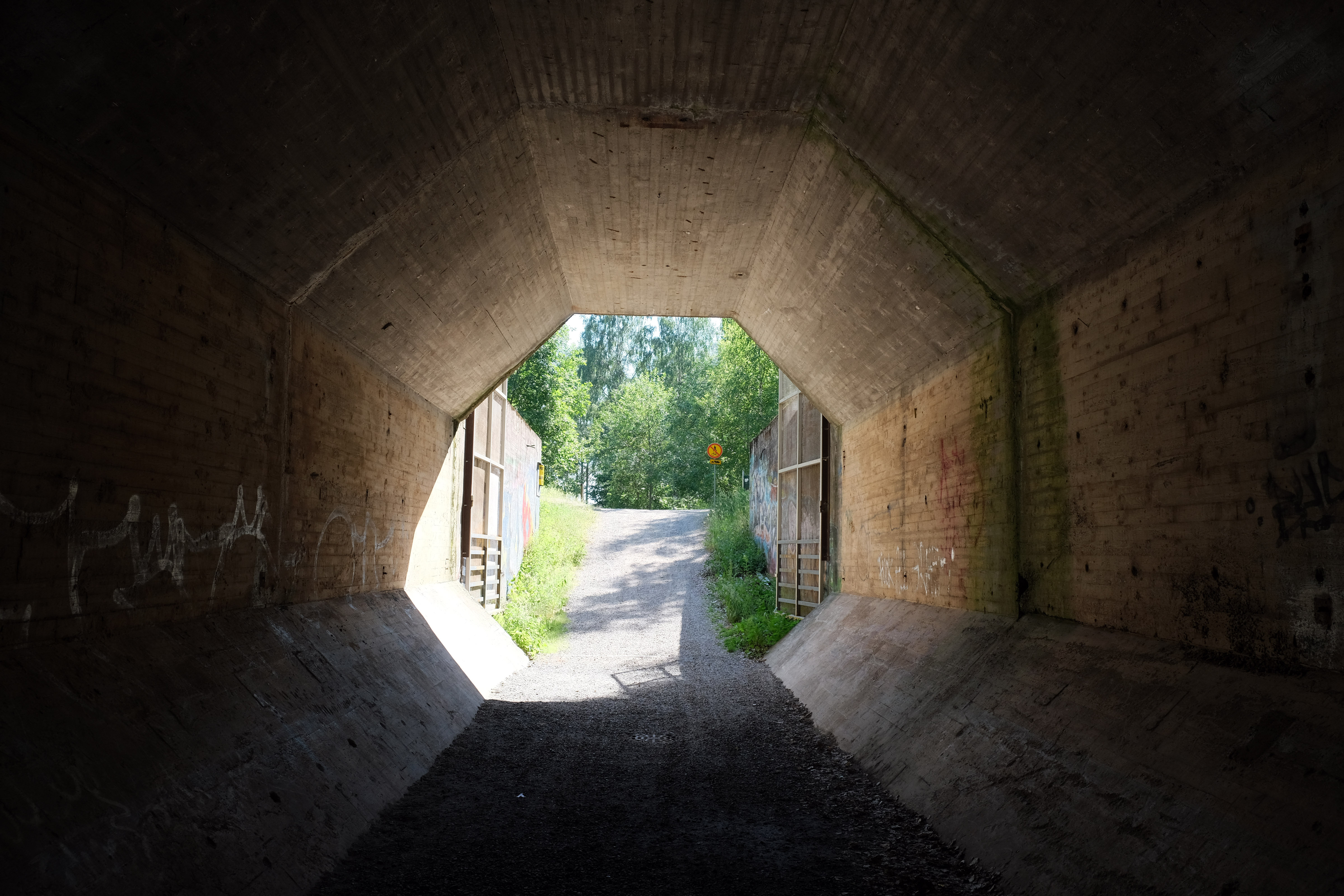
Pispala's former log driving tunnel from the Lake Pyhäjärvi side in 2020

The Pispala timber rafting tunnel, built in the 1930s for log driving in the Kokemäki River, is located in Hyhky. The tunnel was preceded by two roller tracks (“red” and “gray” block road) located on the upper ridge. The new floating tunnel built next to the old floating tunnel was completed in 1968, but it was immediately redundant when the Kokemäki River's log driving ended at the end of the same year. In June 2013, the floating tunnel was opened for boat and pedestrian traffic as a connection between Lake Näsijärvi and Lake Pyhäjärvi.
