= Epilänharju =

City district in Tampere, Finland

Coordinates: 61°30′46.94335″N 23°39′42.49472″E

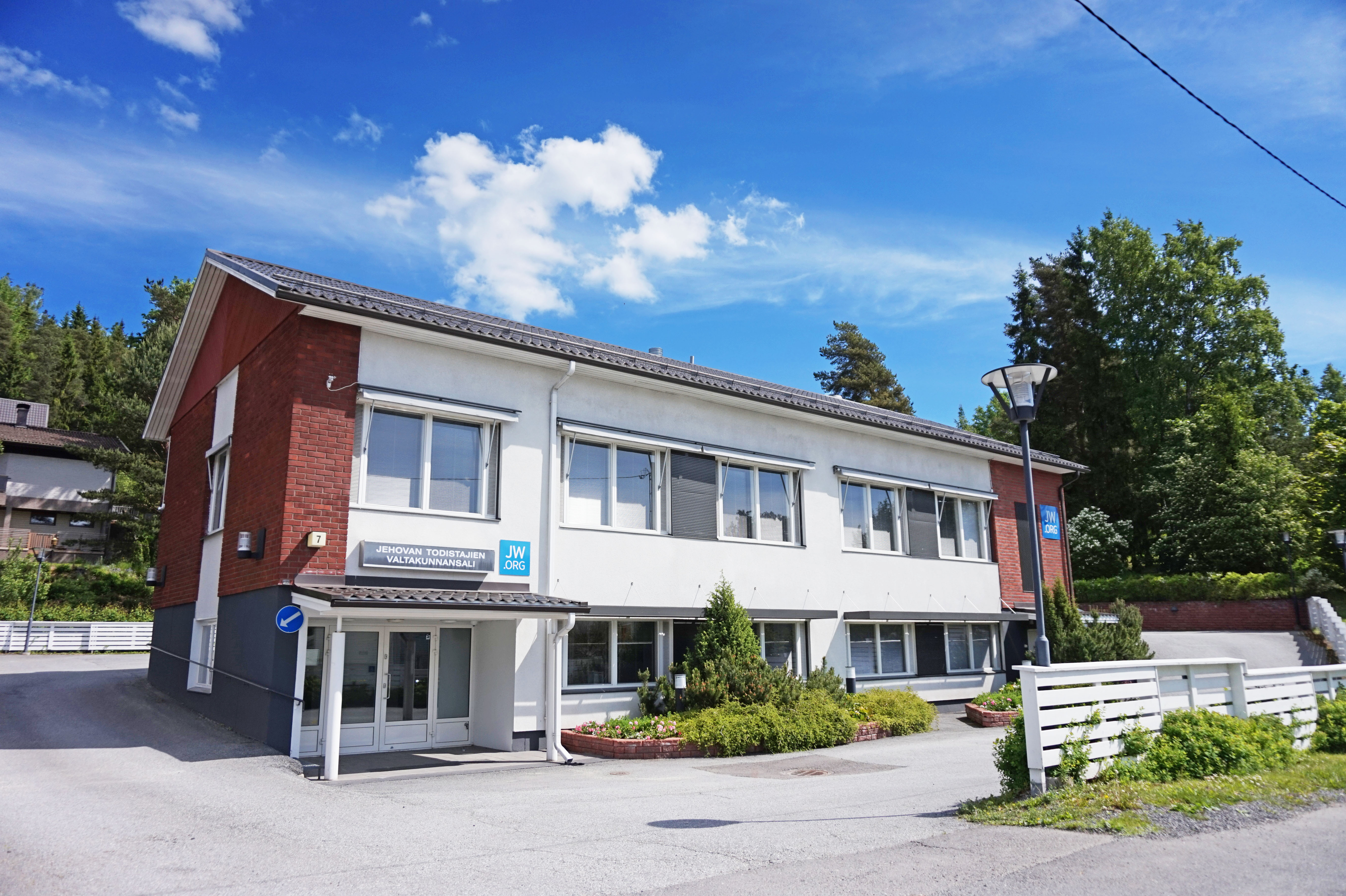
The Kingdom Hall of Jehovah's Witnesses in Epilänharju

Epilänharju is a district of Tampere, Finland. The district is bordered on the north by Lamminpää, on the east by Lielahti, on the south by Epilä and on the west by Tohloppi and Ristimäki. The Epilänharju district is home to the former Epilä Spa, which has now been abandoned and left to decay, as well as Abloy Oy's former factory.

During the industrial period, Epilän Konepaja Oy, Oy Epilän nahkatehdas Ab, Epilän sementtivalimo Oy, Oy Excelsior Ab, Ab Lukko Oy and Sahanterä Oy operate in the Epilänharju district. The former factory building of the leather factory was renovated into an apartment building in the early 2000s.

The name Epilänharju is based on Epilä's house and area. The Epilä House, which belonged to the village of Tohloppi, was already mentioned in the land register of 1540, and was located on the site of the later Winter's paint factory. The name Epilä is possibly based on the Swedish male given name Ebbe. Pirunharju has appeared as the local co-name of Epilänharju. Industry began to emerge in the area at the turn of the 20th century, when the Tampere–Pori railway was completed. Along with other western connection areas, Epilänharju was transferred from the municipality of the northern Pirkkala to the city of Tampere at the beginning of 1937. The first town plan of Epilänharju was approved in 1956.
