= Westeri =

- Liikekeskus Westeri
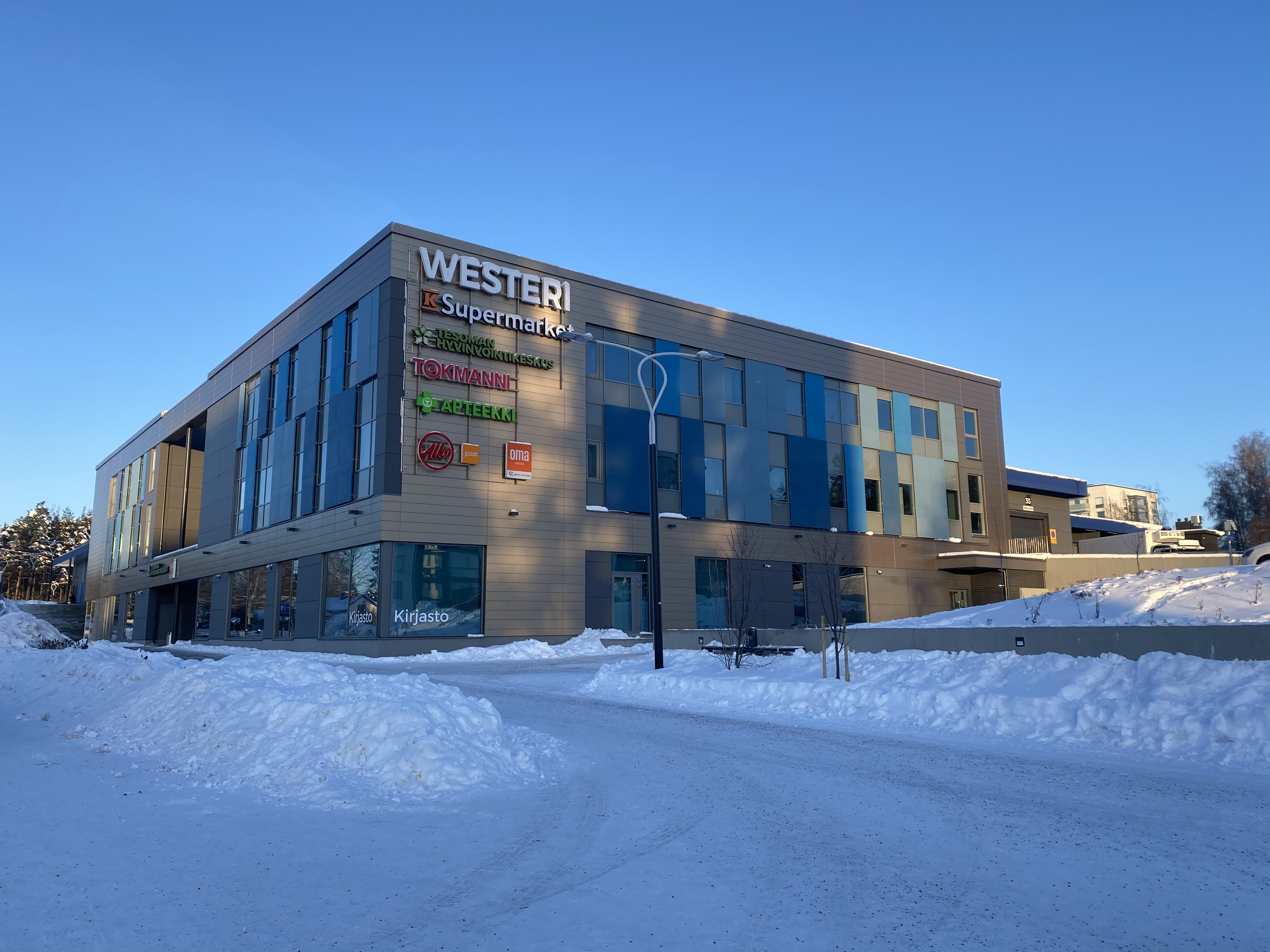
- Westeri in February 2021
- Location: Tesomajärvi, Tampere, Finland
- Coordinates: 61°30′18.05746″N 23°37′36.97187″E
- Address: Tesomankatu 4
- Opened: March 22, 2018 (first phase); April 12, 2019 (second phase)
- Num. of stores: 12
- Num. of anchor tenants: 1
- Floor area: 12,000 m^{2}
- Floors: 3
- Parking: 130 (in parking hall)
- Website: liikekeskuswesteri.fi

Westeri is a shopping center completed in the spring of 2018 in the Tesomajärvi district of Tampere, Finland. The anchor tenant is the grocery store K-Supermarket, in connection with which Posti and Matkahuolto points serve. Other stores in the shopping center include Alko, Kotipizza, Linkosuo Café, Pizza Hut, Subway, Tesoma Pharmacy, Instrumentarium, Tokmanni, 24 Pesula laundry and sushi restaurant Asahi Sushi. Westeri's premises also house the Tampere City Welfare Center, which includes the Tesoma Library, the Tesoma Youth Center, a dental clinic, health center, and Fimlab laboratory.
