= Myllypuro, Tampere =

City district in Tampere, Finland

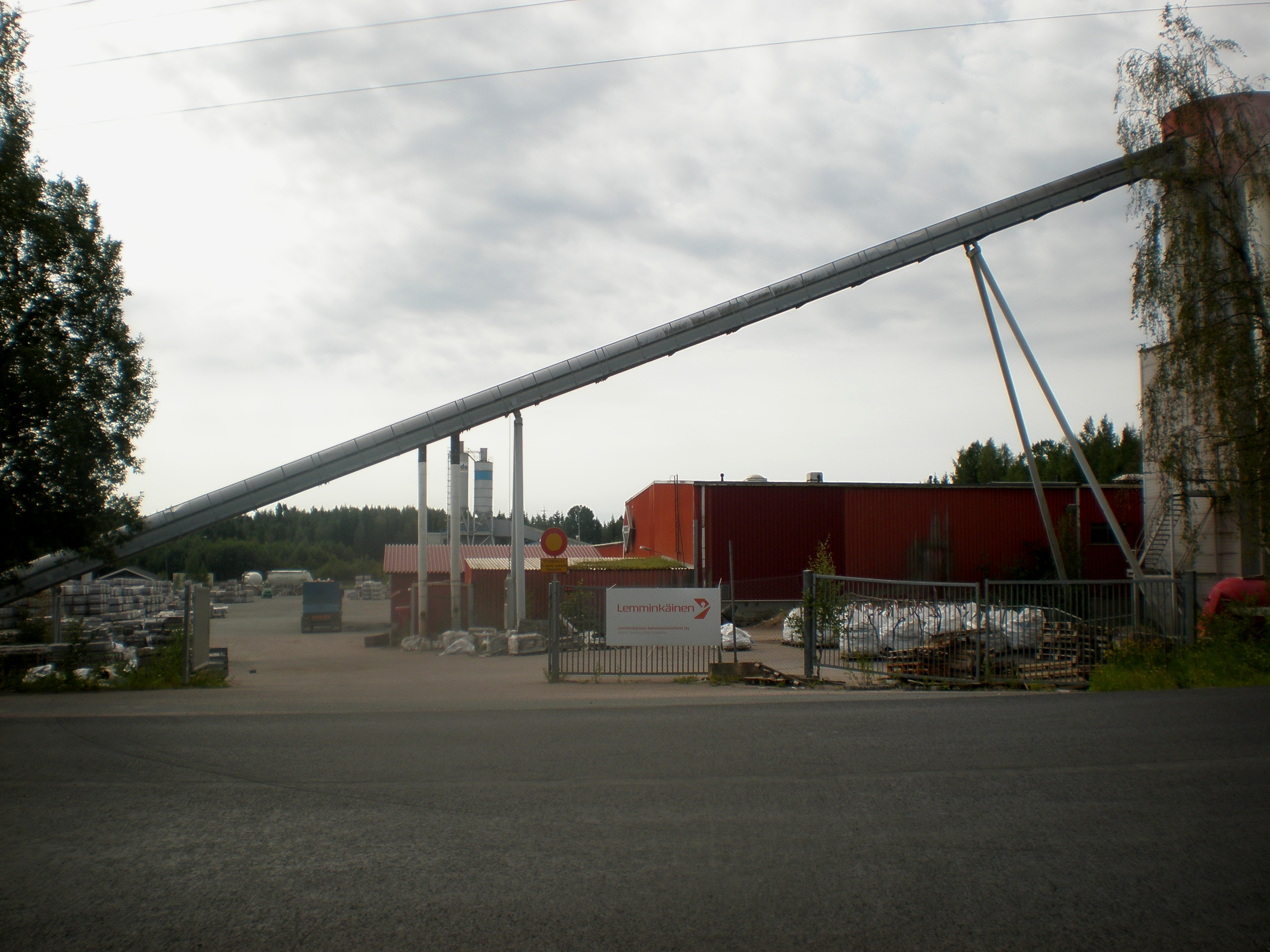
Rudus and Lemminkäinen factories in Myllypuro

Myllypuro is a neighbourhood in the city of Tampere, Finland near border of the Nokia municipality. It got its name from the Myllypuro flowing between the district and Ikuri, whose old name is Tuohijoki or also Myllyoja.
