= Rahola =

City district in Tampere, Finland

Coordinates: 61°29′51.9″N 23°38′20″E

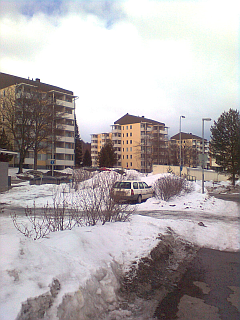
Winter 2011 in Rahola.

Rahola is a district in Tampere, Finland. The area is located on northern shore of Pyhäjärvi lake, south of the Tampere–Pori railway.

The area has been inhabited since medieval times. The climate on area sloping south to lakeside is favourable for agriculture, and there have been several manor houses. The area has been also an important transport hub, as the roads to Ylöjärvi and Nokia meet there. Railway to Pori was built 1895, and the motorway in 1964. The area become part of Tampere in 1937.

After the Second World War, allotment gardens were opened to former pastures of Rahola manor for inhabitants to grow vegetables. The use of these allotments soon developed to more recreational use, and flowers, strawberries and tomatoes replaced the root vegetables.

Rahola school covers classes from 0 to 9, and it has in total 690 pupils. Rahola had its own shop from 1962 to 2017. During the busiest years, there were four shops, three banks, post office and pharmacy.
